= History of Sherry =

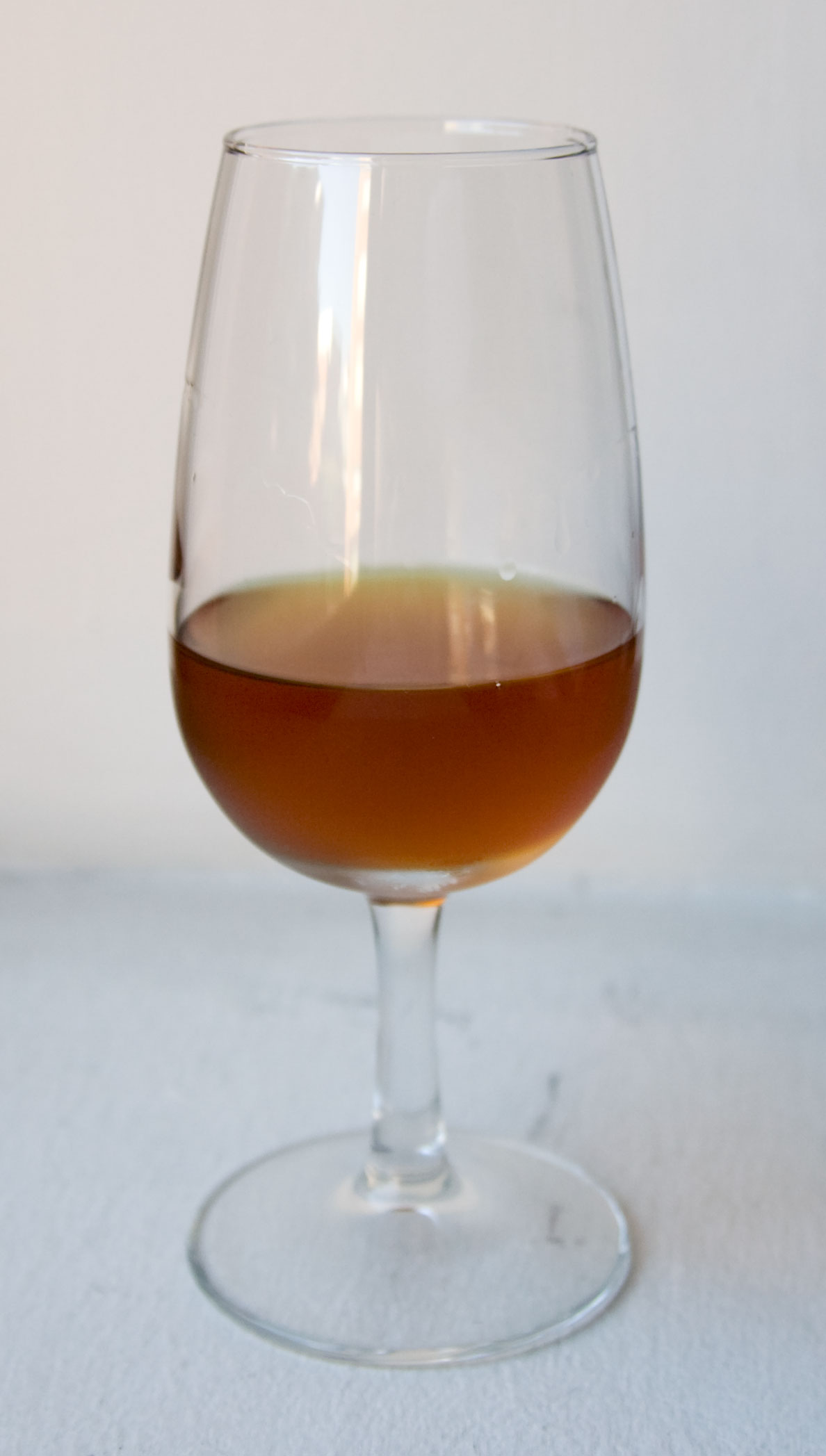
A glass of Amontillado sherry.

The history of Sherry is closely linked with that of Spanish wine production, particularly the political fortunes of the Cádiz region, where it originated with the early Phoenician settlement of the Iberian Peninsula. The triangular region between the towns of Jerez de la Frontera, El Puerto de Santa María, and Sanlúcar de Barrameda still marks the limits of the modern denominación. One of the world's oldest wines, its considerable evolution has been marked by the influence of many of the world's greatest empires and civilizations: the Phoenicians, Greeks, Romans, Moors, Spanish and British. Today, while Sherry does not enjoy the level of popularity it once did, it remains one of the wine world's most unusual and historical expressions.

== Early history and Roman times ==
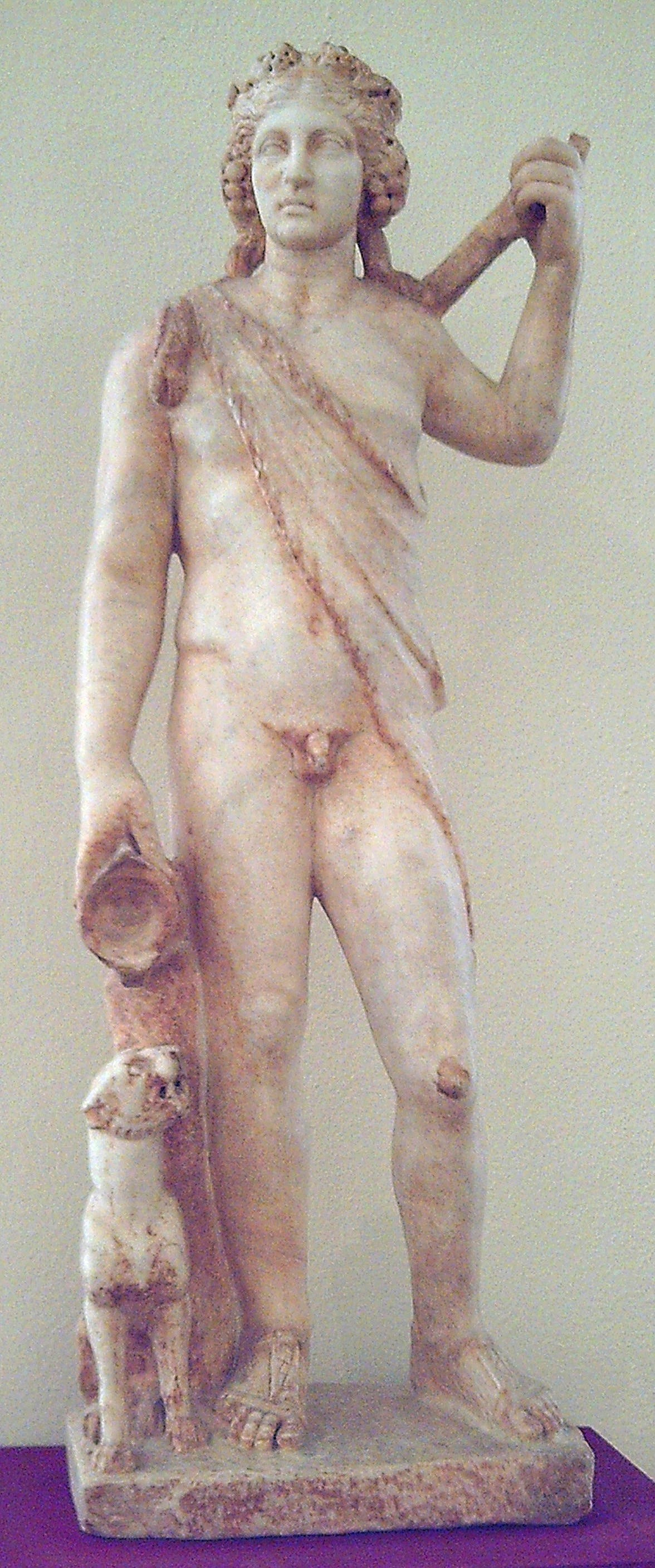
The grape-crowned Bacchus of Aldaia, a 1st- or 2nd-century statue from Roman Spain

The city of Cádiz was first founded sometime between 1104 BC and the 9th century BC as a trading post by the Canaanite tribe of the Phoenicians. The Phoenicians shared in the winemaking traditions of the Ancient Middle East and likely brought grapevines with them as they established their settlement. The Greeks soon followed and brought with them the tradition of making arrope, a dark colored sweet syrup made from unfermented grape juice that could be used to sweeten wine.

The area was thoroughly entrenched in winemaking by the time the Romans conquered the area in 206 BC after more than three centuries of rule by Carthage. Under the Carthaginians, the work of the early viticulturist Mago was widely followed in the area. The early Roman agriculturalist Columella was a native of Cádiz and was similarly influenced by the area's winemaking tradition. Soon wine from the region was being spread throughout the Roman Empire where it came to be known as Ceretanum or "wine from Ceret" which was an early name for the Sherry namesake of Jerez. The Roman poet Martial was one of the earliest writers to describe this primitive Sherry, which he said was highly regarded in Roman circles. During the Roman times, the practice of boiling grape must in order to concentrate the sugar as another means of sweetening the wine was starting to become widely used in the area.

== Moors ==
Following the decline of the Roman Empire, the area came under the rule of the Moors from North Africa who were in power until their expulsion during the Reconquista-from Jerez in 1231 and Cádiz in 1262 AD. Under the Islamic rule of the Moors, the consumption of alcohol was forbidden but some winemaking continued to exist in the region as part of trade and commerce with the non-Muslim neighbors. The Moors also introduced the process of distillation known as alembic to the region which created a crude form of grape liqueur and would be a precursor to the technique of adding brandy to Sherry. Under Moorish rule the Roman town of "Ceret" was renamed to Sherish which later evolved to Jerez de la Frontera as it became the frontier town between Christian Spain and the Moorish kingdom in the 13th century.

== Age of Exploration ==
During the "Age of Exploration" the ports of Sanlúcar de Barrameda and Cádiz were the starting points for many of the voyages to the New World and the East Indies, including some of the voyages of Christopher Columbus and Ferdinand Magellan. On many of these voyages, stocking up on ample supplies of the area's wine was considered a necessity. Christopher Columbus almost certainly had Sherry with him when he made some of his voyages to America which makes Sherry, in all likelihood, the first wine brought to the New World. For Magellan's voyage 594,790 maravedis were spent on wine compared to 566,684 maravedis on all the ships's armaments and men's weapons.

At the turn of the 15th century, several factors came into play that had a major impact on the global wine market. The Venetian traders were losing their supply of sweet wine from the lands of Cyprus, Greece, Romania and Hungary to the emerging dominance of the Ottoman Empire. War with France had lost the English their access to the wines of Bordeaux. Seeing an opportunity to capitalize on this, the Spanish Duke of Medina Sidonia made several moves to put Sherry into the forefront of the world's wine market. In 1491, the export tax on wine was abolished for both Spanish and foreign vessels coming into Sanlúcar. In 1517, English merchants were given preferential merchant status-including the right to bear arms in the region.

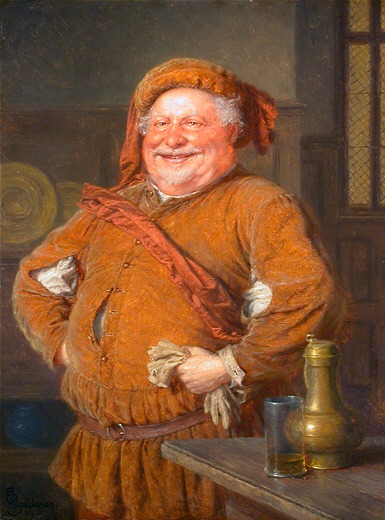
Shakespeare's Falstaff and his affection for Sherry "sack" did much to spread the reputation of the drink.

For a period of time, English sales of Sherry (or "Sherris sack" or just "sack", as it was sometimes known) were large and they continued to grow till the foreign relations between England and Spain declined with Henry VIII's divorce from the Spanish princess Catherine of Aragon. In addition to triggering the English Reformation and the break from the Roman Catholic Church, it also brought every English merchant in Spain under the watch of the Spanish Inquisition. Many merchants closed up shop and fled while others were jailed for failing to repent or denounce their King. Some merchant ships forwent the sale and transport of wine to become privateers.

In the 1580s, King Philip II of Spain ordered an invasion of England and set about building what would become the Spanish Armada at the naval shipyards of Cádiz. In 1587, Sir Francis Drake captured the harbor and set fire to many of the ships, delaying the launch of the Armada by a year. He also captured 2,900 butts of Sherry that was at the docks waiting to be loaded for ships to South America. The wine that Drake brought back to England only increased the English esteem and thirst for Sherry. William Shakespeare characterized the English's love for "sack" with his character of Sir John Falstaff who most famously noted in Henry IV, Part 2 that "If I had a thousand sons, the first humane principle I would teach them should be, to forswear thin potations and to addict themselves to sack."

== Development of modern Sherry ==
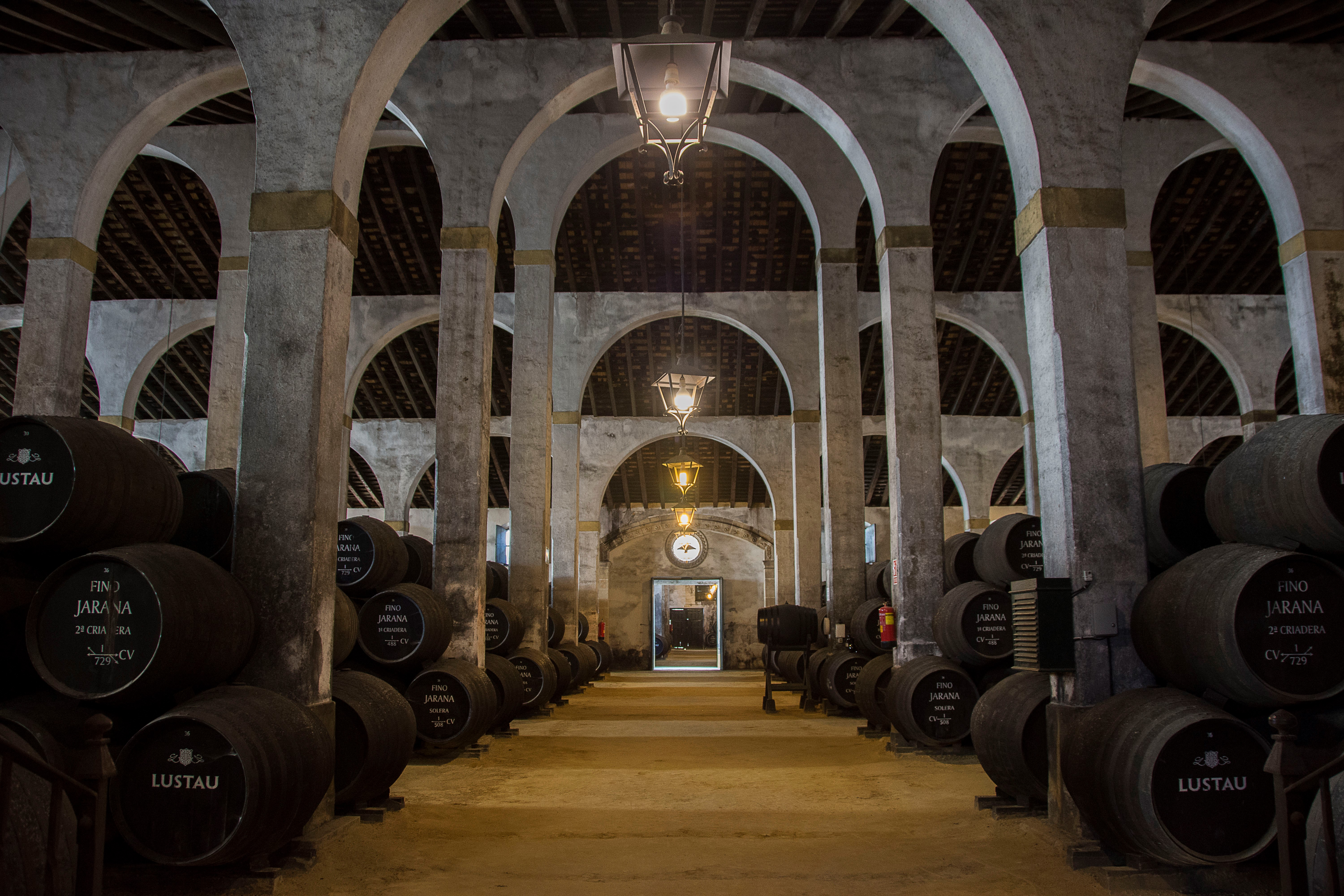
A solera system storing Sherry.

However the Sherry in Falstaff's day was not as strong as it is today because it had not yet become a fortified wine. The natural strength of the wine rarely topped 16% ABV and the wines were closer in character to the modern day wine still being made in Montilla. At this point, the makers of Sherry were still experimenting with the various grapes available including Torrontes, Malmsey and some minor but growing plantings of the modern day Sherry grapes of Palomino, Pedro Ximénez, and Muscatel. Towards the turn of the 17th century, Sherry makers were starting to discover that the white chalk albariza soil of the area produced some of the freshest wine and there was some understanding of the strange but powerful effect of the yeast flor. They began calling these wines Fino or "fine wine" because of the delicate light style that was produced.

The War of the Spanish Succession and later Napoleonic Wars allowed politics to once again influence the fortune of Sherry and its producers. Sales to England and the Netherlands were dramatically reduced as hostilities increased. European tastes also started to change as the emergence of the more accessible port wine hit the British wine market - being particularly encouraged by the favorable Methuen Treaty. This left many Sherry merchants with excess stock that could do little more than sit and age in oak barrels. Unlike during the boom market when Sherry makers were selling their stocks as fast as they could produce it, these aging stocks began to slightly oxidize and develop more concentrated and nutty flavors.

As a few orders of Sherry would trickle in, the Sherry merchants would bottle a small quantity and then top up the rest of the barrel with wine from some of their newer inventory. This began to develop into a system of "fractional blending" which was soon to become the modern concept of solera. This system was not unique to Sherry or even to Spain: it had been practiced for centuries in the Rhineland. However nowhere else in the world had such a system had such a dramatic effect on the wine. Through this process of aging, the wine developed distinct characters at various age points. The introduction of new wine into the barrel also stimulated the flor yeast in the wine which then imparted new flavors and fragrances. Through the use of fractional blending, the merchants realized they could also maintain a more consistent profile in their wines across the years.

=== Fortification ===
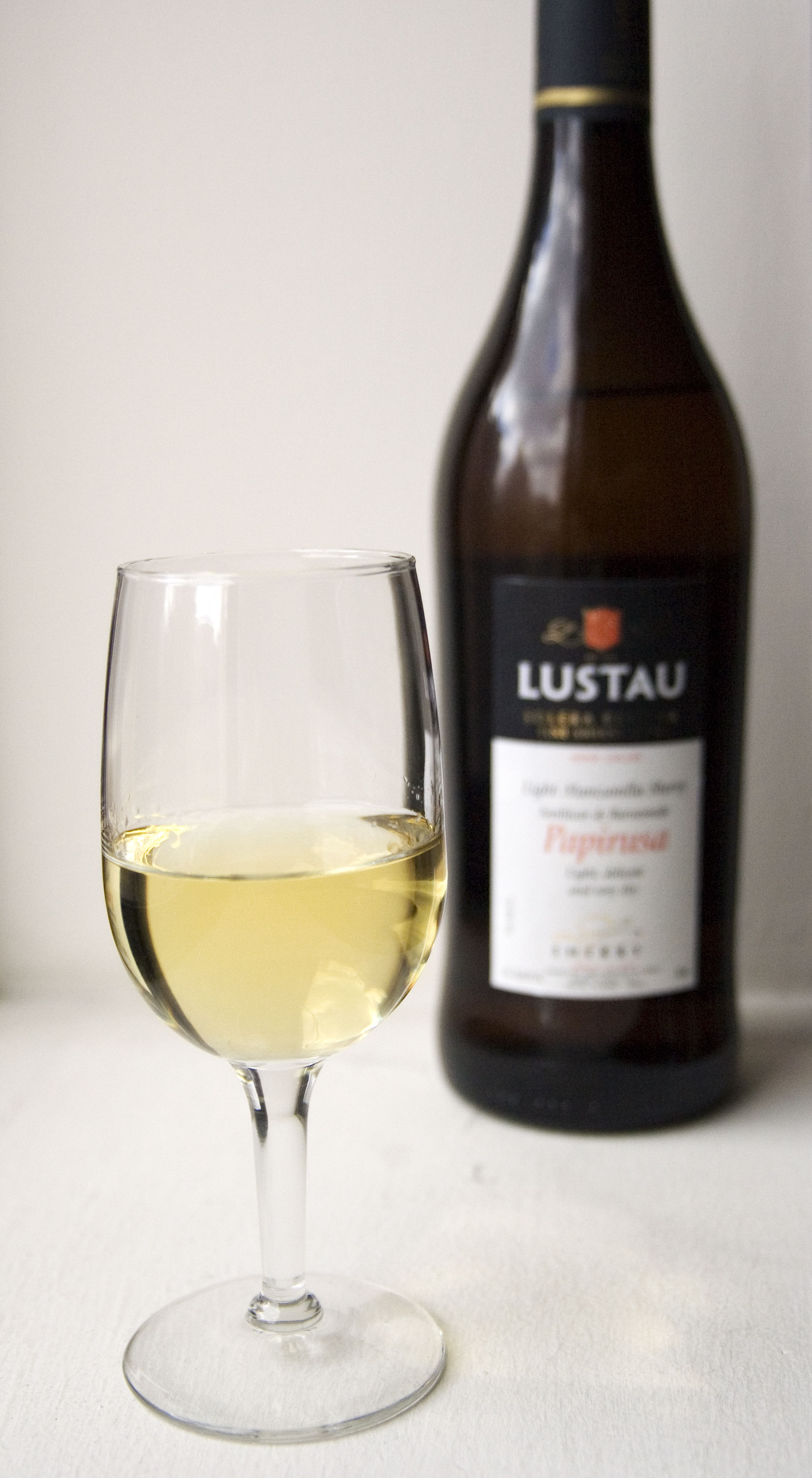
Manzanilla

The taste of most of the wine world was still geared towards sweet and strong wines, and the Portuguese were seeing great success in adding brandy to make their port wines stronger. The Jerezanos began to experiment with adding brandy to Sherry and discovered that the increased alcohol content also had the effect of killing off the flor, which then made the wine oxidize more and develop into another style of wine. The merchants began to call this wine oloroso meaning "pungent". The Sherry makers in Sanlúcar were a little more restrained in the use of their brandy, finding that the unique aspect of flor took on new distinction amid the salty sea breezes that cooled most of the area's bodegas. The finos produced here were even lighter and more delicate with a freshness reminiscent of apples. They began to call these wines manzanilla or "little apple".

The bodegas also found that if they limited the number of times that fresh wine was added to the solera they could develop a wine style between fino and oloroso that would have some of the fragrant qualities that flor added, but with a little more oxidation and concentration of flavors. This style was reminiscent of the wines from nearby Montilla and they picked up the name amontillado meaning "in the style of Montilla". There was more experimentation in making the wines sweeter. They found that the must from Pedro Ximénez (PX) grape oxidized more slowly and added its own dimension of strength and sweetness to wine that it was blended with. Wines with significant proportions of PX added started to be called "Cream" or "Sweet" Sherry.

=== Modern day ===
Throughout the course of the 19th century, Sherry competed with Rioja for the distinction of being Spain's most recognizable wine and would be considered by many wine critics as one of the great expressions of white wine in the world. Sherry also had to compete with the new wave of "Sherry-like" wines being produced in South Africa, the United States, Australia, France and Germany. Then came the almost inevitable attack of the phylloxera plague. At the turn of the 20th century, Sherry merchants worked to replant their devastated vineyards and reclaim lost ground in the wine market. The region attained Denominación de Origen status in 1935 and began work to trademark the name Sherry for the unique wines produced in the region (which it now is within the European Union). Despite these efforts, sales continued to decline at the end of the 20th century as Sherry fell out of fashion among consumers-especially in some of the emerging markets of the United States, Japan and Australia.

== See also ==
- Hidalgo (sherry)
- History of Port
