= Juan José Palomino Jiménez =

Spanish entrepreneur and politician

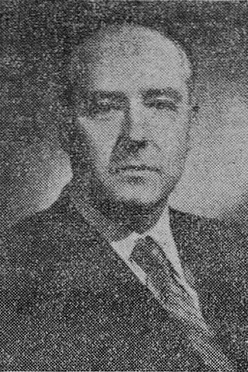
- Born: 1895; El Puerto de Santa Maria, Spain
- Died: 1977 (aged 81–82); Jerez de la Frontera, Spain
- Occupation: entrepreneur
- Known for: politician
- Political party: Carlism

Juan José Palomino Jiménez (1895-1977) was a Spanish entrepreneur and politician. In business he is known mostly as co-owner and manager of Palomino & Vergara, a sherry brand popular in Spain and beyond between the 1930s and the 1960s; he also contributed to development of the xérès winegrowing business. Politically he supported the Traditionalist cause. In 1932 he was involved in Sanjurjada, a coup intended to topple the Republican government. In 1933–1936 he served as a Carlist deputy to the Cortes, while in 1968–1971 he was president of Junta Suprema Tradicionalista, the top Carlist executive structure.

== Family and youth ==
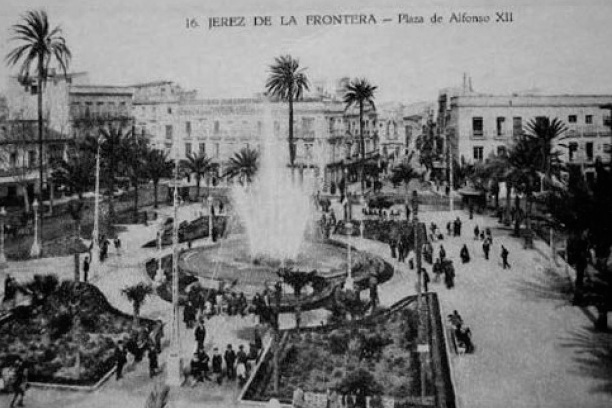
Jerez de la Frontera, early 20th c.

Most authors when referring distant Palomino past point to a half-mythical knight Fernán Yáñez Palomino, who originated either from Cantabria or Navarre. He made his name during Reconquista, distinguished himself in service of Alfonso X and settled in the area of Jerez de la Frontera in the 13th century. A frequently repeated account holds that the Palominos have been since then busy with "cultivo del viñedo y crianza de vinos" in the region, though documents confirm this starting the year of 1483. During the following four centuries the family got very branched and scattered throughout not only the province of Cádiz, but also across most of Western Andalusia.

None of the sources consulted provides information on what particular branch the ancestors of Juan José belonged to, apart that they have emerged as large landowners in Campiña de Jerez and continued to grow wine. Close to nothing is known about the paternal grandfather, Pedro Palomino, apart that probably in the early 19th century he married Margarita López and kept developing the family wine business. Their son and the father of Juan José, Francisco Palomino López, at unspecified time married María del Rosario Jiménez García (died after 1933); there is no closer information available either on her on her family. Accessible data on the couple is confusing and subject to doubt.

Nothing is known on childhood and education of Juan José. He was born in a coastal town of El Puerto de Santa María, but it is not clear whether he frequented schools there or in Jerez de la Frontera, where the family moved some time in the late 19th century. It is possible if not likely that he received schooling in the Marianist college, operational in Jerez; later on Palomino was very active in Los Luises, a congregation ran by the order. It is neither known whether and if yes where he pursued an academic career. A typical path for a young man from a well-off family would have been studying law, most likely in Seville, but there is no confirmation of Palomino graduating either in the early 1920s or at any other time.

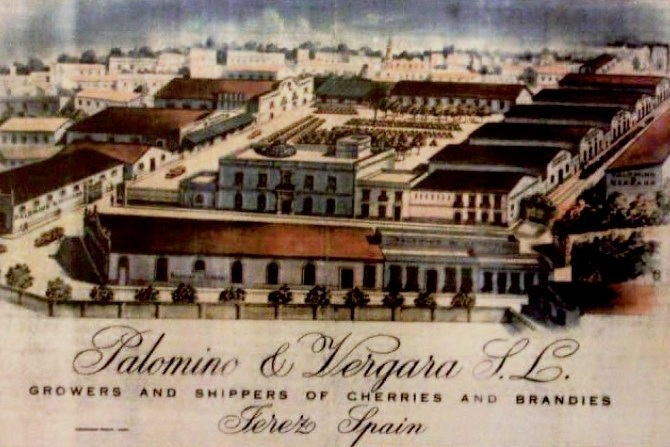
Palomino & Vergarra bodegas

At unspecified time but prior to 1927 Palomino married Isabel Vergara Sanchiz (1895-1977), a girl from Jerez and descendant to another wealthy winegrower family. It is possible that the marriage was part of a wider agreement, as at the time the two houses merged to create a joint Palomino & Vergara company. However, information related is confusing; some sources suggest that the Palominos and the Vergaras might have been running a joint business since the late or even early 19th century. The couple lived on family estate in Jerez de la Frontera and either owned or co-owned with other relatives the wine economy inherited. There is no information on their children and it appears that they were childless. None of Palomino's relatives became a public figure.

== Early public engagements (before 1932) ==
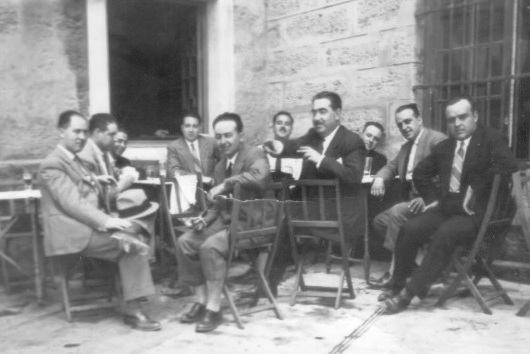
Palomino with friends, early 1930s

Little is known about political preferences of Palomino's ancestors; some information suggest they were related to Integrism. In the 1880s his father appeared in El Siglo Futuro as co-signatory of letters, protesting alleged mistreatment of the Catholics. The family of Palomino's in-laws, the Vergaras, were distantly related to the Nocedal family; the Nocedals, the Vergaras and the Palominos maintained family relations. However, there is no confirmed information of either the Palominos or the Vergaras as active in the movement. It is known that Juan José received a “sólida formación tradicionalista” and was very religious, when possible attending the mass every morning. In the late 1910s and the early 1920s he was very active in Congregación Marianista de San Luis Gonzaga, a Catholic charity and educational institution. In 1919 he was noted in labors to contain the Spanish Flu pandemic and in 1920 he grew to membership in provincial executive of the organisation.

There is nothing known of Palomino's public activity in the early and mid-1920s, the final years of liberal Restoration regime and most of the Primo de Rivera dictatorship. It is not known whether he joined the primoderiverista organizations, especially Unión Patriótica and Somatén. However, he was on at least correct terms with the local regime administration, as at unspecified time and in early 1928 latest he was nominated to the Jerez de la Frontera town hall, at the time its members not elected, but appointed by the provincial administration. As councilor he entered two committees: this of policia rural and this of instrucción pública, asuntos jurídicos y cárcel. His membership in ayuntamiento was confirmed in the last voting of the monarchy; the local elections of April 1931, which ultimately brought about the fall of the monarchy, secured Palomino's renewed term in the town hall.

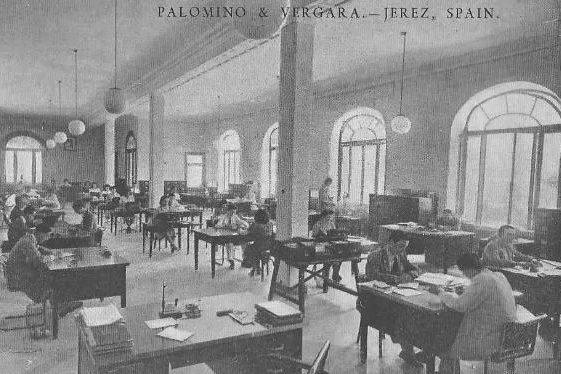
office premises of Palomino & Vergara, Jerez de la Frontera

Information on Palomino's political preferences of the very early 1930s is inconclusive. In October 1930 he was active in Partido Católico Nacional, an Integrist organisation created after the fall of Primo; Palomino entered the local Junta Directiva and became its secretary, apparently on excellent terms with the party leader in Western Andalusia, Manuel Fal Conde. However, in the local elections of 1931 he ran as "gremialista" against the republican-socialist coalition and the following year he was still counted within "minoría gremial". During the first Republican electoral campaign of June 1931 he co-financed the Jerez branch of Acción Nacional, a broad conservative alliance “dominated by an energetic group of middle-class Integrists”. In the summer he co-signed a manifesto, which declared setting up of a “partido político católico” within the general “tradicionalismo-integrista” current. In August he co-founded a local Jerez right-wing alliance Unión de Derechas Independientes and entered its ruling junta; in early 1932 as member of Juventud of Derechas Independientes he invited José Antonio Primo de Rivera to Jerez and entertained him during a banquet. Also in early 1932 he took part in a joint rightist conference in Jerez, attended by one of the Carlist national leaders Conde de Rodezno.

== Sanjurjada and its aftermath (1932–1933) ==
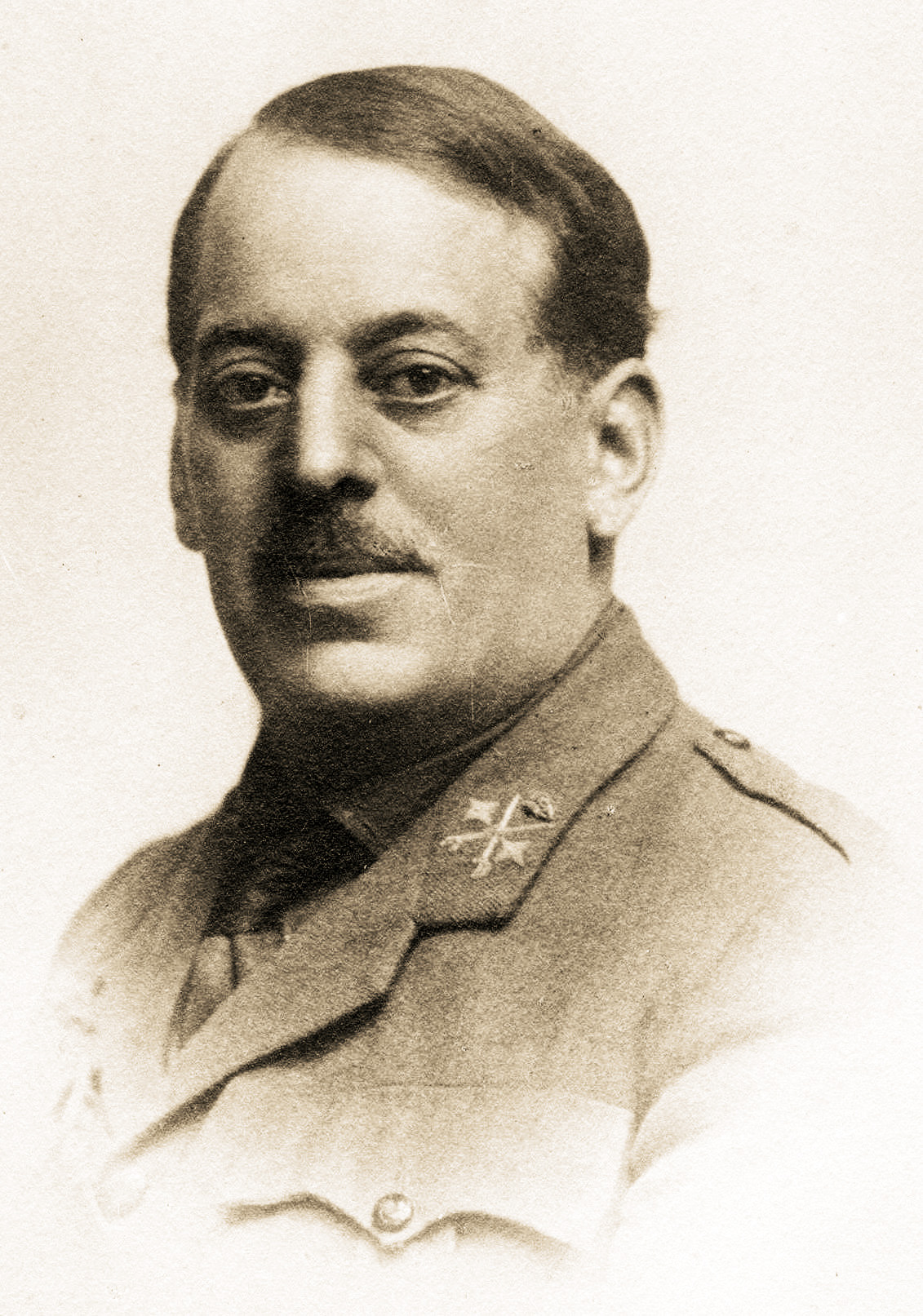
Sanjurjo

In the summer of 1932 some high army officers, perturbed by a series of Republican reforms targeting the military and outraged by contemptuous stand of Manuel Azaña, decided to stage a coup and topple the Madrid government. In Andalusia the plot was headed by general Sanjurjo. It appears that in Jerez de la Frontera local conservative activists were involved in the conspiracy. At 8 PM on August 9, few hours prior to the agreed start of the rebellion, local Unión de Derechas Independientes leaders gathered during a one-hour meeting; Palomino was among them. The agenda remains unclear, but a historian suspects they were discussing logistics of the coup in Jerez. During the night the civilians involved who owned cars, including Palomino, used their machines to transport Guardia Civil members from county village posts to Jerez. In the early morning hours of August 10 the same cars were used in a co-ordinated action of detaining local syndicalist and left-wing activists.

Once the local commanding officer Arturo Roldán Trápaga assumed power in Jerez, Palomino and other UDI leaders offered their services. Roldan declared no further aid was needed, and called for a formal town hall meeting; he asked the concejales present to remain calm and go home. The alcalde contacted the Cádiz civil governor, who remained loyal to the government and demanded compliance. Alcalde then challenged Roldan, who – apparently bewildered - withdrew to the barracks. Early afternoon the mayor invited Palomino and councilors implicated for a meeting, locked them down and put under guard. In the evening they were transported to prison in Cádiz. In few hours also the rebellious Seville garrison surrendered; Jerez and Seville were the only cities where for brief time the insurgents took control.

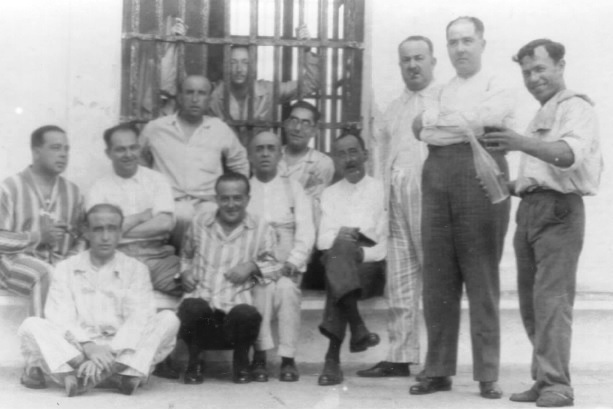
Palomino and other deportees during their stay in Villa de Cisneros

In September Palomino and 161 inmates involved in the coup, soon to become known as Sanjurjada, were transported from Cádiz to Villa de Cisneros, a Spanish military outpost in Africa. Though technically under arrest, they were treated rather leniently; not restrained to their cells, they enjoyed fishing or taking long walks. Palomino emerged among informal leaders of the group, gaining respect due to “serenidad de su juicio y la inflexibilidad de sus ideas”. He reportedly set up and led a local Carlist circle. It is the first confirmed information about his activity within Carlism, though numerous historians claim that already when deported, he had been zealously engaged in the movement and even led the Cádiz Junta Regional. Following “una conducta correctísima” in February 1933 Palomino returned to Jerez, hailed by the local Traditionalists. At this time part of his landholdings were already declared expropriated and subject to Agrarian Reform. Formal legal proceedings against the plotters were concluded in February 1934 with the nolle prosequi verdict and their Cisneros detention counted in as part of the penalty. Palomino, who was suspended as the Jerez concejal, already in August 1933 got reinstated to this duties in the town hall.

== Carlist: deputy and conspirator (1933–1937) ==
Carlist standard

Back from Villa Cisneros Palomino threw himself into Carlist activity and toured the region in support of the cause. It is not clear whether he entered regional Comuníon Tradicionalista executive; his popularity in the party nationwide remained limited. Prior to the 1933 general elections and as representative of local CT he negotiated buildup of the Cádiz alliance, in sources referred either as Unión Ciudadana y Agraria or Acción Ciudadana of Cadiz; its electoral motto was “Por la Religión, por la Patria, por el Orden, por la Familia, por la Industria, por el Comercio, por la Verdad y en contra de los Enchufismos y de las muchas Casas Viejas”. Palomino stood in Jerez and was comfortably elected; in Cortes he joined the Carlist minority. His term lasted over 2 years, but was not marked by impressive activity. Instead of politics, he was rather recorded for interventions related to support for Jerez or for the winegrowing business.

Either in 1933 or in 1934 Palomino purchased Diario de Jerez, since then referred as part "de la trust carlista de Fal Conde"; he also kept supporting the unofficial Carlist national mouthpiece El Siglo Futuro by systematically publishing adverts of his wine business. In 1934 he entered the ruling board of the party-controlled publishing house Oficina de Prensa Tradicionalista and in 1935 was nominated to Junta de Hacienda, a body entrusted with management of the party financials. In 1935-1936 he was among relatively few Carlists engaged in Bloque National, an alliance with the Alfonsinos. During the 1936 electoral campaign as the CT representative he co-engineered a local Acción Ciudadana alliance, which eventually materialized as Candidatura Antirrevolucionaria; during the violent campaign Diario de Jerez premises were burnt by left-wing mob and the daily ceased to issue. The campaign itself was ultimately a failure; Palomino lost to Frente Popular competitors and failed to get his Cortes ticket renewed.

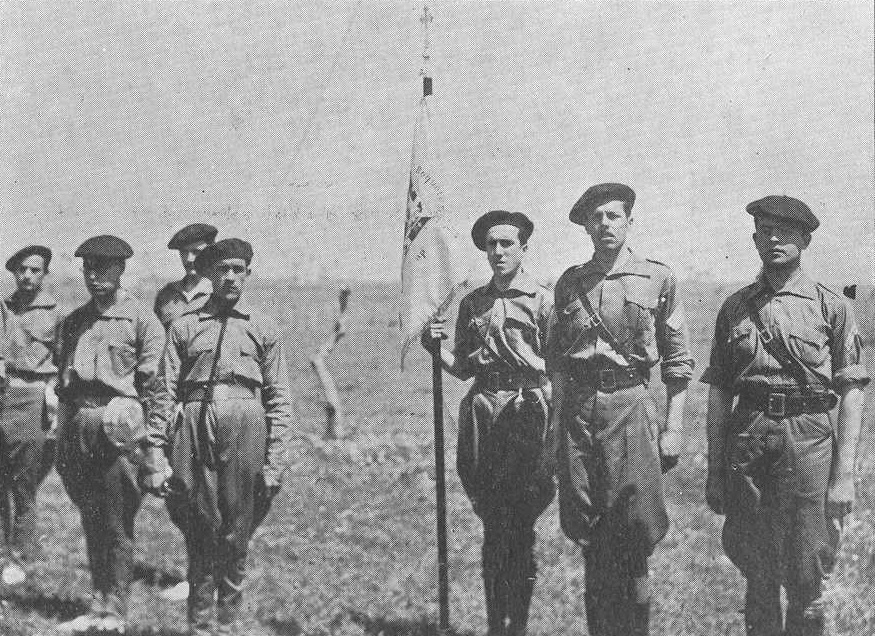
Pre-war drill of Andalusian requeté

Palomino was intrinsically involved in Carlist anti-Republican conspiracy of 1936; details are unclear. Jerez was easily seized by the rebels and Andalusian Carlism enjoyed its days of triumph, but in late 1936 Palomino was scarcely noted for his party activity, recorded rather during religious services to the fallen requeté. Though he did not form part of the nationwide Carlist executive Juna Nacional Carlista, he counted among members of the broad party command layer. He was present during the crucial Carlist meeting in Insua of February 1937, when regent-claimant and the movement leaders discussed the threat of forced amalgamation into a unificated state party. It is not clear whether Palomino sided with the tractable Rodeznistas or with the intransigent Falcondistas, even though for years he remained a close acquaintance of Fal Conde. However, following the Unification Decree Palomino was not listed as member of the FET structures; quite to the opposite, following 1937 he entirely disappeared from politics. If present in the press, it was because of the winegrowing business he kept advertising; indeed, it seems that during the following decades Palomino dedicated his time to commercial activities.

== Palomino and Vergara ==
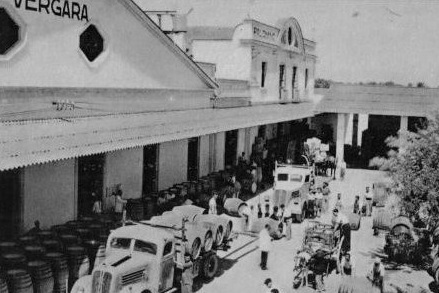
P&V bodega, Jerez

As the marriage of Juan José Palomino and Isabel Vergara was parallel to merger of Palomino and Vergara winegrowing businesses, he was possibly expected to take over the joint enterprise. Since the mid-1920s the press referred to the "Palomino y Vergara bodega" or to "señores Palomino y Vergara" as owners and managers, but it is not clear whether the Palomino in question was Juan José or his father. The first identified appearance of the Palomino & Vergara brand is dated on 1931. None of the sources consulted clarifies when Juan José Palomino became the key decision-maker in the enterprise; his father-in-law was active until 1935 and this is also the last time when the press referred to "señores Palomino y Vergara". In the late 1930s the company was entirely aligned with Palomino's Carlist political preferences; its beverages were named “Margaritas”, “Tradicionalista”, “Requeté” and “Carlista”; some of these products were marketed until the early 1940s.

In the mid-1940s Palomino attempted a dynamic expansion on the Spanish market. As he lacked funds, he intended to transform the company from family business to a joint-stock public limited company, the first of this kind among the Jerez wine enterprises. In 1947 he set up a Madrid-based Palomino SA, which controlled Palomino & Vergara. He was also opening branches across the country, with regional offices in Madrid, Barcelona, Valencia, Bilbao, Oviedo, Palma, Santander, Logroño, Burgos and Zaragoza. At that time P&V offered a wide range of products, principally brandy (Tres Racimos, Vencedor, Centurion, Eminencia) and various types of sherry: cortado (Bulería), fino (Tío Mateo), oloroso (Los Flamencos) and amontillado (John Peter). The company produced also anisette (La Jerezana) ponche (Carlista) and gin (Palomino). Its large Jerez bodega complex, known as “12 disciples”, was plugged into the railway network by means of own dedicated siding.

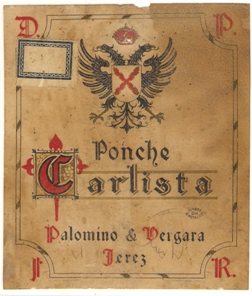
P&V ponche "Carlista"

The history of Palomino & Vergara in the 1950s is somewhat unclear. The company was very active commercially, e.g. presenting its products during glitzy fashion shows in Madrid or at commercial trade fairs abroad. On the other hand, it seems that Palomino was gradually losing control over the business, as constant need of capital and investments led to increasingly dispersed ownership of the company. In 1963 P&V – the brand served to kings, presidents and prime ministers - was taken over by a multi-business conglomerate Rumasa. It is not clear whether Palomino retained any influence in the executive structures or whether he retired entirely. The product portfolio was reduced; though heavily marketed, the key products - the brandy Fabuloso and the fino Tío Mateo – were positioned somewhere below their market competitors. In the early 1980s Rumasa was expropriated by the government due to heavy financial irregularities, and its assets were sold out. P&V was bought by a British investor who went on with Tio Mateo. Later the brand was purchased by a Spanish company and is currently owned by Bodegas Dios Baco; however, it disappeared commercially and there are no products branded Palomino & Vergara on the market.

== Carlist: inactivity and resurgence (1937–1967) ==
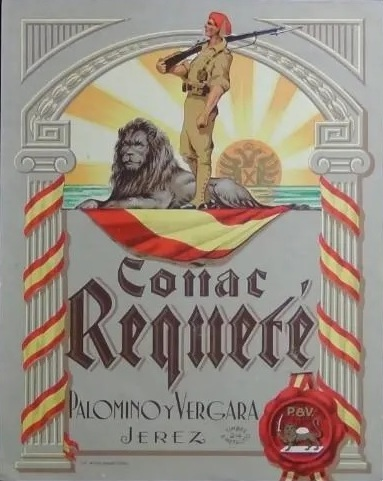
P&V brandy "Requete"

There is scarcely any information on Palomino's political engagements between the late 1930s and the late 1950s. None of historiographic works dealing with Carlism of the so-called primer franquismo mentions his name; the only episodes identified refer to religious activities and are vaguely flavored with Traditionalism, like his 1940 co-founding of a Catholic publishing house or a 1946 pilgrimage to Rome. However, Palomino at least maintained correspondence with party heavyweights. When in 1956-1958 the official Carlism turned a corner and changed its non-collaboration stand versus Francoism to cautious rapprochement, Palomino was on good terms with leaders of both currents, the departing leader Manual Fal and the new one José María Valiente. It is known that at the moment of takeover in 1957 Palomino was a “jefe regional de Sevilla”, which probably stands for leadership in Western Andalusia; Valiente intended to nominate him the head for entire Andalusia, which generated some dissent in the local Granada jeafatura. The idea was probably abandoned, as in 1962 Palomino was still noted as the CT leader in Andalusia Occidental.

Palomino was noted mostly for ceremonial roles in the party, e.g. in the late 1950s he entertained the Carlist infante Don Carlos Hugo or in the early 1960s he played host to infanta María de las Nieves during their tours to Seville and around. It started to change with mid-decade approaching; in 1963 he co-signed “El Carlismo y la unidad católica”, an official party document which voiced against the perspective of introducing religious liberty in Spain. One year earlier he was nominated to a 6-member Comisión Especial de Estudios Económicos, a party body entrusted with sanating the ailing CT budget, always in dramatic shortage of cash. The appointment was related to his image of a successful businessman, “hombre de impresa” active in various chambers of commerce and capable of pulling many strings. However, it seems that at this role he did not meet expectations; in 1964 Palomino was noted struggling to sort things out. In 1965 he was eventually appointed the carlist jefe in all of Andalusia; his public activity was about opening new party círculos or presiding over grand requeté ex-combatant rallies.

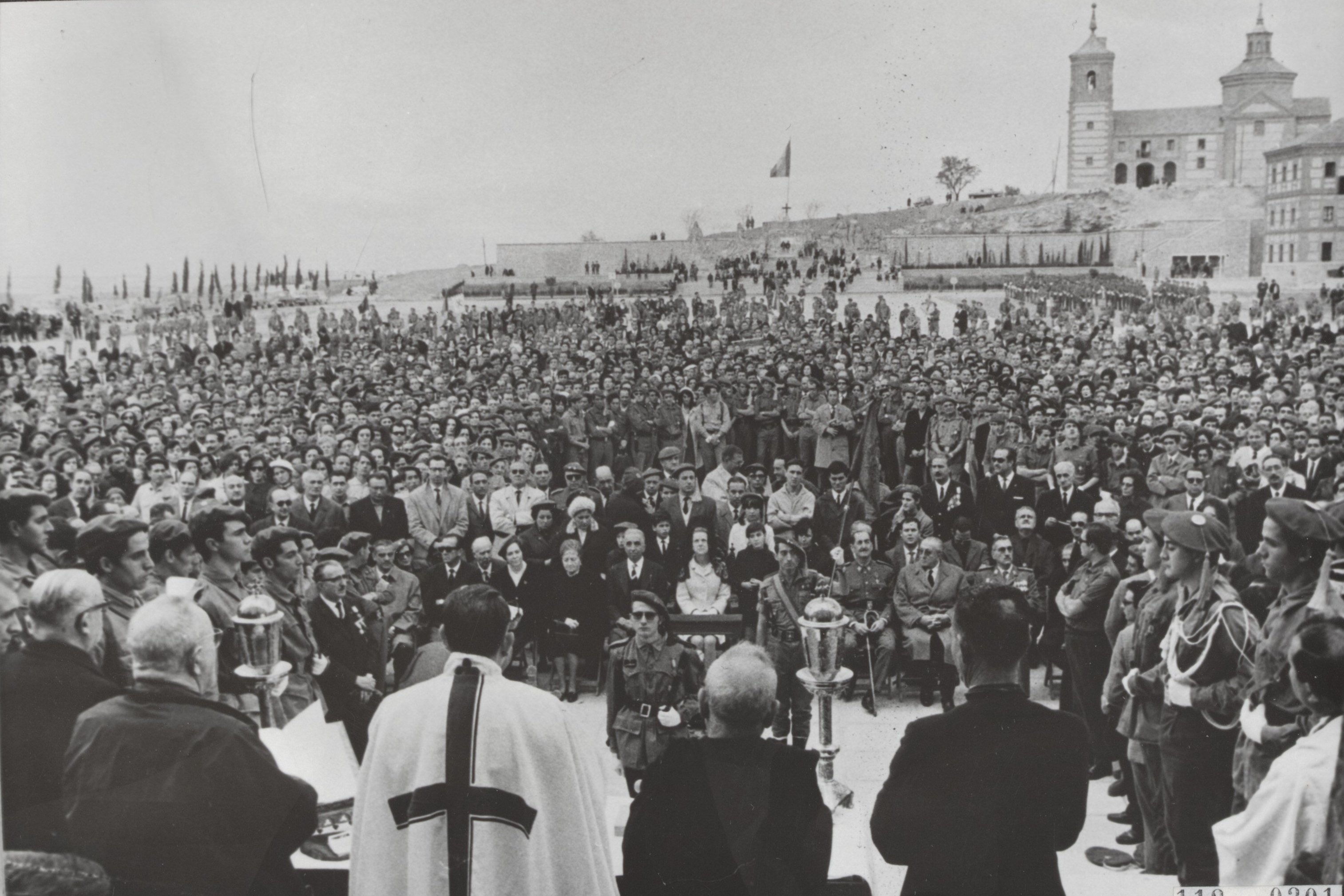
Carlist rally near Madrid, mid-1960s

Until the mid-1960s Palomino was not noted for any role in decision-making process within the party. At the time it was increasingly divided between the Traditionalists and the new breed of militants grouped around Don Carlos Hugo, who pursued an increasingly heterodox agenda. It is not clear whether Palomino engaged in rivalry between the two factions, though his unswerving loyalty to the dynasty, shared with his close friend Fal, rendered him a potential ally of the Huguistas. When in 1965 they enforced major shakeup in party executive strucutes, by some dubbed “internal coup within Carlism”, Palomino found himself promoted; he entered Junta de Gobierno, a new collegial body auxiliary to the party jefe Valiente. In 1966 CT introduced a new command layer, “delgaciones regias”, with Spain divided into 5 zones; Palomino was nominated head of “South of Spain”.

== Carlist: elevation to leadership (1967–1968) ==
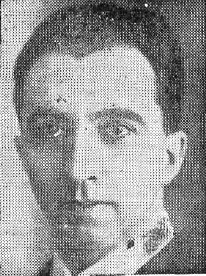
Valiente (earlier photo)

In 1967 the Huguistas were almost fully in control of the party; the last obstacle to total domination was the movement leader Valiente, eventually manoeuvred into dismissal later this year. The vacated post of Jefe Delegado was not filled and Junta de Gobierno was dissolved; a new collegial executive Junta Suprema Tradicionalista was set up, and the king-claimant Don Javier nominated Palomino its president, nominally the highest political position in the movement. However, as the Junta rarely met, real power rested with Secretaría General, which controlled all communication with regional jefaturas. In terms of internal power struggle, Palomino is currently considered a representative of the Carlist “old wave”, people whose elevation gave comfort to the Traditionalists, but who were ready to accept the new trends. The new setup was worked out in final months of 1967, but was made public in early 1968.

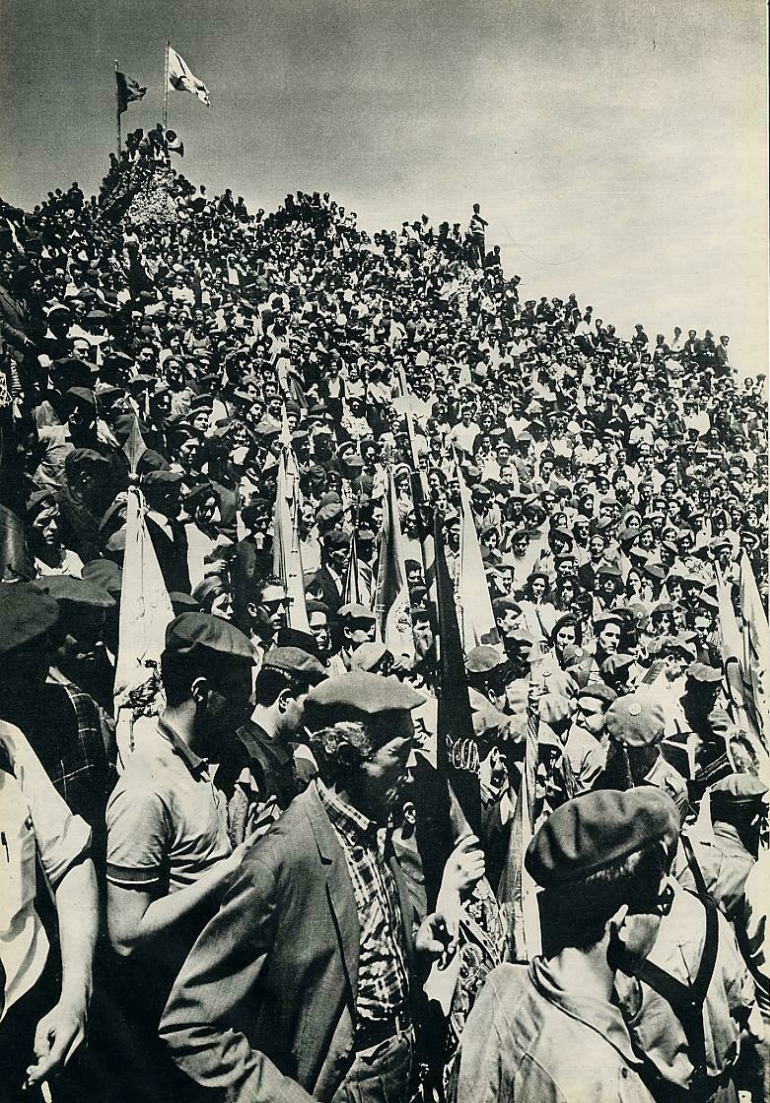
Rally at the summit of Montejurra, late 1960s

At that time Carlist leaders were still hoping that collaborationist stand towards Francoism might eventually bring the dynasty somewhat closer to the throne. In public statements Palomino confirmed this policy to the full; he declared that Comunión Tradicionalista would act within the legal framework, which allows some competition of ideas united by the “spirit of 18 July”, and would work towards the crowning of their claimants. Careful not to breach the limits of loyalty to the regime he carefully hinted about a need for “reconstrucción política de nuestro tiempo” and claimed 500,000 Carlist affiliates in 7,000 círculos; he also stressed that animosity between the Falangists and the Carlists was a thing of the past. However, while Palomino declared no major change to general concilliatory policy of the movement, the Huguistas were already bent on “linea de dura oposición política al Régimen”.

Already in early 1967 Palomino was in presidency of major Carlist rallies like the traditional Montejurra gathering; in 1968 he presided over the Montserrat rally and the Montejurra ascent. It is not clear whether - aged 72 - he climbed the summit, but he played key role during ceremonies at the foothills in the Irache monastery and in Estella. In the summer of 1968 he entertained the infant Don Carlos Hugo and his wife Doña Irene on their tour across southern Spain and in November that year he hosted infanta Maria Teresa in Cadiz and around. Palomino started to feature in Huguista propaganda prints, like the Montejurra review; he was presented as a leader utterly loyal to the dynasty who was first to support all royal initiatives, e.g. opened bank accounts for charity initiative of princess Irene. It is not clear whether he double-hatted as the Andalusian regional jefe.

== Carlist: leader or figurehead (1968–1971) ==
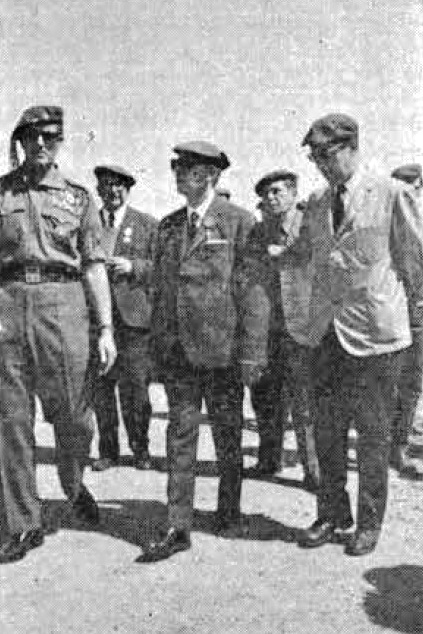
Palomino at Quintillo gathering, 1969

Don Carlos Hugo and the Huguistas were adopting an increasingly challenging stand towards Francoism; the process climaxed when the prince and most of his family were expelled from Spain in late 1968. Palomino presided over the urgently convened sitting of Junta Suprema, which was raided and broken by the police. The later Junta declaration protested the expulsions and maintained that Carlism would never bend to "any group of interest", which probably stood for supporters of Don Juan Carlos. In return, official press published an open letter from a group of requeté ex-combatants aligned with the Juanista claim, who declared that "negamos a esa Junta el derecho a hablar en nombre del Carlismo".

Opposition to Palomino-led jefatura originated also in Carlist circles unrelated to Juanismo and Don Juan Carlos. The traditionalists were increasingly alarmed by progressist, left-wing course adopted by the movement leaders; already in 1968 Palomino started to receive letters protesting implementation of new proto-socialist threads and demanding that he cracks down on subversive currents. Among many voices of dismay the one which gained particular popularity was this of Jesús Evaristo Casariego. In 1970 he first addressed Palomino with an alarming letter, and upon receiving no response he published a pamphlet Interpelación a la Junta Suprema de la Comunión Tradicionalista: ¿A dónde se quiere llevar al Carlismo?, which lambasted some official statements of CT leaders as downright scandalous.

It is not exactly clear what the position of Palomino was and whether – already in his mid-70s – he realized the nature of struggle going on within the movement. Most information available points to his mostly ceremonial appearances, like presidency over homages to Carlist martyrs or over ex-combatant Quintillo rallies, e.g. in 1969 or 1970. Some scholars count him among promoters of the new left-wing course, others assume he was merely acquiescent or disoriented. The only clear guideline he followed was total loyalty to the claimant, who also declared full trust in Palomino; when the latter hinted about inefficiency of the Junta, Don Javier responded that nomination of a new Jefe Delegado was inopportune and that Palomino and the Junta enjoyed his absolute confidence.

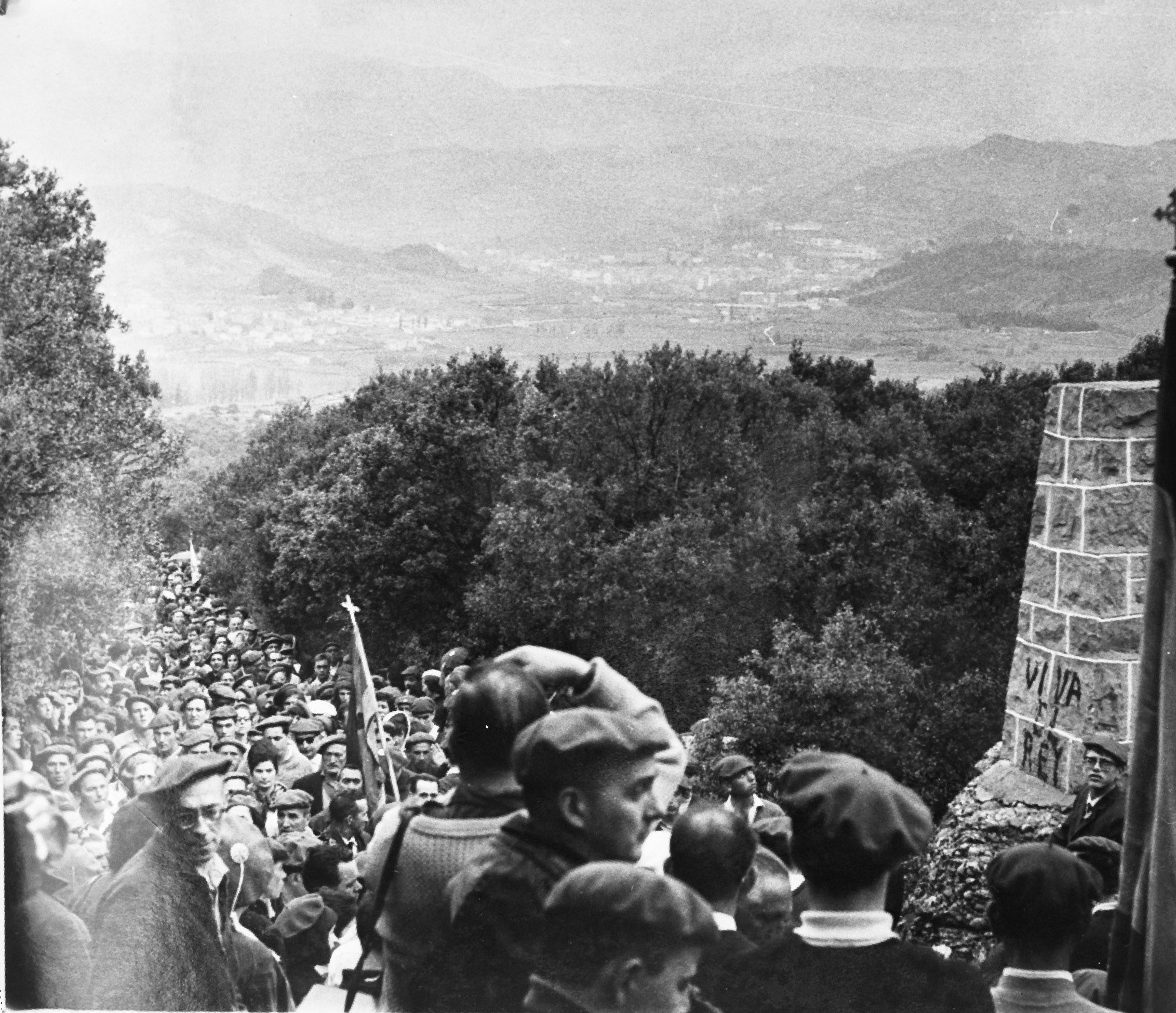
Montejurra ascent, early 1970s

In late 1970 the Huguistas decided to complete their takeover of Carlism by transforming the movement into a mass party of the Left. The change was consumed at Congreso de Pueblo Carlista, staged in France; it is not clear whether Palomino attended. At unclear date between May 1971 and July 1971 he was dismissed from presidency of Junta Suprema, though he remained its member. The official reason quoted was “failure to sort out economic issues entrusted to him”. In September Junta Suprema was dissolved and replaced by Junta de Gobierno; Palomino was not appointed its member. Later this year and in the atmosphere of all-out war between the traditionalists and the progressists, he lost also his seat in executive of the ex-combatant organisation. Following this episode there is no further information on Palomino's public or Carlist activity.

== See also ==
- Carlism
- Traditionalism (Spain)
