= Calm =

Calm or CALM may refer to:

== Arts and entertainment ==
=== Film and television ===
- "The Calm" (Arrow), an episode of Arrow
- The Calm (film), a 1980 film
- Calm, a fictional city in the Kiba (TV series) anime world

=== Music ===
- Calm (group), an American hip hop group
- Calm (album), a 2020 album by 5 Seconds of Summer
- The Calm (Kaskade album)
- The Calm (Hostyle Gospel album)
- The Calm (EP), by Insane Clown Posse
- "The Calm (Interlude)", a song from the album Aquarius (Tinashe album) by Tinashe
- A piece of music from the album Neo Cali by Vektroid

== Businesses and organisations ==
- Calm (company), a software company in San Francisco, California
- Cal-Maine (NASDAQ: CALM), an American egg producer
- Campaign Against Living Miserably, a UK charity
- Department of Conservation and Land Management (Western Australia)

== Laws ==
- Commercial Advertisement Loudness Mitigation Act, U.S. legislation prohibiting TV commercials from being louder than the program on which they are shown
- Conservation and Land Management Act 1984, or CALM Act, Western Australian legislation that created the Department of Conservation and Land Management

== People ==
- Jonathan Calm (born 1971), American visual artist
- Marie Calm (1832–1887), German author and feminist

== Places ==
- Calm, Missouri, a community in the United States
- Intertropical Convergence Zone, also known as The Calms
- California Living Museum, a zoo in Bakersfield, California

== Science and technology ==
- Calmodulin (CaM), calcium-modulated protein
  - CALM2
  - CALM3
- Clathrin-assembly lymphoid myeloid leukaemia protein, see Ap180
- Communications, Air-interface, Long and Medium range, a standardized set of protocols and parameters for high speed communication
  - CALM M5
  - Catenary anchor leg mooring, a type of single buoy mooring for ships

== See also ==
- Calmness
- Cam (disambiguation)
- Christian Apologetics and Research Ministry, an American religious group
- Clam (disambiguation)
- Com (disambiguation)
- Come (disambiguation)
- Kahm, a yeast layer on food
- Kalm, a surname
- Karm, a 1977 Hindi film
