= Palo Cortado =

Variety of sherry

Palo Cortado is a rare variety of sherry that is initially aged under flor to become a fino or amontillado, but inexplicably loses its veil of flor and begins aging oxidatively as an oloroso. The result is a wine with some of the richness of oloroso and some of the crispness of amontillado. Only about 1–2% of the grapes pressed for sherry naturally develop into palo cortado.

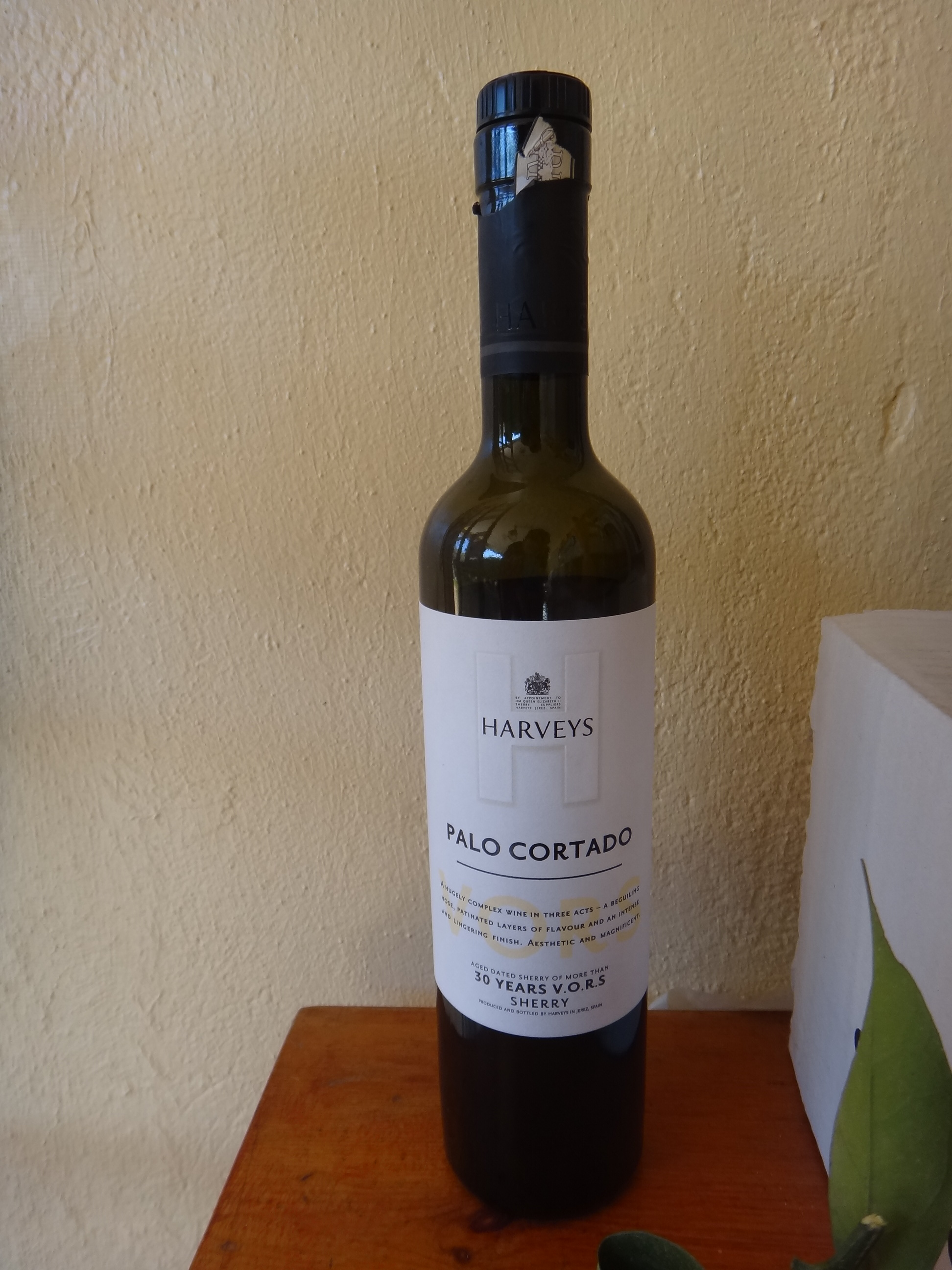
Bottle of palo cortado

== Denomination ==
The name means 'cut stick', in reference to the mark made on the cask when this style of wine is recognized. Since the wine was originally destined to be a fino or amontillado, it will initially have had a single stroke marked on the cask. When the overseer realizes that the wine is becoming a palo cortado, he draws a cross (or cut) through the initial stroke (or stick), resulting in a crossed stroke or 'cut stick' (~~/~~). At this time the wine will be fortified to about 17.5% alcohol, to prevent spoilage from contact with the air. As the overseer continues to monitor the wine over time, he may feel it necessary to add more measures of alcohol to the cask to continue its development. These additional measures are marked on the cask as more crosses, with the resulting wine being designated 'dos cortados', 'tres cortados', etc. according to the number of 'cuts' marked on the cask. The greater the number of cuts, the older the wine.

== Varieties ==
- Jerez Cortado is a variety of palo cortado made not in Jerez, but in Sanlúcar de Barrameda, the most westerly of the three points of the 'Sherry Triangle', properly known as the denominación de Jerez. The city of Jerez is the most easterly point—and Puerto de Santa María lies southwest of that.

On 12 April 2012, the rules applicable to the sweet and fortified Denominations of Origin Montilla-Moriles and Jerez-Xérès-Sherry were changed. The classification by sweetness is:

Fortified wine type	Alcohol % ABV	Sugar content (grams per litre)
Fino	15–17	0–5
Amontillado	16–17	0–5
Palo Cortado	17–22	0–5
Oloroso	17–22	0–5

== Serving ==
Palo Cortado can be served as an apéritif with olives, nuts, cheese, or foie gras; it can also accompany fowl, red meats, or game. It should be served slightly chilled.

== Storing ==
As palo cortado falls between amontillado and oloroso, it is relatively stable and may be stored for a few years before opening. After opening, it can be kept, corked and refrigerated, for a few weeks.
