= Manzanilla (wine) =

Type of Spanish fortified wine

Coordinates: 36°46′25″N 6°21′25″W

Manzanilla-Sanlúcar de Barrameda DOP
- Wine region
- Manzanilla – Sanlúcar de Barrameda DOP in the province of Cádiz in the region of Andalusia
- Official name: D.O.P. Manzanilla-Sanlúcar de Barrameda
- Type: Denominación de Origen Protegida (DOP)
- Year established: 1964
- Country: Spain
- No. of vineyards: 6,989 hectares (17,270 acres)
- No. of wineries: 12 for production of grapes, 23 for maturing of sherry
- Wine produced: 384,350 hectolitres
- Comments: Data for 2016 / 2017 for Jerez-Xérès-Sherry and Manzanilla S.B. DOPs

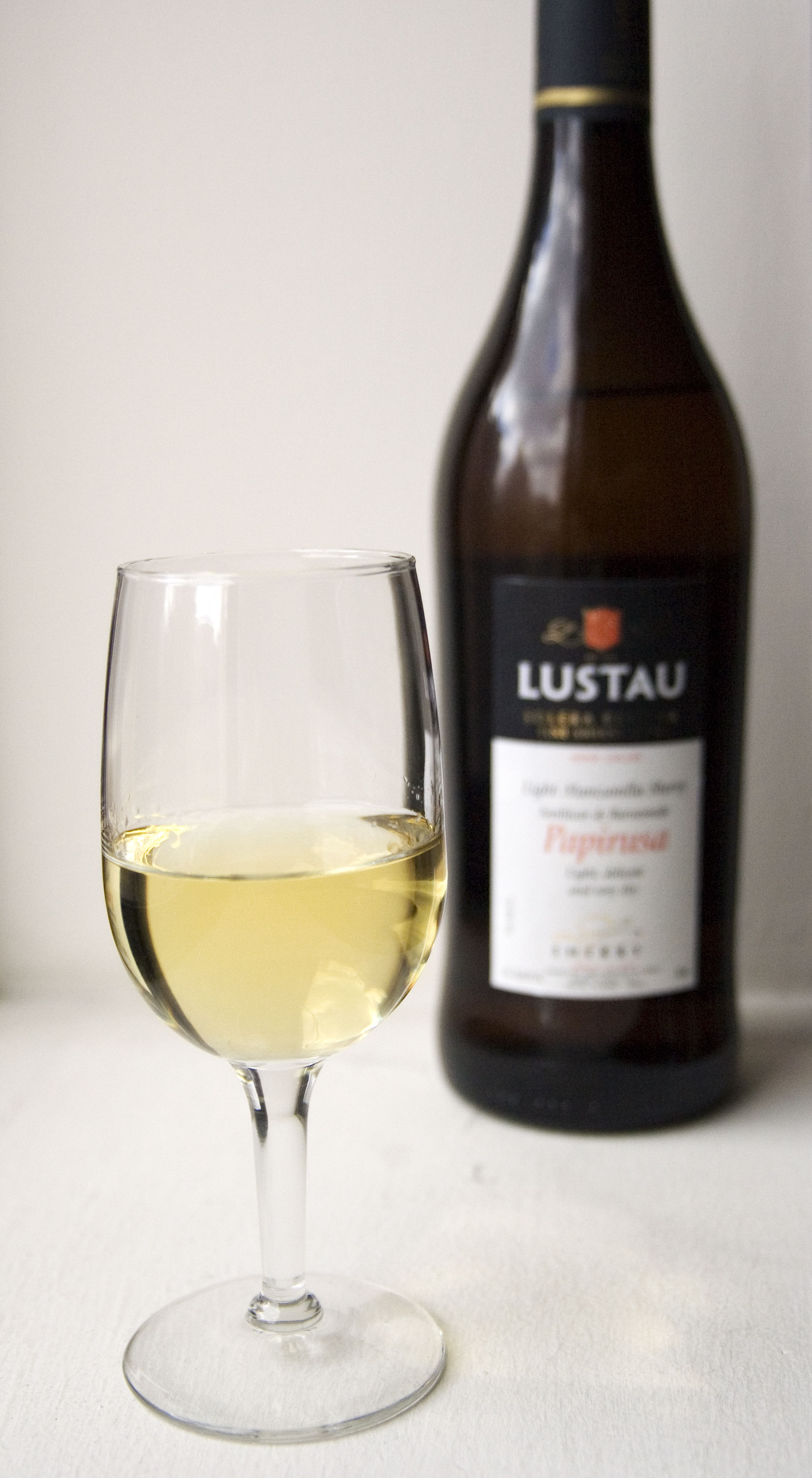
A glass of manzanilla

Manzanilla is a fortified wine similar to fino sherry made in the port of Sanlúcar de Barrameda, in the province of Cádiz, Andalusia (Spain), and is produced under the Spanish Denominación de Origen Protegida (DOP) of Manzanilla-Sanlúcar de Barrameda DOP. In Spanish, a chamomile infusion is called "manzanilla"—this wine gets its name because the wine's aroma is said to be reminiscent of such an infusion.

Manzanilla is manufactured using the same methods as a fino sherry and results in a very pale, dry wine. It is often described as having a savoury and salty flavour, believed to develop from the chalky soil near the sea estuary of the Guadalquivir river. Sanlúcar de Barrameda's cool temperatures and high humidity contribute to a higher yield of flor yeast than in Jerez or El Puerto de Santa María. The thicker cap of flor better protects the wine from contact with the air, resulting in a fresher, more delicate flavour than a fino from Jerez. It is typically aged for three to five years in a solera, but some types may be aged longer.

== Special types of Manzanilla ==
- Manzanilla Pasada is a Manzanilla aged longer than usual (approximately seven years), so that its veil of flor begins to fade, though not long enough to become an Amontillado.
- Manzanilla Amontillada is similar to a Manzanilla pasada but in some cases aged as long as 12 years, taking on more of the qualities of an Amontillado.
- Manzanilla Olorosa is a rich form of Manzanilla that takes on the quality of Oloroso through extended aging, sometimes as much as 30 years.
- Jerez Cortado is a Palo Cortado made from Manzanilla.

On 12 April 2012, the rules applicable to the sweet and fortified Denominations of Origen Montilla-Moriles and Jerez-Xérès-Sherry were changed.

The classification by sweetness is:

Fortified wine type	Alcohol % ABV	Sugar content (grams per litre)
Fino	15–17	0–5
Manzanilla	15–17	0–5
Pale Cream	15.5–22	45–115

== Authorised grape varieties ==
The authorised grape varieties are the same as those of Jerez-Xérès-Sherry DOP:

- White: Palomino, Pedro Ximénez, Moscatel de Grano Menudo, and Moscatel de Alejandría

== Serving ==
Manzanilla is best served chilled at 7–10 °C (45–50 °F). In Spain it is often served with olives, almonds, or other tapas such as Jamón serrano or seafood.

It is also popular in the cocktail Rebujito.

== Storing ==
Like fino, manzanilla is a delicate form of sherry and should be drunk within a year of bottling. Once opened it will immediately begin to deteriorate and should be drunk in one sitting for the best results. If necessary it can be stored, corked and refrigerated, for up to one week after opening.

== In popular culture ==
The 1875 French opera Carmen by Georges Bizet features a well-known aria, 'Près des remparts de Séville', in which the titular character, after being detained, seduces the guard assigned to her into freeing her by promising that they will visit her friend's tavern where they will dance and drink manzanilla.

Part of a scene in chapter 4 of the 2018 movie Life Itself, where Vincent Saccione, the character of Antonio Banderas, offers the drink to one of his employees.
