= Clam (disambiguation) =

Clams are aquatic molluscs with hinged shells.

Clam may also refer to:

== Places ==
- Clam, Charente-Maritime, France
- Clam, Virginia, United States
- Burg Clam, Austria

== Science and technology ==
- ClamAV, an antimalware toolkit
- CLAM (audio software), an audio data processing framework
- CLaMS, a modular chemistry transport model

== Television ==
- Clam (Camp Lazlo), an animated rhinoceros character (aired 2005–2008)
- "Clams" (SpongeBob SquarePants), a 2002 episode

== Other uses ==
- Cape Libraries Automated Materials Sharing (CLAMS), a library network in southeast Massachusetts
- Clement Attlee (1883–1967), nicknamed "Clam"
- A member or constituent group of the Clamshell Alliance, an American anti-nuclear activist group
- Clam-Martinic family

== See also ==
- Klam, Austria
- KLAM, a radio station
