= Montepila =

Variety of grape

- Grape (Vitis)
- Color of berry skin: Blanc
- Species: Vitis vinifera
- Origin: Spain

Montepila is a white Spanish wine grape. It is one of the authorized varieties in the Montilla-Moriles Denominación de Origen (DO), in Andalusia, Spain.

Montepila is not known under any other synonyms.
