= Moriles =

- Municipality
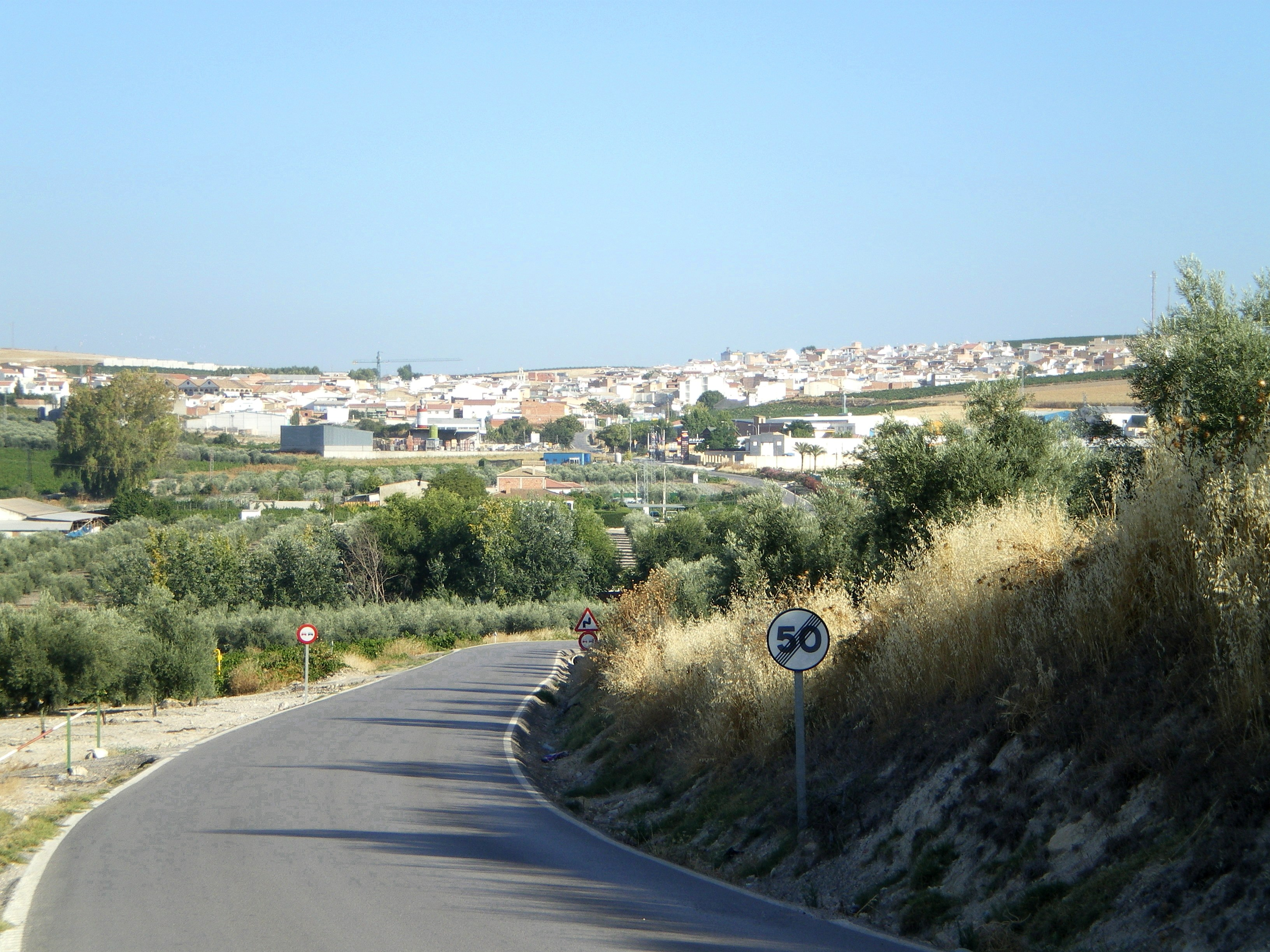
- View on Moriles (July 2009)

- Flag Seal

- Location in Spain.
- Country: Spain
- Autonomous community: Andalusia
- Province: Córdoba

Area
  - Total: 20 km^{2} (7.7 sq mi)
- Elevation: 375 m (1,230 ft)

Population (2025-01-01)
  - Total: 3,667
  - Density: 180/km^{2} (470/sq mi)
- Time zone: UTC+1 (CET)
  - Summer (DST): UTC+2 (CEST)
- Website: https://www.moriles.es/

Moriles is a town and municipality in the province of Córdoba (Andalusia, Spain). In 2018 it had a population of 3,726. The municipality covers an area of about 20 km^{2} and has a population density of about 194 inhabitants/km^{2}. The town is located about 65 km south of the provincial capital, Córdoba, at an altitude of 375 m above sea level.

It is known for its olive oil and fortified sherry-like wines known as Montilla-Moriles.

== History ==
The history of the region dates back to pre-Roman times. The present village was formed in the second half of the 18th century from the merger of several small hamlets. The village was called "Zapateros" and was part of the municipality of Aguilar de la Frontera. In 1912, it separated from Aguilar and became a new municipality under the name "Moriles".

== See also ==
- List of municipalities in Córdoba

== Bibliography ==
- Villar Movellán, Alberto (1995). Guía artística de la provincia de Córdoba. Universidad de Córdoba.
