= Kahm =

Layer of yeast formed on fermented foods

Kahm or Kahm yeast is a layer of wild yeast which sometimes is formed on fermented foods such as sauerkraut. It is typically harmless but the smell and appearance tends to spoil the food. The yeast genera which form these films include Debaryomyces, Mycoderma and Pichia.

The word “kahm” traces back to the Middle High German “kan” which in turn derives from the Vulgar Latin “cana” (greyish layer of dirt on wine).

== See also ==
- Flor – a layer of yeast which forms on the surface of wine
- Pellicle (cooking) – a skin which develops in smoked foods
