= ACM Multimedia =

Annual conference series on multimedia

- Discipline: multimedia

Publication details
- Publisher: ACM SIGMM
- History: 1993-
- Frequency: annual

ACM SIGMM Records
- Language: English
- Edited by: Carsten Griwodz e.a.

Publication details
- History: 2009-present
- Frequency: quarterly

Standard abbreviations
- ISO 4: ACM SIGMM Rec.

Indexing
- ISSN: 1947-4598

Links
- Journal homepage

ACM Multimedia (ACM-MM) is the Association for Computing Machinery (ACM)'s annual conference on multimedia, sponsored by the SIGMM special interest group on multimedia in the ACM. SIGMM specializes in the field of multimedia computing, from underlying technologies to applications, theory to practice, and servers to networks to devices.

In 2003, the conference was given an "Estimated impact factor" of 1.22 by CiteSeer, placing it in the top 15% of computer science publication venues. In 2006 the Computing Research and Education Association of Australasia awarded it an 'A+' ranking for conferences attended by Australian academics and in 2012 it received an 'A1' rating from the Brazilian ministry of education.

== Past Conferences ==
Year	Date	Venue	City	Country	Notes
2024	Oct 28 - Nov 1	Melbourne Convention Exhibition Centre	Melbourne	Australia	
2023	Oct 29 - Nov 3	Westin Ottawa hotel	Ottawa	Canada	
2022	Oct 10 - 14	Lisbon Congress Center	Lisbon	Portugal	
2021	Oct 20 - 24	The Langbo Chengdu (Hybrid)	Chengdu	China	
2020	Oct 12 - 16	Virtual	Seattle	United States	
2019	Oct 21 - 25		Nice	France	
2018	Oct 22 - 26		Seoul	South Korea	
2017	Oct 23 - 27		California	USA	
2016	Oct 15 - 19		Amsterdam	Netherlands	
2015	Oct 26 - 30		Brisbane	Australia	
2014	Nov 03 - 07		Orlando	USA	
2013	Oct 21 - 25		Barcelona	Spain	
2012	Oct 27 - 31	Nara Prefectural New Public Hall	Nara	Japan	
2011	Noc 28 - Dec 1st	Hyatt Regency Scottsdale Resort and Spa @ Gainey Ranch	Scottsdale, Arizona	United States	
2010	Oct 25 - 29	Palazzo degli Affari	Firenze	Italy	
2009	Oct 19 - 24	Beijing Hotel	Beijing	China	
2008	Oct 27 – Nov 1	Pan Pacific Hotel	Vancouver, BC	Canada	
2007	Sep 24–29	University of Augsburg	Augsburg	Germany	
2006	Oct 23–27	Fess Parker's DoubleTree Resort Hotel	Santa Barbara	United States	ISBN 1-59593-447-2
2005	Nov 6–11	Hilton	Singapore	Singapore	ISBN 1-59593-044-2
2004	Oct 10–16		New York	United States	ISBN 1-58113-893-8
2003	Nov 2–8		Berkeley, California	United States	ISBN 1-58113-722-2
2002	Dec 1–6		Juan-les-Pins on the French Riviera	France	ISBN 1-58113-620-X
2001	Sep 30 - Oct 5		Ottawa	Canada	ISBN 1-58113-394-4
2000	Oct 30 - Nov 3	Marina del Rey	Los Angeles, CA	United States	Proceedings: ISBN 1-58113-198-4; Workshops: ISBN 1-58113-311-1
1999	Oct 30 - Nov 5		Orlando, Florida	United States	Proc. Part 1: ISBN 1-58113-151-8; Proc. Part 2: ISBN 1-58113-239-5
1998	Sep 12–16	University of Bristol	Bristol	United Kingdom	ISBN 0-201-30990-4
1997	Nov 9–13		Seattle, WA	United States	ISBN 0-89791-991-2
1996	Nov 18 - 22	Hynes Convention Center	Boston, MA	United States	ISBN 0-89791-871-1
1995	Nov 5–9		San Francisco, CA	United States	ISBN 0-89791-751-0
1994	Oct 15–20		San Francisco, CA	United States	ISBN 0-89791-686-7
1993	Aug 1–6		Anaheim, CA.	United States	ISBN 0-89791-596-8

== ACM Multimedia workshops ==
- The first international workshop on Continuous Archival and Retrieval of Personal Experience (CARPE 2004) covered "capture, retrieval, organization, search, privacy, and legal issues" surrounding "continuous archival and retrieval of all media relating to personal experiences"; speakers included Steve Mann and Gordon Bell.

== Open Source Competition ==
Starting in 2004, ACM Multimedia hosts an Open Source competition, providing an award for the best Open Source computer program(s).

- 2015:
  - Winner: Chris Sweeney, Tobias Hollerer, Matthew Turk, "Theia: A Fast and Scalable Structure-from-Motion Library"
- 2014:
  - Winner: Yangqing Jia, Evan Shelhamer, Jeff Donahue, Sergey Karayev, Jonathan Long, Ross Girshick, Sergio Guadarrama, Trevor Darrell, "Caffe: Convolutional Architecture for Fast Feature Embedding"
- 2013:
  - Winner: Dmitry Bogdanov, Nicolas Wack, Emilia Gómez, Sankalp Gulati, Perfecto Herrera, Oscar Mayor, Gerard Roma, Justin Salamon, Jose Zapata Xavier Serra (UPF), “ESSENTIA: an Audio Analysis Library for Music Information Retrieval”
- 2012:
  - Winner: Petr Holub, Jiri Matela, Martin Pulec, Martin Srom, “UltraGrid: Low-latency high-quality video transmissions on commodity hardware”
- 2011:
  - Winner: J. Hare, S. Samangooei, D. Dupplaw, “OpenIMAJ and ImageTerrier: Java Libraries and Tools for Scalable Multimedia Analysis and Indexing of Images”
  - Honorable Mention:“ClassX – An Open Source Interactive Lecture Streaming System” “Opencast Matterhorn 1.1: Reaching New Heights” Presented by Profs. Pablo Cesar and Wei Tsang Ooi
- 2010:
  - Andrea Vedaldi, Brian Fulkerson, VLFeat – An open and portable library of computer vision algorithms – VLFeat
  - Rob Hess, An Open-Source SIFT Library – Open-Source SIFT
  - Florian Eyben, Martin Woellmer, Bjoern Schuller, openSMILE – The Munich Versatile and Fast Open-Source Audio Feature Extractor – openSMILE
- 2009: Caliph & Emir, MPEG-7 photo annotation and retrieval
- 2008: Network-Integrated Multimedia Middleware (NMM).
- 2007: Programming Web Multimedia Applications with Hop.
- 2006: CLAM (C++ Library for Audio and Music) (CLAM), an open source framework for audio and music research and application development.
- 2005: OpenVIDIA, a GPU accelerated Computer Vision Library.
- 2004: Two winners
  - ChucK, an audio programming language for real-time synthesis, composition, performance, and analysis.
  - Flavor, A Formal Language for Audio-Visual Object Representation

== Other conferences on the same topic ==
- ACM International Conference on Multimedia Retrieval (ICMR)
- ACM International Conference on Multimedia Modeling (MMM)
- ACM Multimedia Systems Conference (MMSYS)
- IEEE International Conference Multimedia Expo (ICME)
- IEEE International Symposium on Multimedia (ISM)
- IEEE International Packet Video Workshop (PV)

== Other conferences on related topics ==
- ACM SIGGRAPH
- NIME
- International Computer Music Conference (ICMC)
