= Clam, Virginia =

Unincorporated community in Virginia, United States

Coordinates: 37°48′49″N 75°40′13″W

Clam is an unincorporated community of approximately 50 residents in Accomack County, Virginia, United States.
