= Jonathan Calm =

Jonathan Calm (born 1971) is an American visual artist in the media of photography and video.

== Early life and education ==
Calm was born in New York. He received his BFA from Montclair State University in 1997 and his MFA from Columbia University in 2000.

== Career ==
Calm's work has been exhibited in galleries and museums internationally, and written about in many publications. In 2008 he was the recipient of an Art Matters grant.

Since 2009, Calm has been dividing his time between his native New York and Boston, where he teaches and is director of the Senior Thesis Program at the School of the Museum of Fine Arts, Boston.

== Work ==
Jonathan Calm's photo and video work explores connections with the aesthetics of sculpture, documentary journalism, and architecture. The architectural development of public housing and its socio-cultural, historical and geopolitical impact on local and global urban communities constitutes a major theme in his art.

Calm was one of the featured artists in the Renaissance Society of Chicago's 2008 Black Is, Black Ain't exhibition, which showcased racially related themes of what has been called Post-Blackness.

Calm participated in the 2015 Pulse New York Art Fair.

== Exhibitions ==
=== Selected solo exhibitions ===
- “Jonathan Calm: Chambers,” LMAKprojects, New York, NY, 2014
- “Jonathan Calm: Projects,” Caren Golden Fine Art, New York, NY, 2008
- “Scratching Chance ,” Jersey City Museum, Jersey City, NJ, 2008
- “Offline & Infamous,” Caren Golden Fine Art, New York, NY, 2005
- “Liquor, Lotto and Chinese Food,” Caren Golden Fine Art, New York, NY, 2002

=== Selected group exhibitions and screenings ===
- "2013 deCordova Biennial," deCordova Sculpture Park and Museum, Lincoln, MA, 2013-2014
- “New Visions: Emerging Trends in African American Art,“ Smithsonian Institution, Anacostia Museum and Center for African American History and Culture, Washington, DC, 2003

== In print ==
- Copeland, Huey. “The Blackness of Blackness,” Artforum, October, 2009, p. 151
- Hunt, David. “Jonathan Calm,” Artext, Fall 2002 (illus.)
- Minto, Brooke. “Frequency,” catalogue essay, Studio Museum of Art, NYC, Nov 9, 2005–March 12, 2006, pp. 34–35 (illus.)
- Pollack, Barbara, “Frequency,” Art News, Feb. 2006, p. 129
- Reimer, Karen and Hamza Walker, Black is, Black Ain't, catalogue, 2013
- Sirmans, Franklin. “Mass Appeal: The Art Object and Hip Hop Culture,” catalogue essay, Gallery 101, Ottawa, Canada, August 2002
- Valdez, Sarah. “Report From New York, Bling and Beyond,” Art in America, April 2006, p. 63 (illus.)
- Young, Lisa J. “Jonathan Calm,” Tema Celeste, July–August, 2002, p. 90 (illus.)
- Zamudio, Raul. “Superimposition,” Tema Celeste
