= Montilla-Moriles =

Wine region of Spain

Coordinates: 37°35′7.6″N 4°38′22.2″W

Montilla - Moriles DOP
- Wine region
- Montilla - Moriles DO in the province of Córdoba
- Official name: D.O.P Montilla - Moriles
- Type: Denominación de Origen Protegida (DOP)
- Year established: 1932
- Country: Spain
- No. of vineyards: 5,025 hectares (12,417 acres)
- No. of wineries: 41
- Wine produced: 206,960 hectolitres
- Comments: Data for 2016 / 2017 for Málaga and Sierras de Málaga DOPs

The 6 DO wine regions in Andalusia (Spain)

Montilla-Moriles is a Spanish Denominación de Origen Protegida (DOP) for wines located in the southern part of the province of Córdoba (Andalusia, Spain). It is bounded by the river Genil to the east, by the river Guadajoz to the west, by the river Guadalquivir to the north, and by the Subbetic Range of mountains to the south.

This region produces mainly sweet dessert wines using similar techniques to those used for the production of sherry, that is, by crianza bajo velo de flor (which involves allowing a "veil" of flor yeast to form on the surface of the must in the casks) and por el sistema de criaderas y soleras (which refers to the process of aging the wine in soleras). Apart from forming a barrier between the wine and the air, the flor also cause certain chemical phenomena in the wine which affect the taste: they consume glycerine (thus conferring a typically dry character to the wine), they significantly reduce the volatile acidity level of the wine, and they produce great quantities of paraldehydes and acetaldehydes which are responsible for the almond notes of the wines.

The DOP includes the following municipalities in their entirety: Montilla, Moriles, Doña Mencía, Montalbán de Córdoba, Monturque, Nueva Carteya and Puente Genil; and covers part of the following municipalities: Aguilar de la Frontera, Baena, Cabra, Castro del Río, Espejo, Fernán Núñez, La Rambla, Lucena, Montemayor, and Santaella. Within this DO, there are two High Quality Subzones (Subzonas de Calidad Superior) consisting of land that has been selected for its special soil characteristics: Sierra de Montilla and Los Moriles Altos. Production limits are regularly set at 80 hl/ha in the main DO and at 60 hl/ha in the High Quality Zones.

== History ==
The names of wine-producing regions have been used for thousands of years to identify and qualify specific wines, including the ancient Egyptians, Greeks and Romans. In those days, the wines from Cyprus, Falerno and Bética were renowned. Homer's Iliad and Odyssey mentions the wines from Lemnos, Samos, Pédalos and Itaca. However, it was only towards the end of the 19th century that the use of geographic names was first regulated by law to prevent fraud. In 1883 the Convenio de la Unión de Paris on intellectual property was signed.

In 1947 the Oficina Internacional de la Viña y el Vino stated that a wine could not have a DO unless it had a long tradition and an acknowledged reputation.

The Arreglo de Lisboa (1958) defined a DO as: a geographic area of a country, region or location used to define a product whose qualities or characteristics are exclusively or essentially due to said geographic area, including natural and human factors.

Law 25/1970, Estatuto de la Viña, del Vino y de los Alcoholes defined a DO as follows: the name of a region, area or location used to designate a product related to vines, wine or liquors from said areas, which have singular qualities or characteristics mainly due to the environment and to the aging and production methods.

The name of Montilla started to be used to designate the singular wines from that area in the mid 19th century, via participation in international wine fairs. The name of Moriles started to be used in 1912, when the old name of Zapateros was changes to the current name.

The full name, Montilla-Moriles, was first used in 1891 during the Arreglo de Madrid, revised in Washington in 1911 and finally ratified in The Hague in 1925. However, it was only with the Estatuto de la Viña y el Vino in 1932 that the name was finally protected by law, establishing that only the producers in the protected area could legally use the name.

The Spanish Civil War delayed the founding of the Regulatory Council of the DO until 1944, and the Regulations were finally approved in 1945, the first Chairman being Luis Merino del Castillo. There are currently 84 wineries (bodegas) listed in the DO.

== Soil ==
The white soil of Montilla-Moriles is rich in calcium carbonate; the soil and subsoil are formed by soft loams, poor in natural organic material, and are not very fertile. The soil has a very simple mineral structure, basically limestone and silica, and has a lumpy pastry-like structure, with a low content of chlorides and sulphates. The subsoil has high moisture retention properties of around 30%.

== Climate ==
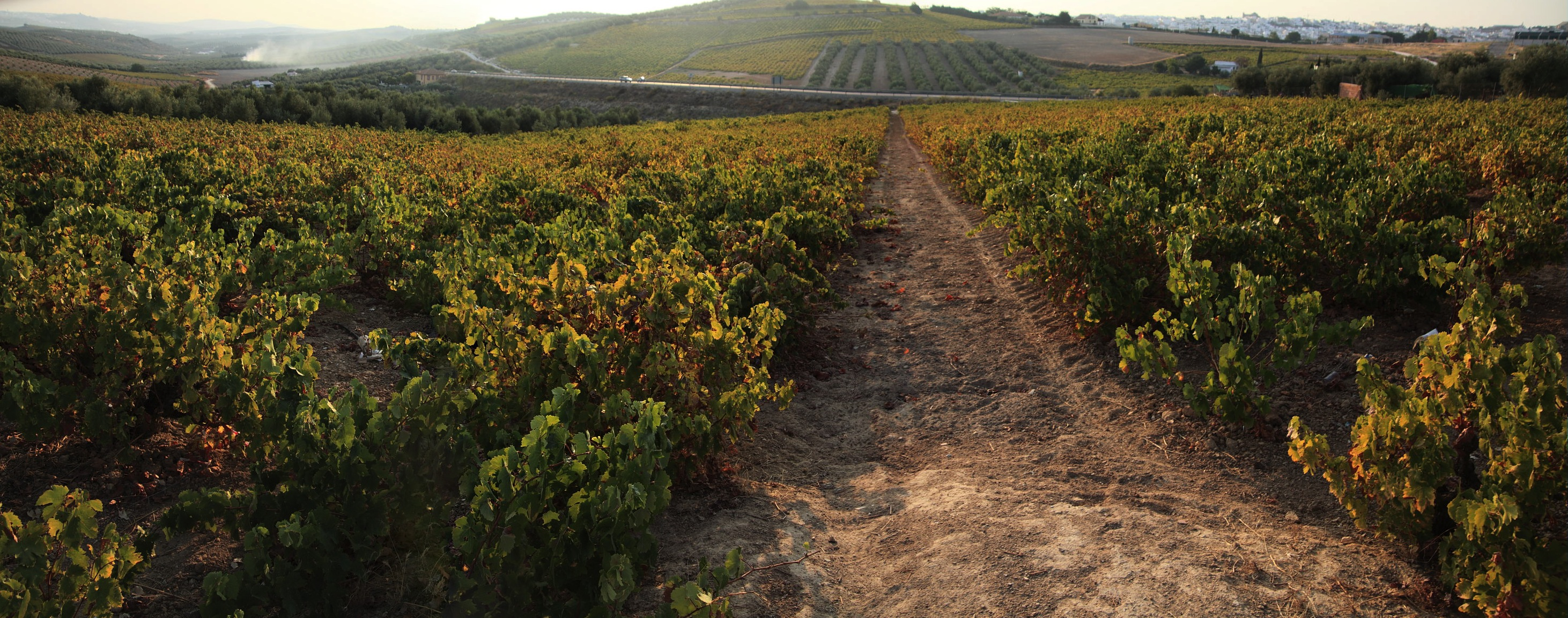
Montilla-Moriles DOP vineyards

The climate is a semi-continental mediterranean climate with long, hot, dry summers and short winters. The mean maximum temperature is about 26 °C and the mean minimum temperature is about 12 °C. There is about 2,800 to 3,000 hours of effective sunlight per annum, and rainfall is between 500 mm and 1000 mm per annum.

The vineyards of the DOP are at an altitude of between 125 m and 600 m above sea level.

== Authorised Grape varieties ==
The authorised grape varieties, all white, are: Sauvignon Blanc, Baladí Verdejo, Pedro Ximénez, Moscatel de Grano Menudo, Moscatel de Alejandría, Macabeo, Torrontés, Verdejo, Chardonnay, and Lairén

== Wines ==
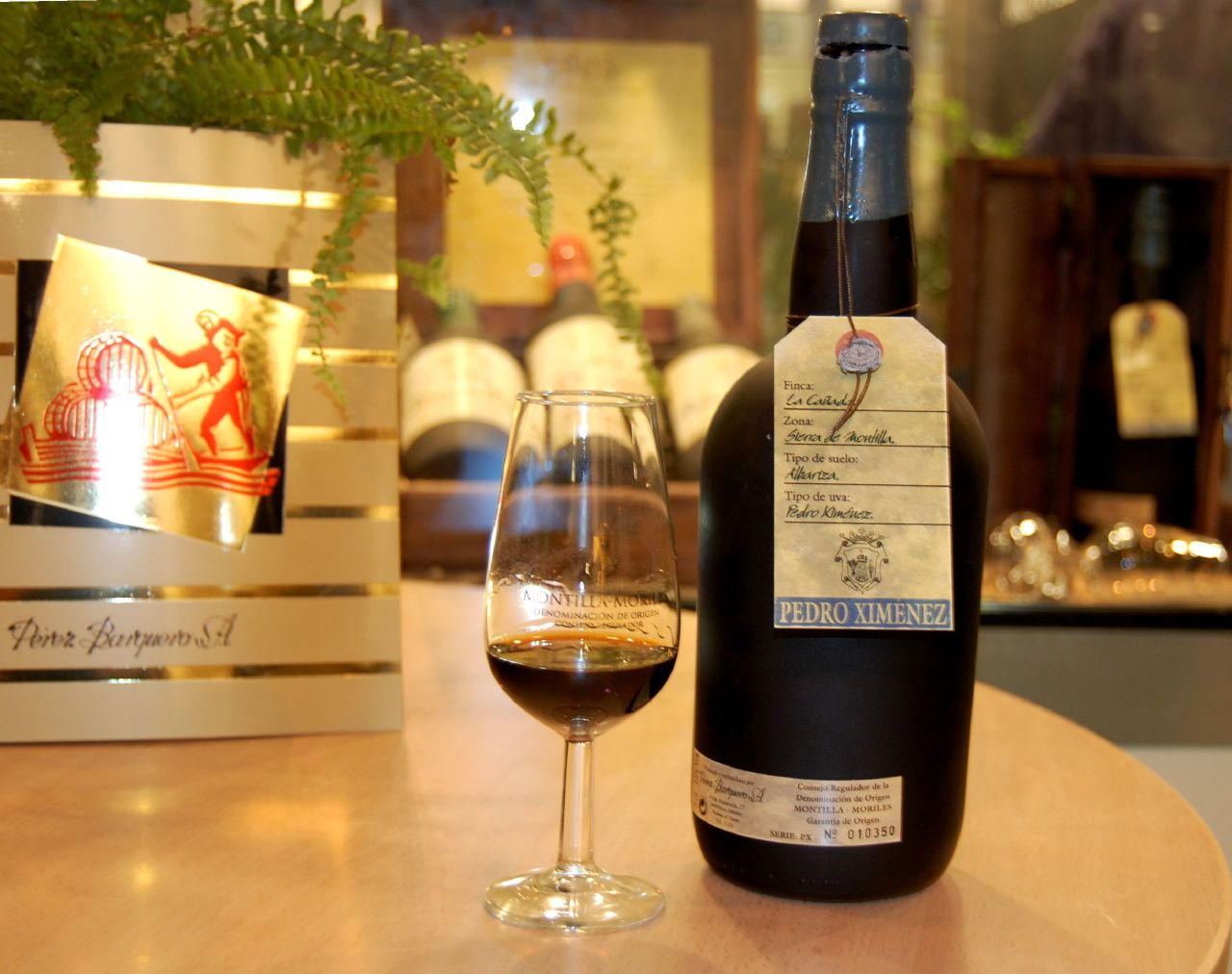
A Pedro Ximénez wine from the Montilla-Moriles DOP

Most of the wine produced in Montilla-Moriles is classified on the same system as sherry, though unlike sherry it is not fortified. Wines are classified based on how long they are aged, in increasing order: joven, crianza, and generoso.

- vino joven (young wine) or joven afrutado (fruity youth): All five of the grape types mentioned above can be used for making this wine. The grapes are usually harvested when the sugar content reaches around 190 g/L. The wines obtained are pale in colour, almost watery, transparent and bright, fruity in the nose and either dry or slightly sweet in the mouth.
- Fino: The most common wine of the region. A clean, bright, light wine, yellow in colour in general while the ones from Moriles can have olive coloured overtones. In the nose, these are complex, subtle and delicate wines. Notes of yeast, almonds, tobacco and sometimes liquorice are the most common aromas. In the mouth, they are dry, bitter and smooth at the same time, and persistent in taste.
- Amontillado: This is what results from allowing fino to age for many years under the correct conditions. As the fino oxidizes, its colour changes to amber or brown-yellow, and the taste increases in complexity. It has a persistent, dry and flavoursome taste in the mouth.
- Oloroso: Aged, dark mahogany or topaz colour is due to the slow oxidization of the base wine. In the nose it is more complete than the amontillado, but less complex, with clear balsamic overtones. Velvety, full-bodied, lively and smooth at the same time, in the mouth.
- Palo cortado: A wine that has the colour and nose of the amontillado, and the mouth of the oloroso.
- Moscatel: A natural sweet wine made from the moscatel grape when it is very ripe or even almost turned to raisins. There are many types of moscatel wine, ranging from young sweet wines to old, aged wines with complex aromas and tastes.
- Pedro Ximenez: In addition there is a type of straw wine: a thick, sweet, syrupy, dark (almost black) wine made only from Pedro Ximénez grapes that have been sun-dried.

Montilla brandy can be made with the distillate of the third pressing and then passed through a solera system of its own.
