= CLAM (audio software) =

CLAM (C++ Library for Audio and Music)
- Developer(s): Music Technology Group, Universitat Pompeu Fabra
- Initial release: 2000
- Repository: clam-project.org/clam/
- Written in: C++
- Operating system: Linux, Microsoft Windows, Mac OS
- Available in: English
- Type: Audio and music research, application development
- License: GPL
- Website: clam-project.org

CLAM (C++ Library for Audio and Music) is an open-source framework for research and application development in the audio and music domain. It is based on the concept of data-processing modules linked into a network. Modules can perform complex audio signal analysis, transformations and synthesis. CLAM also provides a uniform interface to common tasks within audio applications, such as accessing audio devices and audio files. CLAM serves as a library for C++ application development, but a graphical interface also allows full applications to be built without coding. It won the 2006 ACM Multimedia Open Source Competition.
