= Montilla =

- Municipality
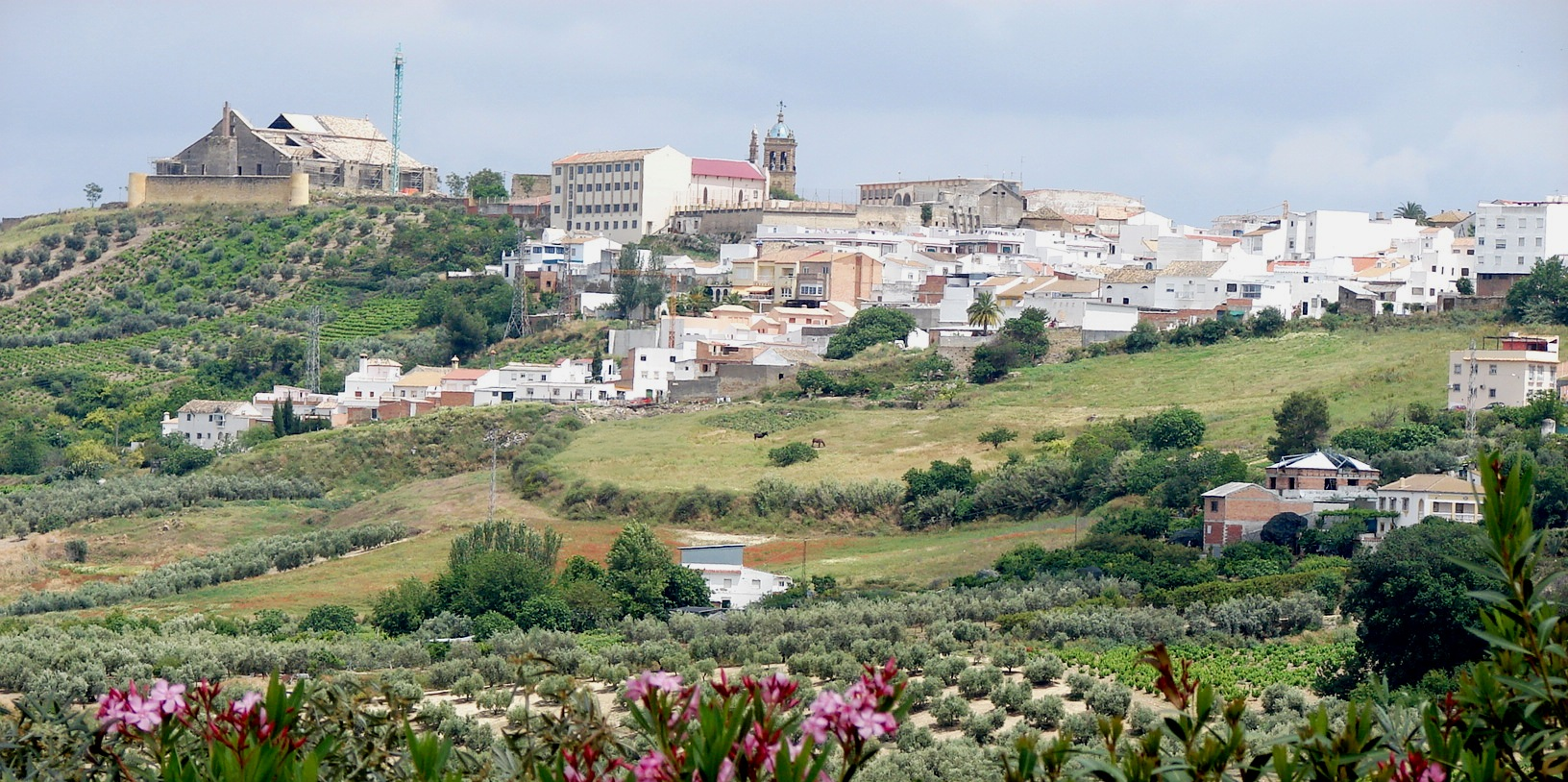
- View of Montilla

- Coat of arms

- Location in Spain Montilla (Andalusia)
- Coordinates: 37°35′12″N 4°38′19″W
- Country: Spain
- Autonomous Community: Andalusia
- Province: Córdoba

Government
  - Mayor: Rafael Llamas (PSOE)

Area
  - Total: 168.5 km^{2} (65.1 sq mi)
- Elevation (AMSL): 371 m (1,217 ft)

Population (2025-01-01)
  - Total: 22,305
  - Density: 132.4/km^{2} (342.8/sq mi)
- Time zone: UTC+1 (CET)
  - Summer (DST): UTC+2 (CEST (GMT +2))
- Postal code: 14550
- Area code: +34 (Spain) + 957 (Córdoba)
- Website: Town Hall

Montilla (Spanish pronunciation: [monˈtiʎa]) is a town and municipality of Spain, located in the autonomous community of Andalusia. As of 2017, the town had a population of 23,209, which makes it the fourth most populated municipality of the Province of Córdoba. It lies 32 miles south of the provincial capital, Córdoba.

== Food and drink ==
The olive oil of the district is abundant and good, and it is the peculiar flavour of the pale dry light wine of Montilla that gives its name to the sherry known as Amontillado. Montilla is the largest component of the Montilla-Moriles designated wine region. The large wineries Alvear and Gran Barquero are located in Montilla, which has an annual vendimia (wine-harvest) festival.

== Cultural heritage ==
Local folkloric figures are the witches "las Camachas", mentioned by Cervantes in the "Dialogue of the Dogs". The central portion of that work is set in a convent which today contains the town hall (in Spanish, ayuntamiento).

== Notable residents ==
Montilla was the birthplace of "The Great Captain," Gonzalo or Gonsalvo of Córdoba (1453-1515), and contains the ruined castle of his father, Pedro Fernández de Córdoba. El Inca Garcilaso de la Vega lived thirty years in Montilla, and the future saint Juan de Ávila lived for the last fifteen years of his life in Montilla, where he is buried.

== See also ==
- List of municipalities in Córdoba
