= Fino =

Variety of fortified wine

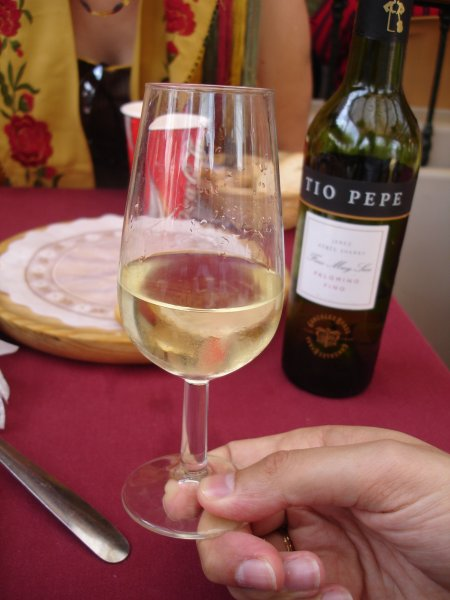
Drinking fino

Fino ("fine" "refinado" "refined" in Spanish) is the driest and palest of the traditional varieties of sherry and Montilla-Moriles fortified wine. They are consumed comparatively young and, unlike the sweeter varieties, should be consumed soon after the bottle is opened as exposure to air can cause them to lose their flavour within hours.

== Flor ==
The defining component of Fino sherries is the strain of yeast known as flor that floats in a layer on top of sherry in the wine barrel. Until the mid-19th century, most sherry winemakers did not understand what this yellowish foam that randomly appeared in some of their barrels was. They would mark these barrels as "sick" and relegate them to their lowest bottlings of wine. It turned out that this strain of Saccharomyces yeast thrived in air, and the more "headroom" there was in the barrel, the more likely it was to develop. Over time winemakers noticed that these wines were lighter and fresher than their other sherries, with the flor acting as a protective blanket over the wine that shielded it from excessive oxidation.

== Varieties ==
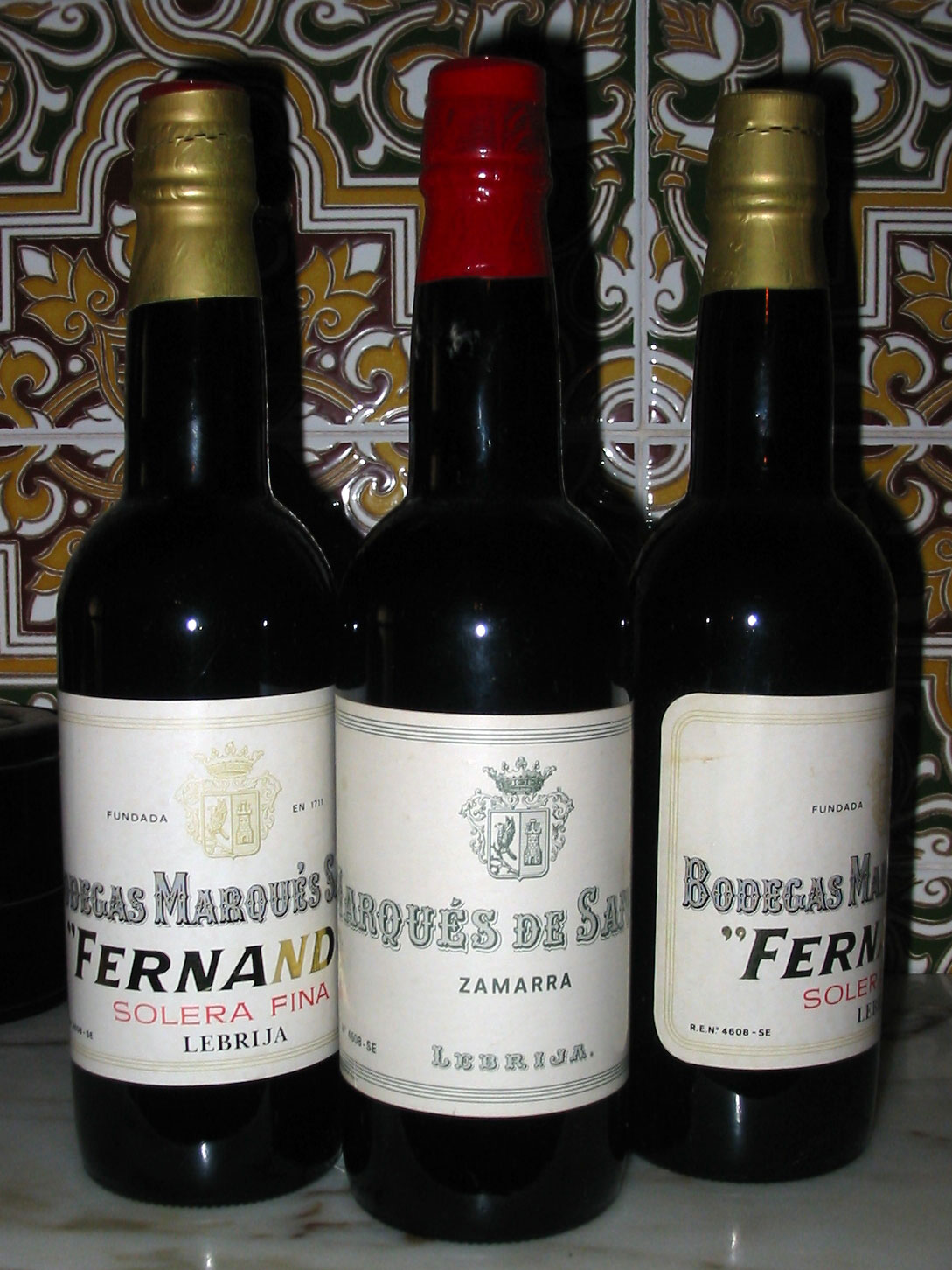
Solera Fina and Zamarra varieties of Fino, from Lebrija

- Jerez Fino is made from grapes grown in the vineyards around Jerez and aged in the wine cellars there, where the climate is hotter than those near the coast. The hotter summers cause Jerez Fino to develop a thinner layer of flor and thus a stronger flavour due to more exposure to the air.
- Puerto Fino is made around El Puerto de Santa María. The cooler climate near the sea results in a thicker layer of flor and a more acidic and delicate flavour than Jerez Fino.
- Manzanilla is made around Sanlúcar de Barrameda, where the climate is cooler than El Puerto de Santa María. Similar to the Puerto Fino, Manzanilla has a fresher and more delicate flavour than Jerez Fino.

Fino may also be produced in Denominación de origen Montilla-Moriles. There the Fino along with the other sweet and fortified wines is made from the Pedro Ximénez grape as opposed to the Palomino grape used in Jerez.

Sweetened Fino is called Pale Cream Sherry.

On 12 April 2012, the rules applicable to the sweet and fortified Denominations of Origen Montilla-Moriles and Jerez-Xérès-Sherry were changed.

The classification by sweetness is:

Fortified Wine Type	Alcohol % ABV	Sugar content (grams per litre)
Fino	15–17	0–5
Manzanilla	15–17	0–5
Pale Cream	15.5–22	45–115

== Production ==
In the production of finos, winemakers normally will only use the free run juice; the juice that is produced by crushing the grapes under their own weight before they are sent to a wine press. The juice that comes after pressing is typically more coarse and produces heavier bodied wines. That juice is typically used to make oloroso sherry.

The barrels for sherries made using the fino method are only partially filled to allow the action of the flor yeast to give it the distinctive fresh taste of dry sherries. If the flor is allowed to die and the wine undergoes oxidative aging, the wine darkens and the flavour becomes stronger, resulting in an amontillado sherry.

In the final classification of a fino, it is judged on such qualities as cleanness, paleness, dryness, and aroma. According to the overseer's judgment, the initial stroke mark on the cask may then be embellished with one or more 'palm leaves'--curved marks that branch off the side of the initial mark. Wines receiving these marks are designated accordingly "una palma", "dos palmas", "tres palmas", with each additional palm leaf indicating a higher standard of quality.

== Storing ==
Fino is the most delicate form of sherry and should be drunk within a year of bottling, although some argue that fino should not be older than six months. Once opened it will immediately begin to deteriorate and should be drunk in one sitting for the best results. If necessary it can be stored, corked, and refrigerated, for up to one week after opening.

Since sherry is not vintage dated, it can be hard to tell when the Fino was bottled. While the bottling date is printed on the label, it is in an encoded form. On the back label will be a small dot matrix number that starts with the letter L. After the L will be either a four or five-digit number. For the four-digit number, such as 7005, the first number is the year, and the last three numbers are numbers between 1 and 365 that indicate the day of the year. So this Fino was bottled on 5 January 2007. The five-digit code is similar, such as 00507, where the Julian date precedes the year. This was also bottled on 5 January 2007.

== Serving ==
As with other particularly dry sherries, it is best served chilled at 7–10 °C before a meal, and in Spain is almost always drunk with tapas of some form, such as olives, almonds, or seafood.
