= Flor =

Film of yeast on the surface of wine

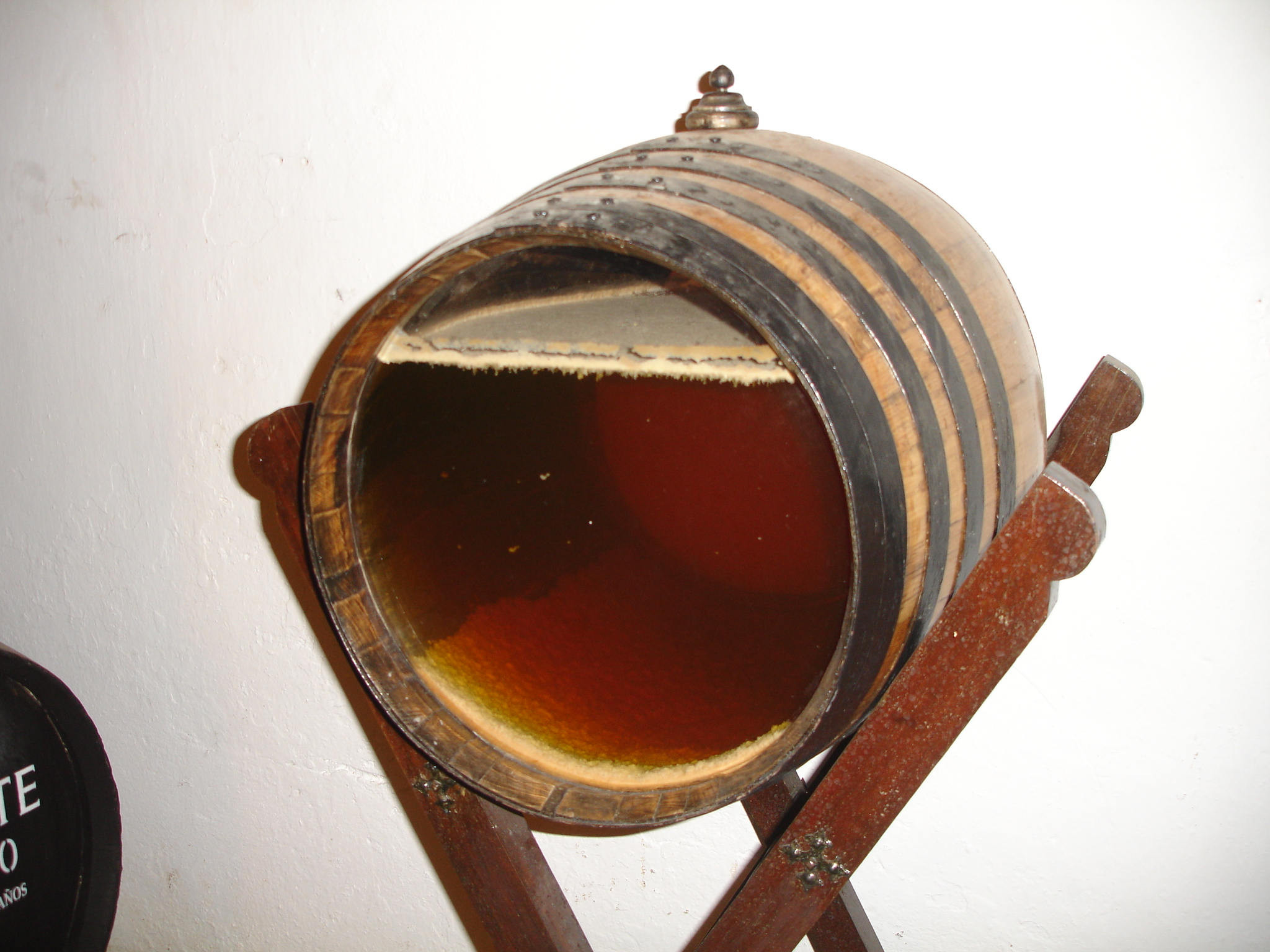
Sherry barrel with transparent front so visitors can see the development of flor

Flor (Spanish and Portuguese for flower) in winemaking, is a film of yeast on the surface of wine, important in the manufacture of some styles of sherry. The flor is formed naturally under certain winemaking conditions, from indigenous yeasts found in the region of Andalucía in southern Spain. Normally in winemaking, it is essential to keep young wines away from exposure to air by sealing them in airtight barrels, to avoid contamination by bacteria and yeasts that tend to spoil it. However, in the manufacture of sherries, the slightly porous oak barrels are deliberately filled only about five-sixths full with the young wine, leaving "the space of two fists" empty to allow the flor yeast to take form and the bung is not completely sealed. The flor favors cooler climates and higher humidity, so the sherries produced in the coastal Sanlúcar de Barrameda and El Puerto de Santa María have a thicker cap of flor than those produced inland in Jerez. The yeast gives the resulting sherry its distinctive fresh taste, with residual flavors of fresh bread. Depending on the development of the wine, it may be aged entirely under the veil of flor to produce a fino or manzanilla sherry, or it may be fortified to limit the growth of flor and undergo oxidative aging to produce an amontillado or oloroso sherry.

During the fermentation phase of sherry production, the flor yeast works anaerobically, converting sugar into ethanol. When all the sugar has been consumed, the physiology of the yeast changes to where it begins an aerobic process of breaking down and converting the acids into other compounds such as acetaldehyde. A waxy coating appears on the cells' exterior, causing the yeast to float to the surface and form a protective "blanket" thick enough to shield the wine from oxygen. This process drastically lowers the acidity of the wine and makes sherry one of the most aldehydic wines in the world. Studies have shown that for the flor to thrive, the wine must stay in a narrow alcohol range of 14.5% to 16% ABV. Below 14.5% the yeast will not form its protective cap, and so the wine will oxidize to the point of becoming vinegar. Above 16% the flor cannot survive, and so the wine essentially becomes an oloroso.

== Other regions ==
A film of yeast similar to flor is also used in the production of vin jaune in the Jura wine region in eastern France. The French term used for this yeast film is voile, meaning "veil".

A similar yeast to flor is used in the production of Szamorodni szaraz in the Tokaj wine region in northeastern Hungary and southeastern Slovakia. The Hungarian name for this yeast is hártya which means film.

Natural yeast film was traditionally used in Gose beer to seal bottles, instead of caps or corks.

Flor is also present in Vernaccia di Oristano D.O.C. a wine from the italian region of Sardinia and Malvasia di Bosa.

== See also ==
- Yeast in winemaking
