= Castle of San Marcos =

Castle of San Marcos may refer to:

- Castle of San Marcos: Spanish fort in St. Augustine, Florida, United States;
- Castle of San Marcos: medieval castle in El Puerto de Santa María, Cádiz, Spain.
