= José Cordero =

José Cordero may refer to:

- José F. Cordero, Puerto Rican doctor
- José Luis Cordero (footballer) (born 1987), Costa Rican footballer
- José Luis Cordero (actor) (born 1948), Mexican actor, singer and director
- Lince Dorado (born José Cordero 1987), Puerto Rican professional wrestler

== See also ==
- José García Cordero (born 1951), Dominican artist in Paris
- José Villegas Cordero (1844–1921), Spanish painter
- Joseph Cordero (1718–1797), Spanish clockmaker
- José Luis Cordeiro Futurist
