= List of mayors of El Puerto de Santa María =

This is a list of mayors (alcaldes) of El Puerto de Santa María.

== Mayors of El Puerto de Santa María ==
- Francisco Gil de Partearroyo y Martinez de la Arena
- Francisco Puente y Jiménez
- José L. de la Cuesta y Aldaz
- Joaquín Ruiz y López
- José María Heredia y Ferrer
- Joaquín Ruiz López
- Manuel Ruiz-Calderón y Paz
- José María Heredia y Ferrer
- Luis Portillo de Pineda
- Manuel Ruiz-Calderón y Paz
- Ramón Varela Campos
- Manuel Ruiz-Calderón Paz
- Ernesto S. Piury Dagnino
- Antonio Gutiérrez Gómez
- Manuel Ruiz-Calderón y Paz
- Luis Portillo de Pineda
- Sebastián Péndola y Soto
- Alfonso Sancho y Mateos
- José L. de la Cuesta Aldaz
- Eduardo Ruiz Golluri
- Francisco Cossi Ochoa
- Francisco Tomeu Navarro
- Francisco Cossi Ochoa
- Francisco Tomeu Navarro
- José Luis Macías Caro
- Ramón García Llano
- Francisco Veneroni Arcos
- José Blandino Mitjes
- Manuel Fernández Moro
- Fernando Ristori
- Ramón Iribarren Jiménez
- Ángel Guinea de León Garavito
- Francisco Quijano Rosende
- Antonio Rives Bret
- Manuel Barba Ordóñez
- José María Pastor Moreno
- Fernando C. de Terry y del Cuvillo
- Ignacio Osborne Vázquez
- Joaquín Calero Cuenca
- Eduardo Ciria Pérez
- Luis Caballero Noguera
- Miguel Castro Merello
- Luis Portillo Ruiz
- Juan Melgarejo Osborne
- Fernando T. de Terry Galarza
- Manuel Martínez Alfonso
- Francisco Javier Merello Gaztelu
- Enrique Pedregal Valenzuela
- Antonio Álvarez Herrera
- Rafael Gómez Ojeda
- Juan Manuel Torres Ramírez
- Hernán Díaz Cortés
- Fernando Gago García
- Enrique Moresco García
