= Priory Church, El Puerto de Santa María =

Great Priory Church
- Iglesia Mayor Prioral (Spanish)
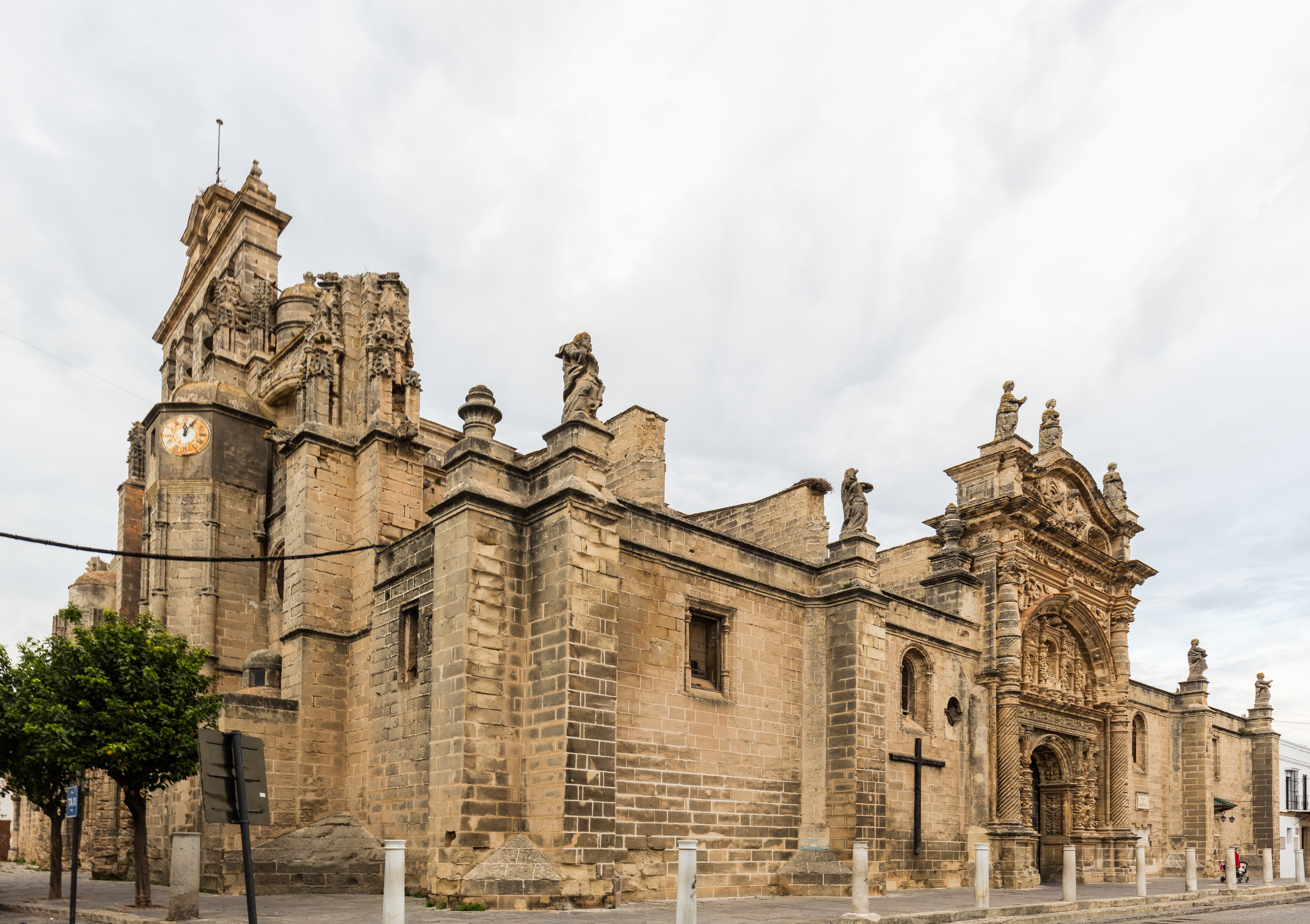
- Plateresque sculpture adorns the church's south entrance which is known as the "Puerta del Sol"

- Location within Spain
- 36°35′59.36″N 6°13′43.96″W
- Location: El Puerto de Santa María, Cádiz, Spain

Spanish Cultural Heritage
- Official name: Iglesia Mayor Prioral
- Type: Non-movable
- Criteria: Monument
- Designated: 1982-11-12
- Reference no.: (R.I.) - 51 - 0004729 - 00000

The Priory Church (Spanish: Iglesia Mayor Prioral) is a minor basilica church in El Puerto de Santa María, province of Cádiz, Spain. It is documented from 1486 when the building was under construction. It was damaged by an earthquake in the 17th century and was partly rebuilt in the Baroque style. As a result of being constructed in two phases, the church contains both Gothic and Baroque architecture, exemplified in its portals.

It was declared Bien de Interés Cultural (a category in the Spanish heritage register) in 1982.

== Location ==
The church is situated on one side of Plaza España, opposite the Municipal Museum. The local name of the square is therefore, Plaza de la Iglesia (literally Church Square). It was situated in this area of the town to avoid being affected by flooding by the Guadalete River.

== History ==
The original Priory Church in El Puerto de Santa Maria was founded in the 13th century, but the current Church was constructed in the late fifteenth century. The beginning of construction work is referenced in documents dating to 1486, and the church first opened for public worship in 1493. The date of completion is not known, although the beginning of construction work is referenced in documents dating to 1486. Alonso Rodríguez is documented as one of the architects. It was built using sandstone from the Sierra de San Cristóbal, a mountain nearby in Cádiz. Sandstone from the same location was also used for pillars in Seville Cathedral.

Additions were subsequently made to the structure. The first chapel alongside the nave of the Epistle was built in 1517 by Juan de Lucena. This chapel was bought by Benito Benavides and his wife in 1533, to be used for their burials.

In 1636, the church was damaged in an earthquake that affected El Puerto de Santa María.

=== Present day ===
The church is open for both public worship and for tourists.

== Architecture ==
=== Exterior ===
The church was built in a Gothic style, although it has baroque and Plateresque elements, as the original structure has been expanded and altered since its construction.

The church has doorways from different periods. One of the entrances, known as the "Door of Forgiveness", is constructed in the Gothic style and dates from the original construction. The doorway currently used as the main entrance is the "Sun Portal" (Puerto del Sol), which gives access from the Plaza España to the nave of the Epistle.

The Puerta del Sol was added to the church in the 16th century, probably between 1535 and 1544, and is attributed to Martin Gaínza, an architect who also worked on Seville Cathedral. Its original construction was finances by Don Juan de la Cerda, the Duke of Medina at the time. Additions were made in the 17th century, when rebuilding work was carried out following the earthquake. There is a series of sculptures depicting the Christian virtues of faith, hope and charity. The niches between the lower columns contain small sculptures depicting the Church Fathers.

=== Interior ===
The church's interior, which displays a number of different styles due to restoration work during its history, has several important architectural features and works of art. This includes two altarpieces, one cast in silver by Jose Medina in 1682, which is currently located in the Chapel of the Shrine, and another in the Chapel of Our Lady of Miracles, which was created in the 16th century by a member of the Pedro Duque y Cornejo school.

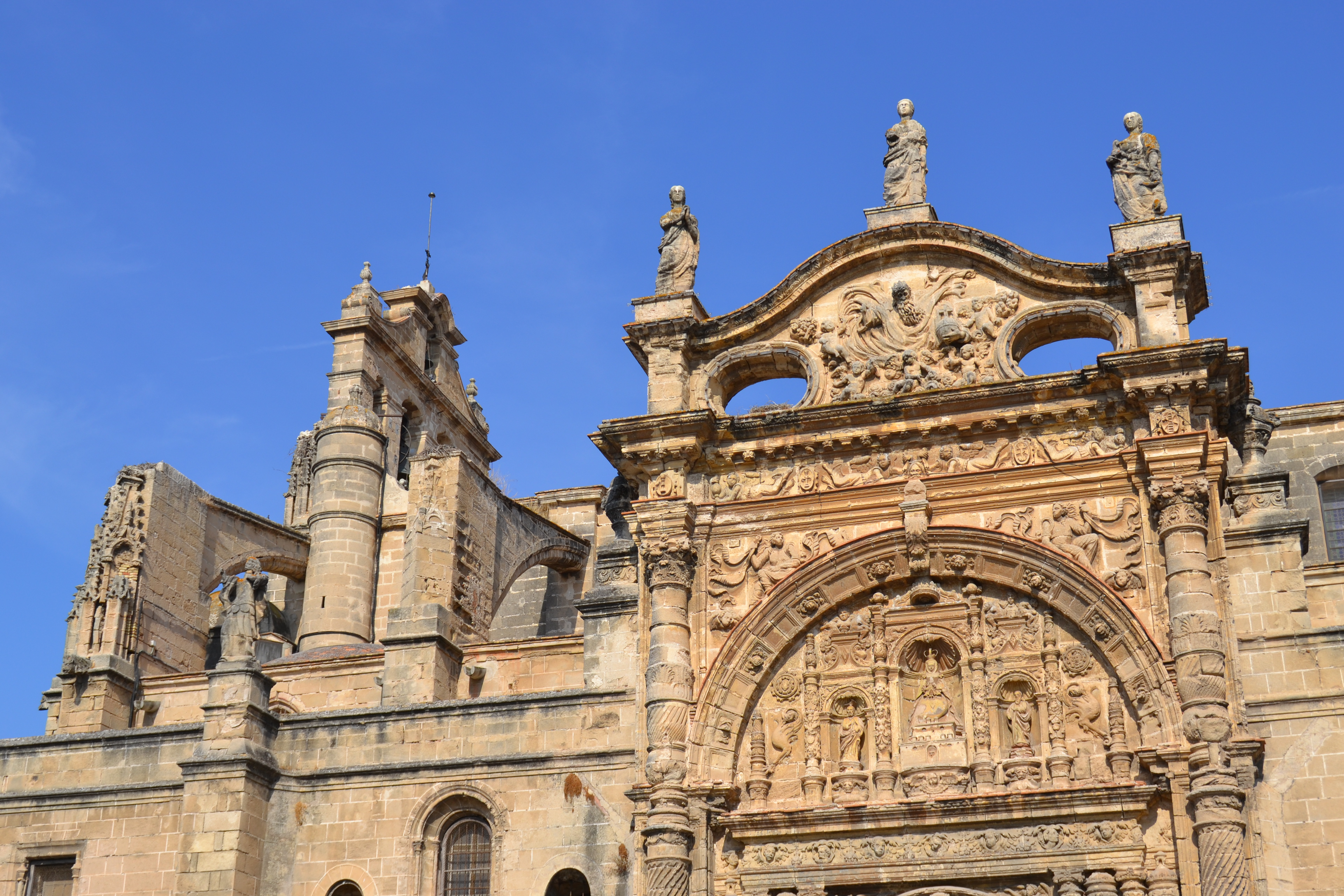

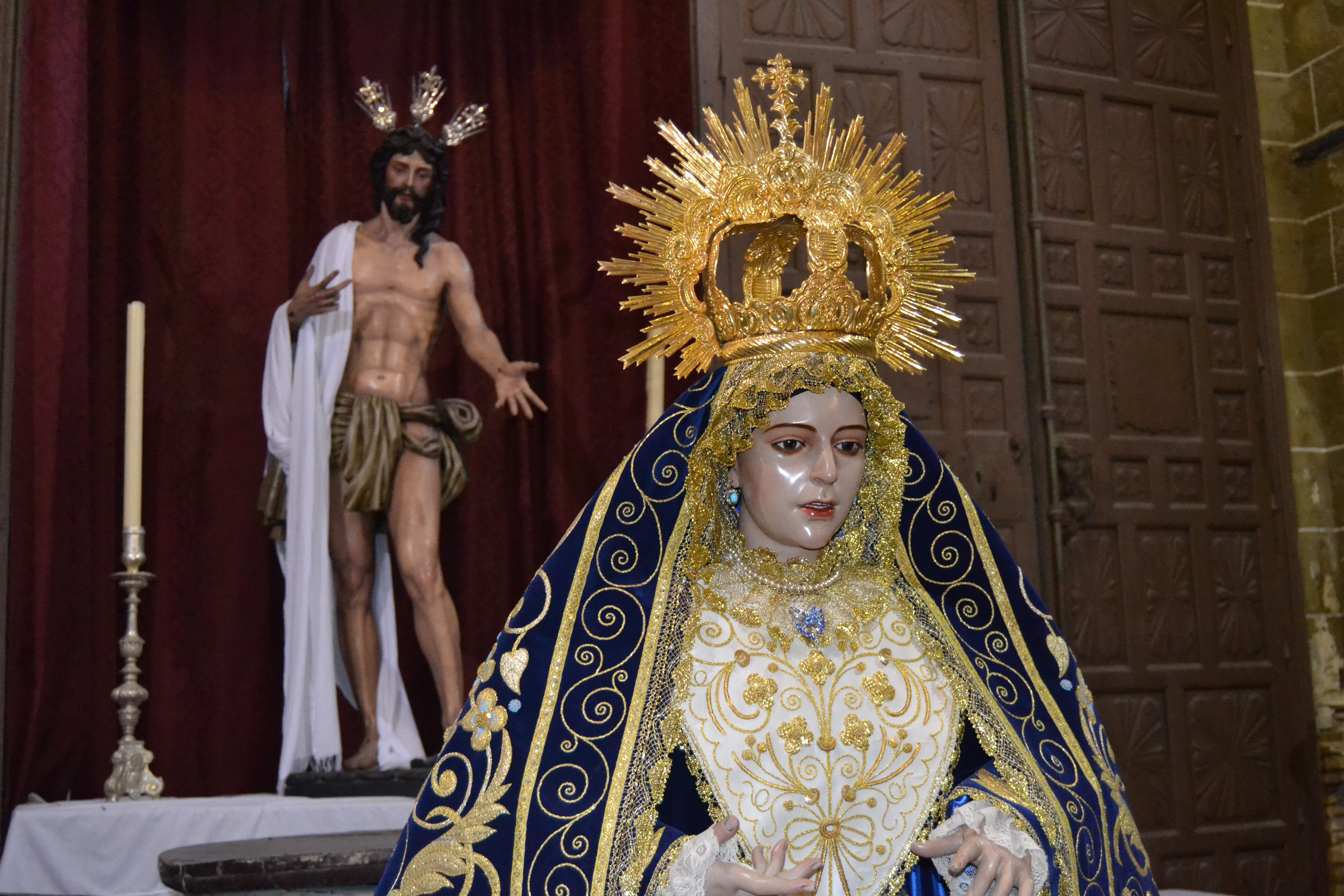

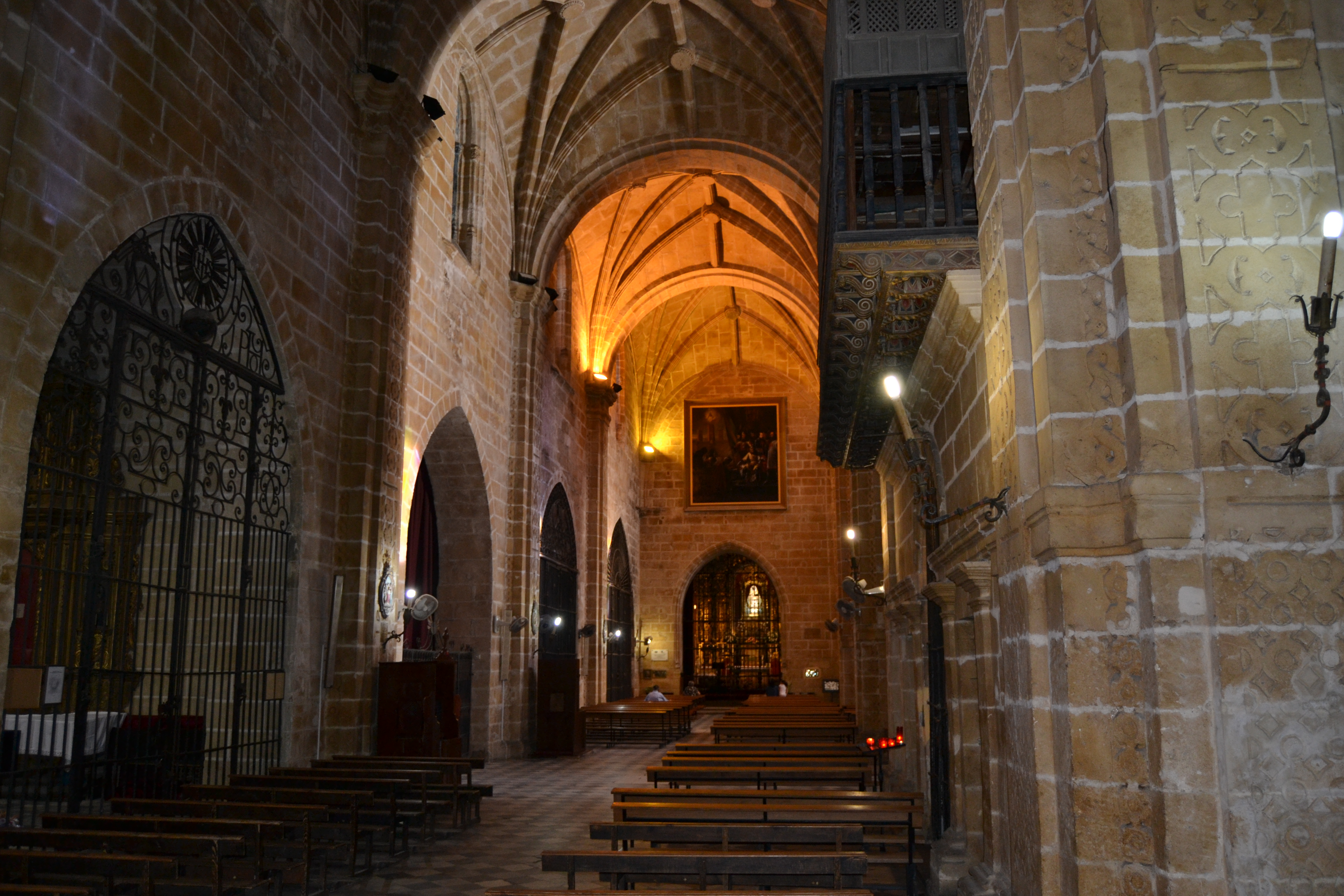

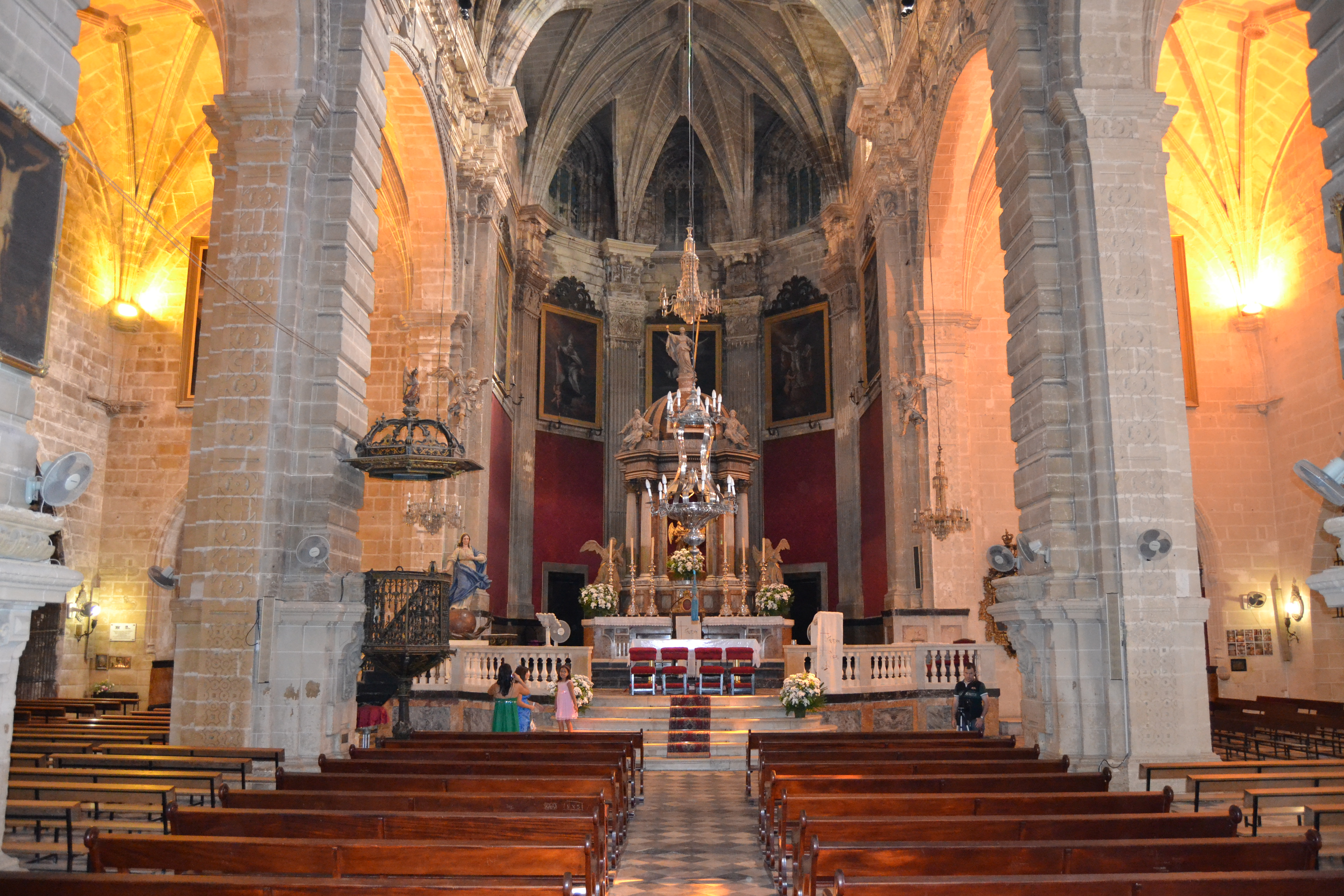

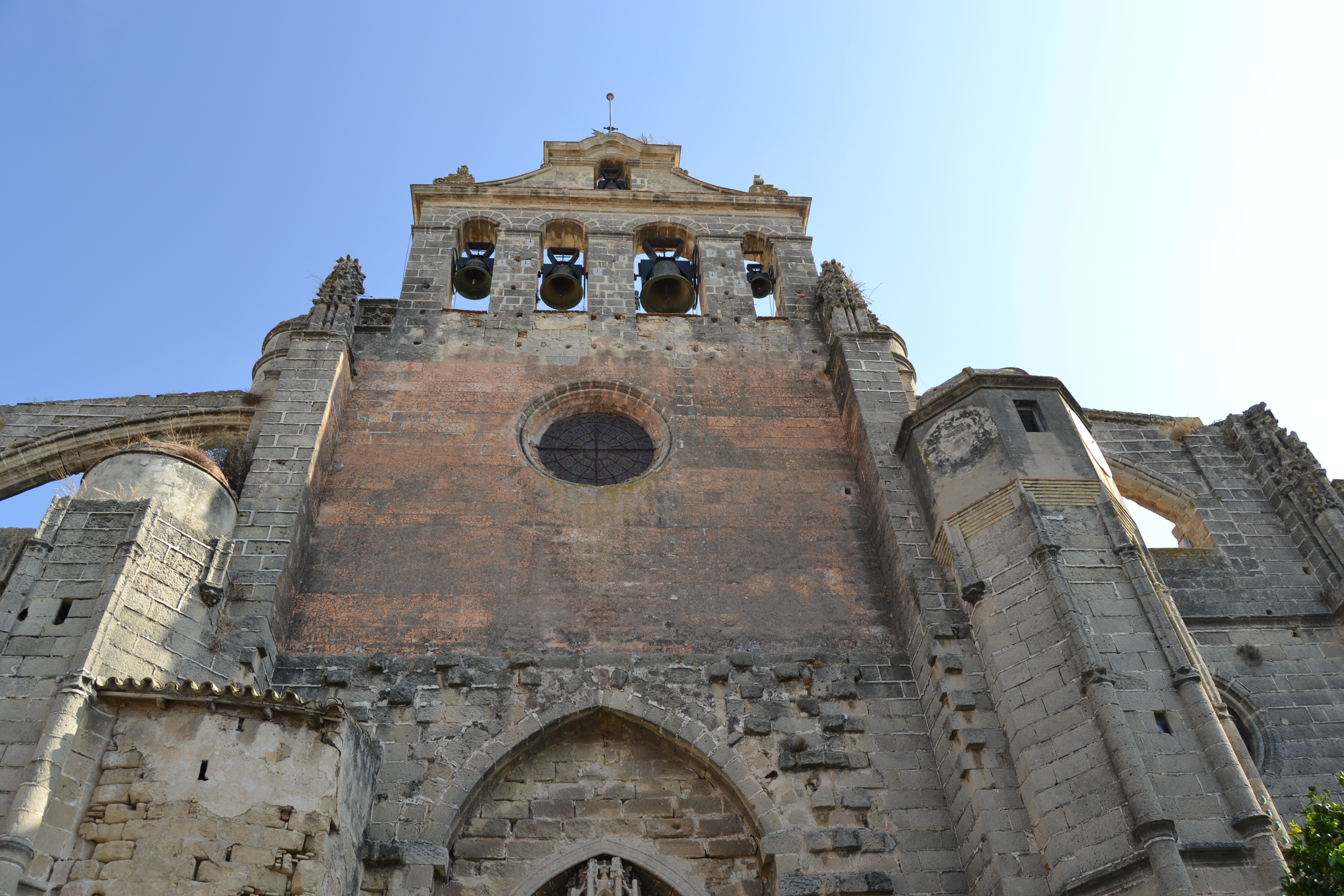

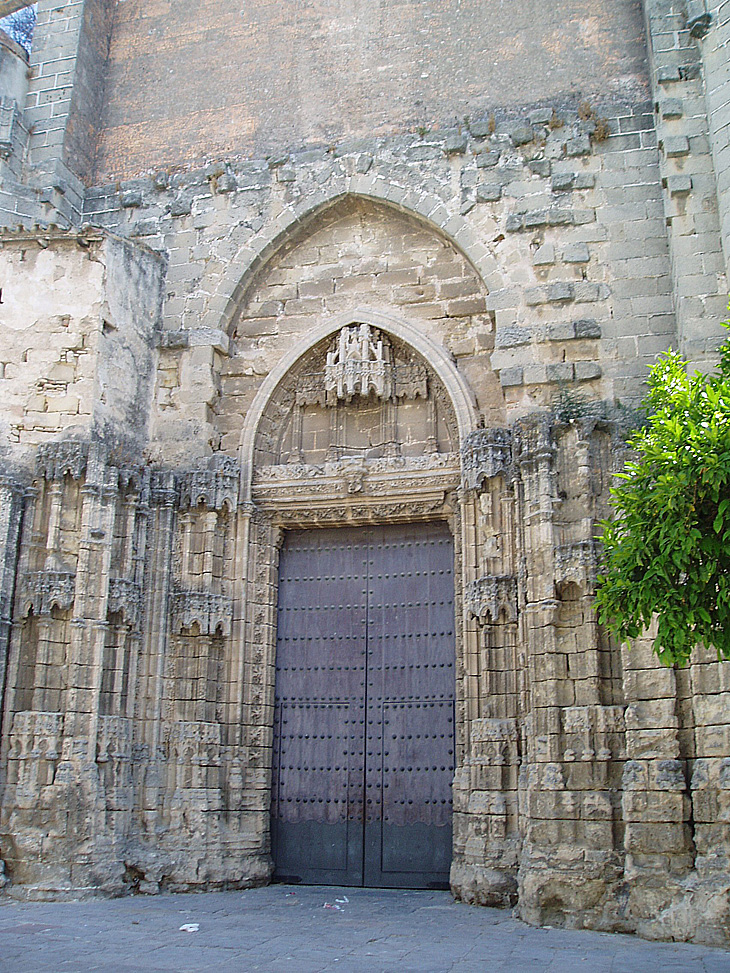
Gothic Portal

== See also ==
- List of Bienes de Interés Cultural in Cádiz
