= Plaza de toros de El Puerto =

Bullring in El Puerto de Santa María, Spain

Coordinates: 36°35′49″N 6°13′58″W

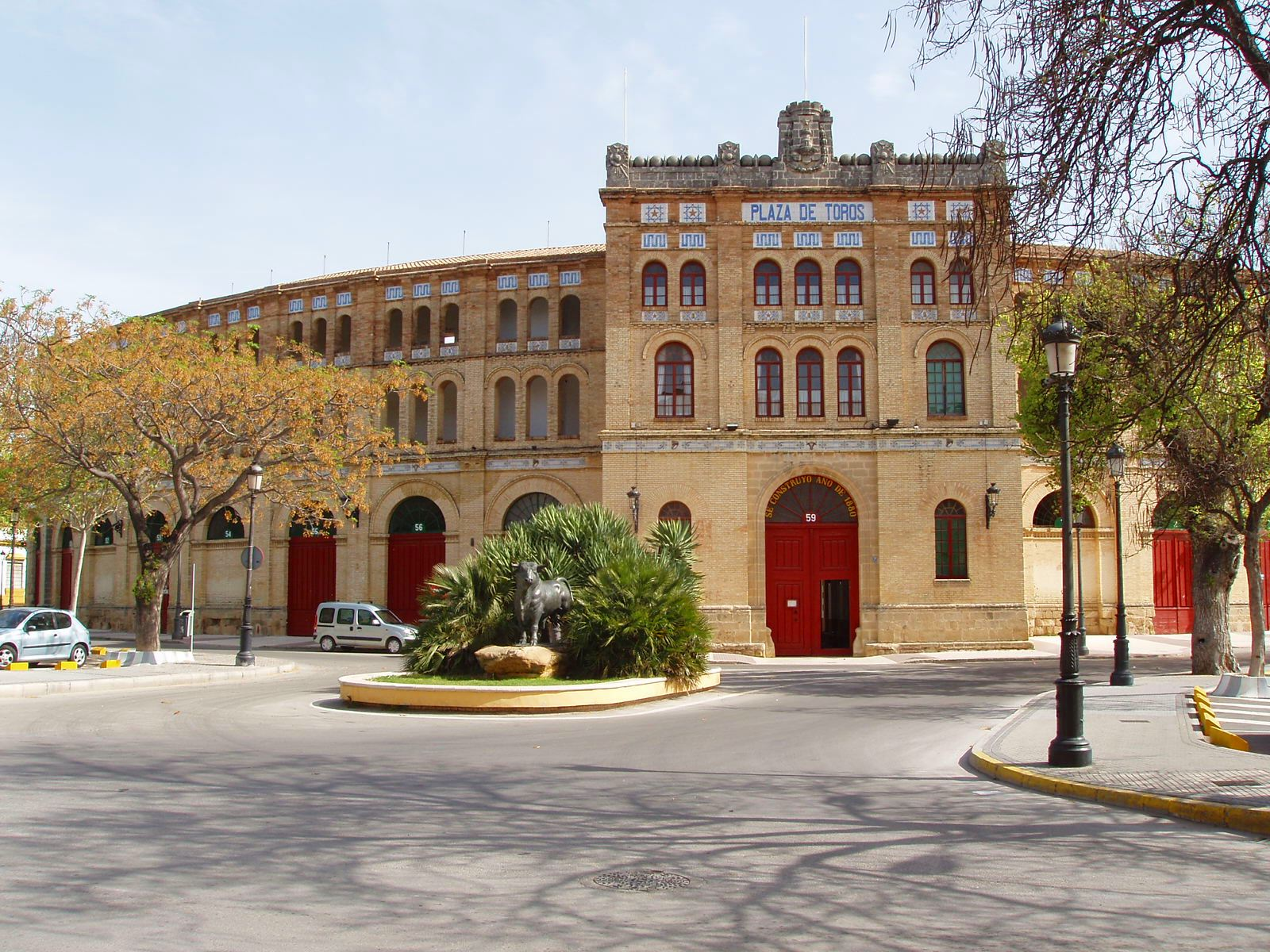
Main entrance to the Plaza de Toros de El Puerto

The Real Plaza de Toros de El Puerto de Santa María is a bullring in El Puerto de Santa María, Spain.

Dating from the 19th century, it has an eclectic architectural style and was completed in 1880. It is the work of Manuel Portillo de Avila y Herrera. The arena is 99 metres in diameter and the central ruedo measures 60 m. It is estimated to hold 12,186 spectators, making it one of the largest rings in Spain behind Madrid's Las Ventas and the ring in Valencia.
