= Francisco Javier de Burgos y Larragoiti =

Spanish journalist and comic author (1842 – 1902)

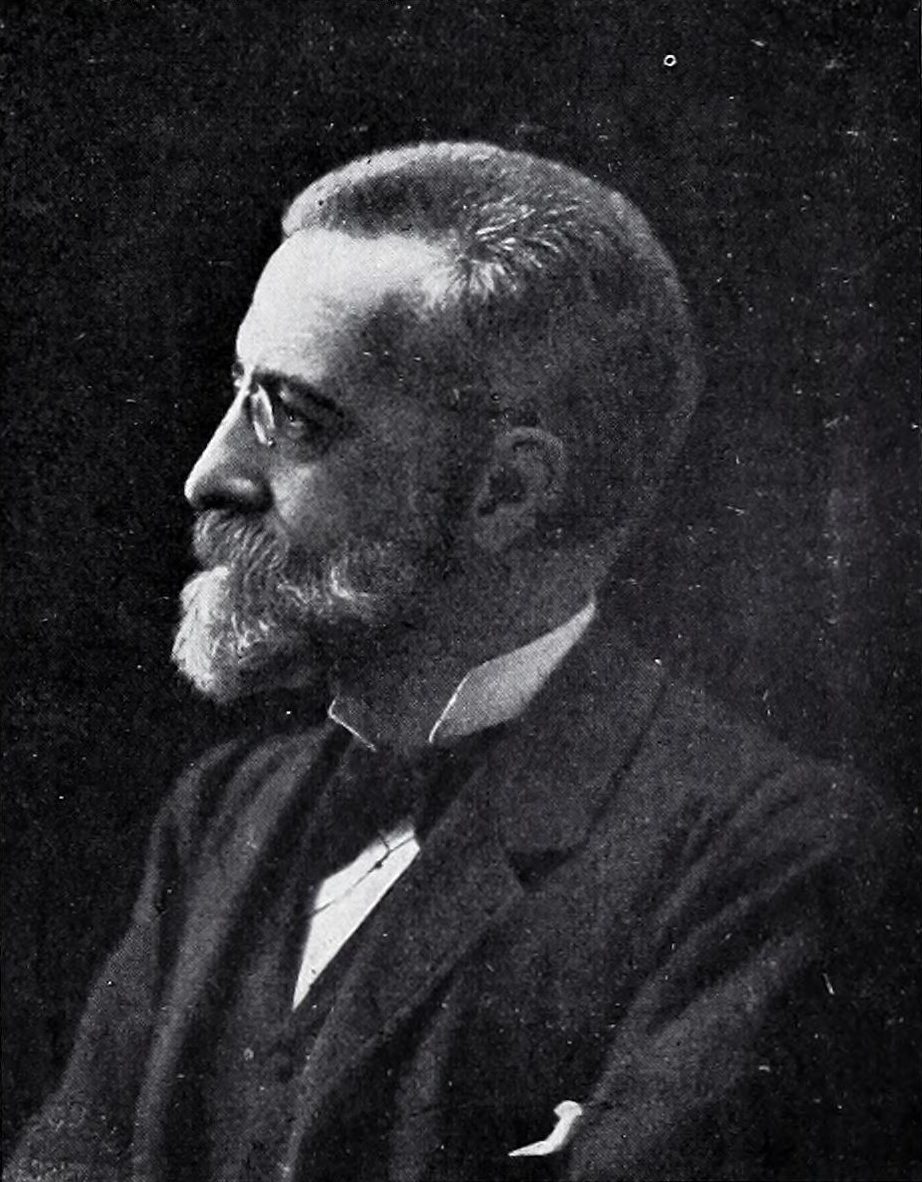
Francisco Javier de Burgos y Larragoiti

Francisco Javier de Burgos y Larragoiti (born in El Puerto de Santa María 1842 – died in Madrid 1902) was a Spanish journalist and author of comics theatre.
