= Joseph Cordero =

Spanish clockmaker

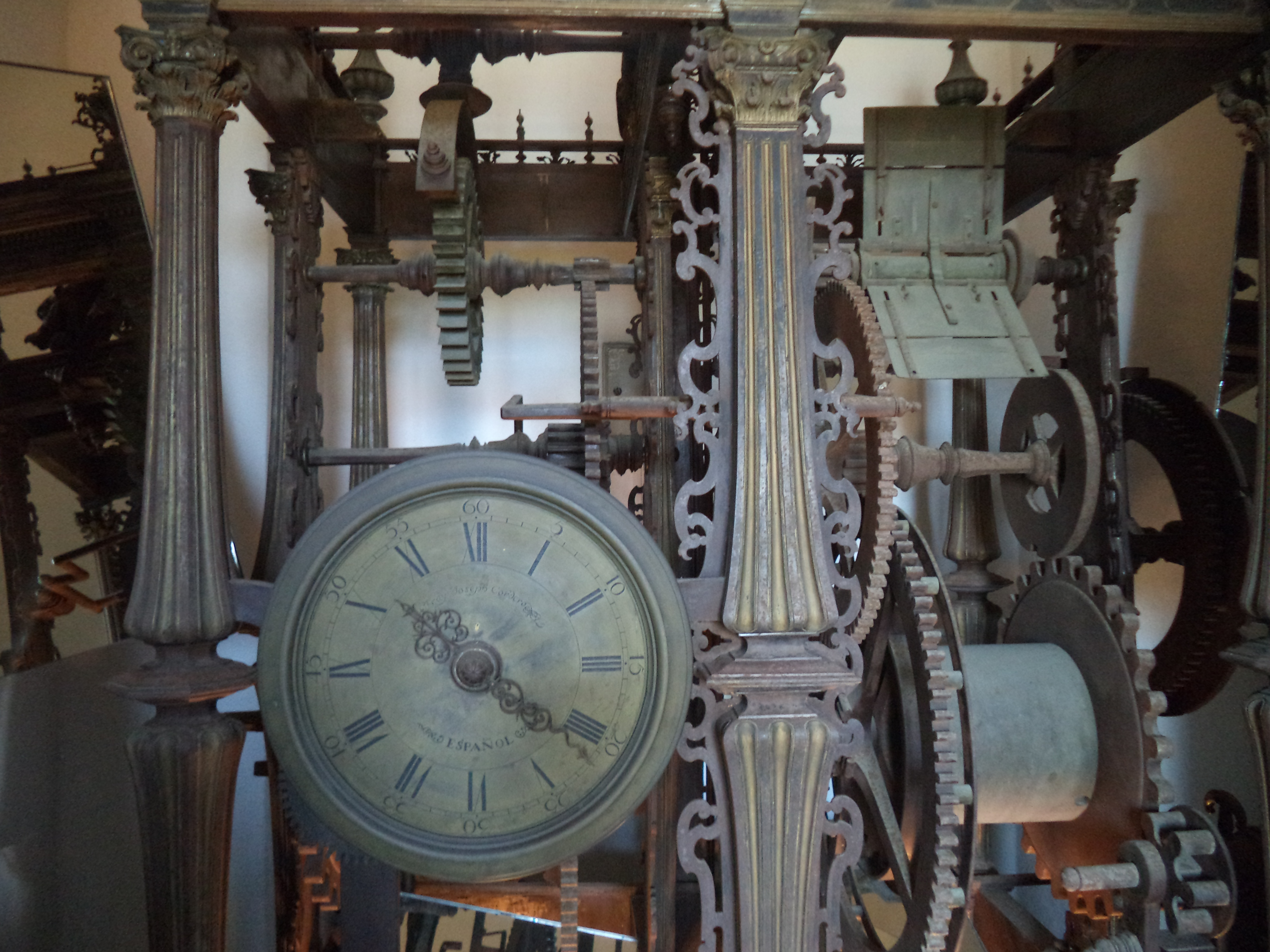
Clock of the Giralda

Joseph Cordero (born in El Puerto de Santa María in 1718 and died in 1797) was a clockmaker who built the clock tower of the Giralda in Seville. He also made the gate of the chapel of St. Peter in the Cathedral of Seville, the gate of the chancel of the Charterhouse of Jerez de la Frontera, copper boxes priory of El Puerto de Santa María, and the clock tower of the convent of San Francisco in his hometown. He was a religious layman.
