= El Puerto de Santa María =

El Puerto de Santa María Port Saint Mary
- Municipality
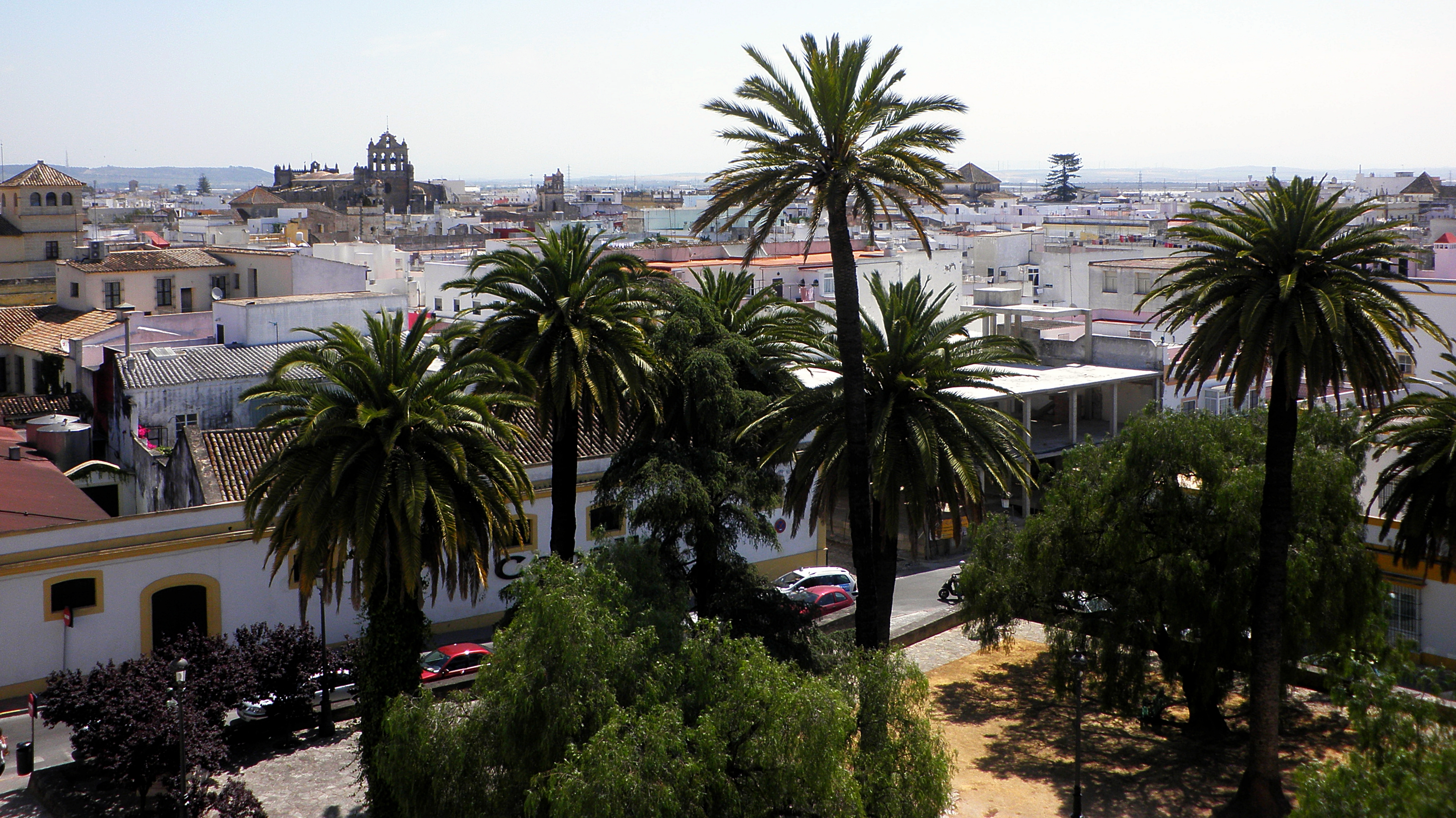

- Flag Coat of arms
- Interactive map of El Puerto de Santa María
- Coordinates: 36°36′5.29″N 6°14′17.33″W
- Country: Spain
- Autonomous Community: Andalusia
- Province: Cádiz

Government
  - Type: Ayuntamiento
  - Mayor: Germán Beardo (PP)

Area
  - Total: 159.34 km^{2} (61.52 sq mi)
- Elevation: 0 m (0 ft)

Population (2025-01-01)
  - Total: 89,983
  - Density: 564.72/km^{2} (1,462.6/sq mi)
- Demonym: Portuense
- Time zone: CET (GMT +1)
  - Summer (DST): CEST (GMT +2)
- Post code: 11500
- Area code: +34956
- Website: Official website

El Puerto de Santa María (Spanish pronunciation: [el ˈpweɾto ðe ˈsanta maˈɾi.a]), locally known as El Puerto and historically in English as Port Saint Mary, is a municipality of Spain located on the banks of the Guadalete River in the province of Cádiz, Andalusia. As of 2016, the city has a population of c. 88,184, of which some 50,000 live in the urban center, and the remainder in the surrounding areas.

The town of El Puerto de Santa María is located 10 km (6 mi) northeast of Cádiz, across the bay of Cádiz.

== Geography ==
Housing is primarily located on the right (western) bank of the Guadalete, near its discharge into the Bay of Cádiz, in the Atlantic coast of the southwestern Iberian Peninsula. The municipality nears Jerez de la Frontera, Rota, Puerto Real, and Cádiz. Parts of the municipality belong to the Bahía de Cádiz Natural Park.

== History ==
The place on which El Puerto is built is identified as a probable location for the Portus Gaditanus, a major shipping point for the exports of goods from the Baetica under Roman rule. Likewise, the Portus Gaditanus is in turn identified by some authors with the ancient Portus Menesthei. Both identifications are however not free of controversy. Whatever the case, the Portus Gaditanus was promoted by Lucius Cornelius Balbus Minor on a pre-existing pier in the hinterland of Gades at some point after the latter became a municipium civium Romanorum in the second half of the 1st century BCE in the wake of the suppression of the old regime of Punic suffetes.

From the 10th to the 12th centuries, under Islamic rule, the place hosted a small rural community (alquería) known as al-Qanatir, presumably in reference to some kind of old bridge over the Guadalete. The alqueria (which came to be renamed as Santa María del Puerto) should have been occupied by Castile towards 1255–57 in the context of the preparations for Alfonso X's 1260 African crusade in Salé. The partitioning of the territory ensued from 1264 to 1268, and the place was populated by Christian settlers, primarily Basques, Cantabrians, and Castilians, as well as some Catalans. El Puerto soon passed to control of the newly-created Order of Saint Mary of Spain. On 16 December 1281, Alfonso X granted El Puerto a chartae populationis, recognising it as realengo ('royal demesne') and styling its name as Grand Puerto de Santa María.

Throughout the late middle ages, El Puerto was one of the most importants towns of the Kingdom of Seville.

The population should not have reached more than 2,000 people in 15th century.

Christopher Columbus visited El Puerto in 1480 and received encouragement for his travel plans. He also met Juan de la Cosa, who would become his pilot during his first expedition to the Americas, which set sail from El Puerto de Santa María in 1492. Juan de la Cosa drew his world map (the first including the coast of New World) in El Puerto in 1500.

El Puerto was the residence of several wealthy cargadores, merchants who operated Spain's trade with the Americas.

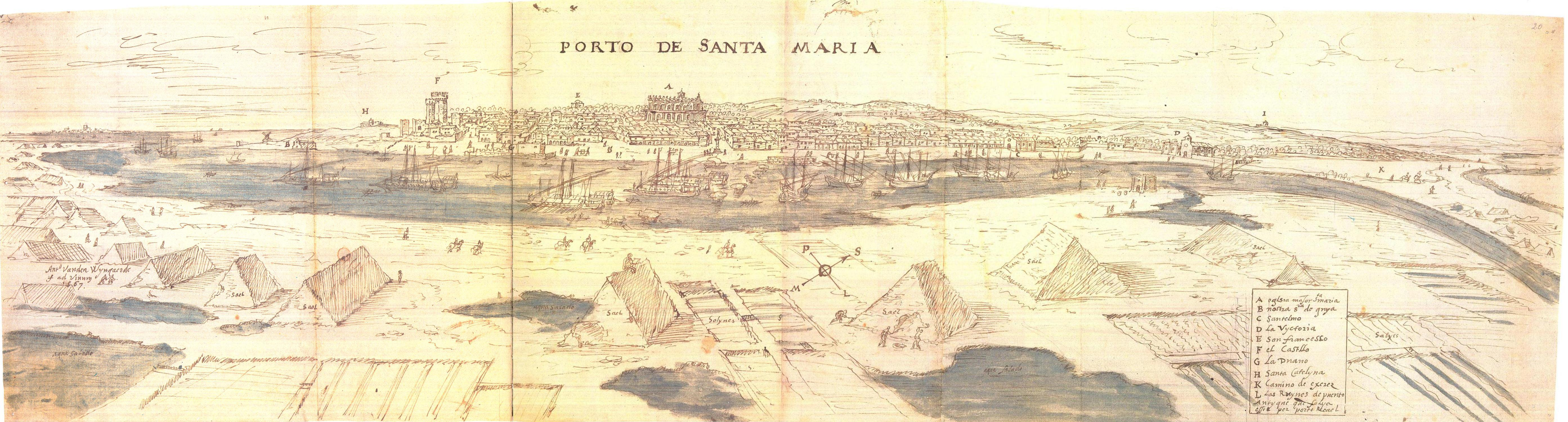
Panoramic sketch of Porto de Santa Maria by Anton van den Wyngaerde (c. 1567)

During the 16th and 17th centuries, it was the winter port of the royal galleys.

In the nineteenth century the city became the General Headquarters for the French Army during the Peninsular War under the reign of Joseph Bonaparte (1801–1812).

The town is steeped in history, museums and monuments. It is also within easy reach of the historical cities of Seville and Cádiz.

== Economy ==
The most important economic activity is tourism, mainly thanks to the local beaches, as well as the summer bullfights held at the Plaza de toros de El Puerto. The town also hosts large groups of motorcyclists during the Jerez Motorcycle Grand Prix. There is commercial development in the center and periphery, and a highly developed wine industry. El Puerto is also home to Aponiente, the first restaurant in Andalusia to receive three Michelin stars.

== Culture ==
Listed are a few of the main fiestas in the area:

- Spring Carnival: Cádiz is the home of Carnival with fancy dress and parades in the streets usually ending on the Tuesday 47 days before Easter.
- Semana Santa: Holy Week the week that leads up to Easter Sunday is a wonderful time to enjoy the area with its street parades and long lines of penitents and big crowds. In El Puerto de Santa María, there are daily parades from Palm Sunday to Easter Sunday.
- Campeonato de España (Motorbikes Races): A weekend fiesta of music and dance in April World Championships of Motorcycling.
- Feria del Vino Fino (Spring's fair): El Puerto de Santa María's local week of fiesta, dancing sherry drinking and sevillana dancing this is usually in the middle of May. This is the principal festival is the Feria de Primavera (Spring Fair), held between the fifth and sixth week after Holy Week. In recent years, it has coincided with May 1.
- Romería del Rocio: Festive pilgrimage of up to one million people to the village of Rocio in Almonte, Huelva, usually around the third week of May.
- Hogueras de San Juan: Midsummer bonfires and fireworks on the beaches in most areas of Cádiz on 23 June.
- Dia de la Virgen del Carmen: One of the most popular Saint of El Puerto de Santa María and all fishermen is the Virgen Del Carmen, and on the 16th of July, her image (statue) is taken from the local Church, carried into the sea on board a fishing boat, and then paraded around the town. A general day of festivities.
- Virgen de los Milagros: The saint of the city is La Virgen de los Milagros (Virgin of the Miracles). The festivity is on September the 8th. Her image is taken from the principal church and carried to the street, and then paraded around the town over a carpet of flowers. It is a local day of festivities.

== Main sights ==
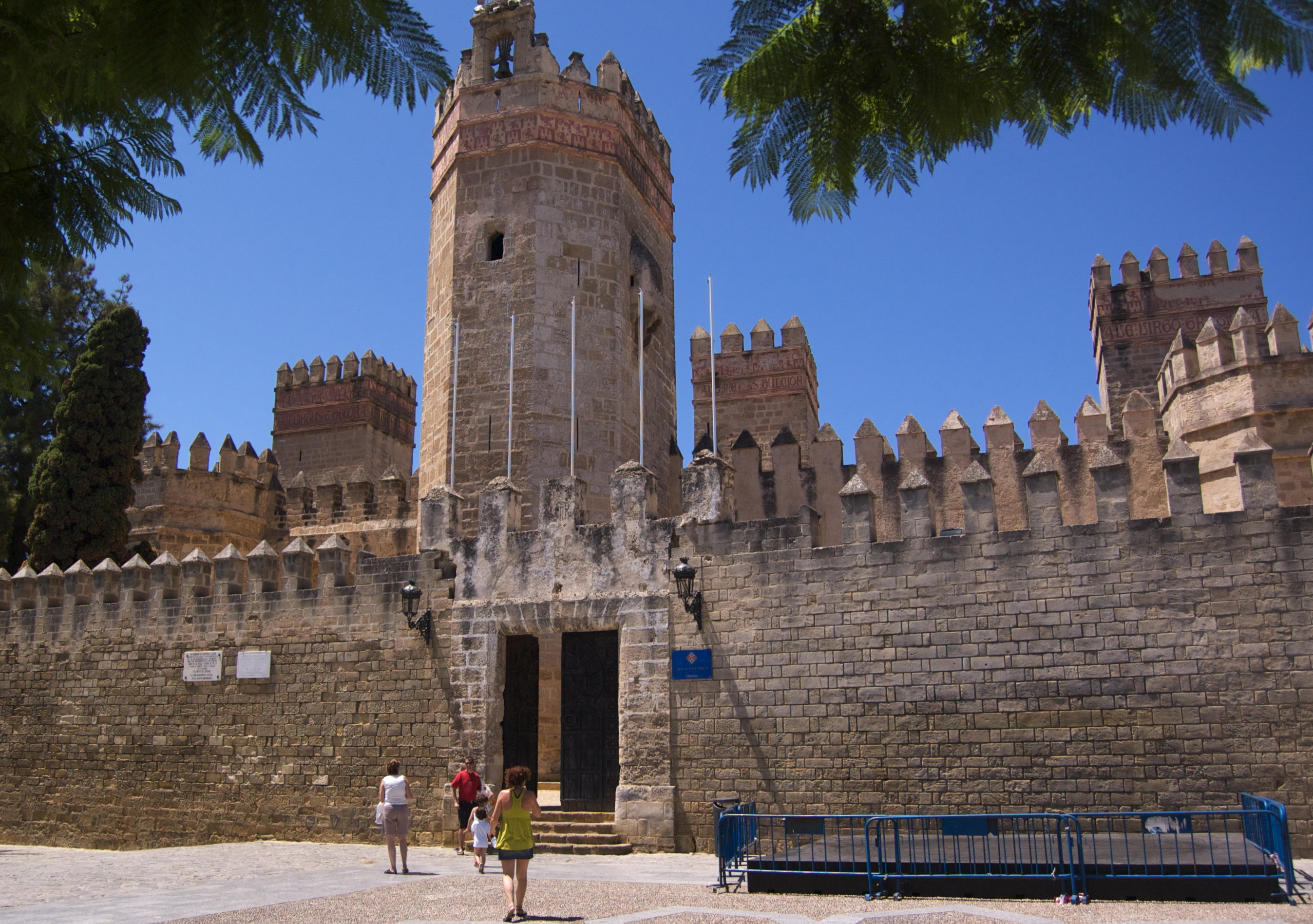
San Marcos Castle

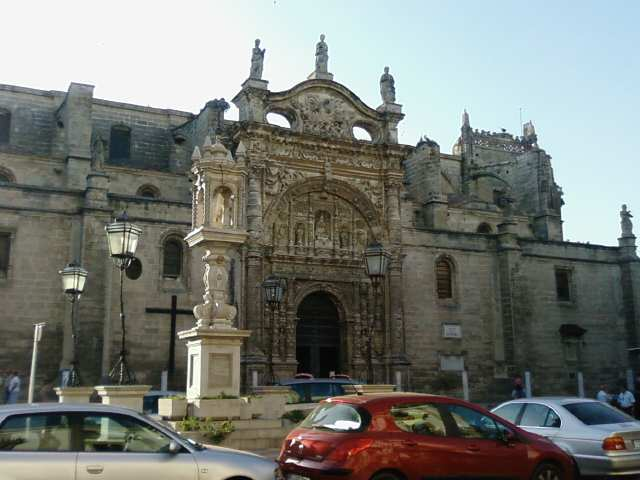
Iglesia Prioral

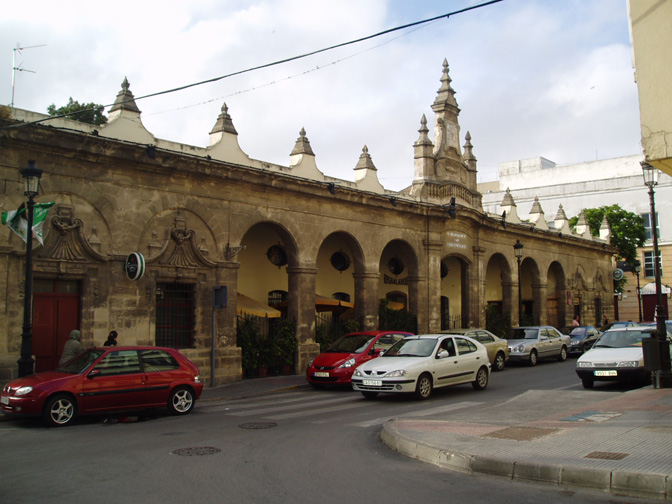
Antigua Lonja

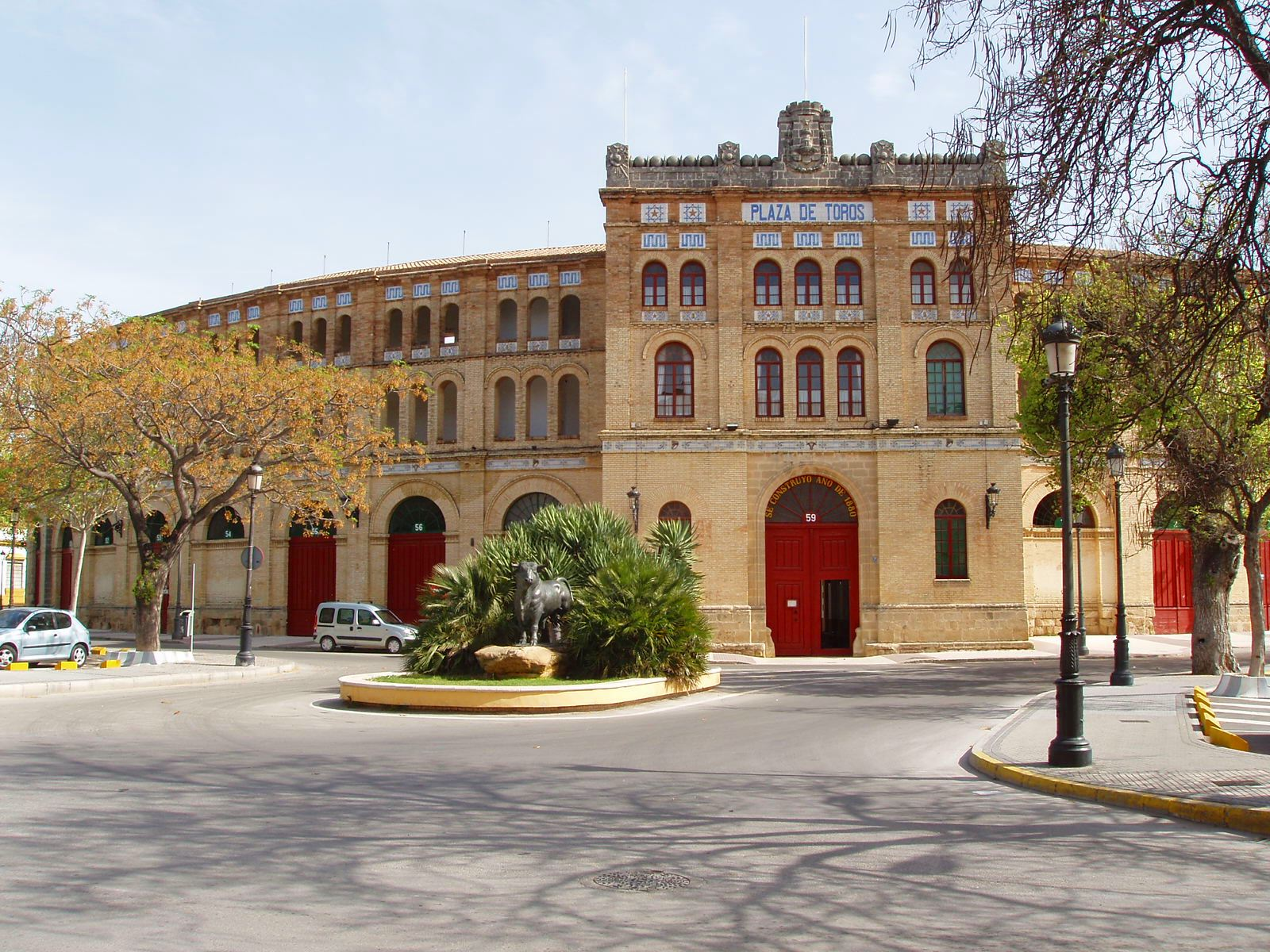
Bull ring

- Bullring of El Puerto, which dates back to 1880 with space for 15,000 spectators.
- Iglesia Mayor Prioral, known from 1486
- Castle of San Marcos, a fortified church built over the remains of a 10th-century Islamic mosque. It was built by order of Alfonso X of Castile from 1364, also using parts of an ancient Roman edifice nearby.
- Monastery of the Victory (early 16th century), built by the Dukes of Medinaceli
- Hermitage of Santa Clara (16th-18th century)
- Convent of the Holy Spirit (15th century)
- Church of San Francisco (next to San Luis Gonzaga building)
- Church of San Joaquín
- Convent of Santo Domingo
- Hospital of San Juan de Dios
- Convent of Esclavas del Sagrado Corazón de Jesús
- Convent of La Concepción
- Chapel of Aurora
- Monastery of San Miguel
- Hospital of Divina Providencia (Hospitalito)
- Palace of Aranibar
- Palace of Almirante Valdivieso
- Antiguo Matadero
- Palace of Imblusqueta
- Palace of Marqués de Villarreal y Purullena
- Palace of Álvarez-Cuevas
- Casa Vizarrón (Casa de las cadenas)
- Casa de los Rivas
- Antiguo Pósito
- Casa de los Diezmos
- Fountain of Galeras
- Casa de la Placilla
- Casa de Roque Aguado
- Fountain of prison
- San Luis Gonzaga building
- Antigua Aduana
- Antigua Lonja ("Ancient Loggia"), located in the port and dating to the 18th century.
- Museo Arqueológico Municipal
- Several towers

== Events ==
Bullfighting is still enjoyed during the Feria season during the month of August, and during the Feria de la Primavera (Spring Fair) in early May. This Feria is dedicated to sherry wine and 180,000 half bottles are drunk in 4 days. There are several bodegas (wineries) in the town centre, all of which can be visited by the public. The most famous bodegas in El Puerto are Osborne and Terry both of which export sherry and brandy worldwide. In the cellars of El Puerto, the dry, pale sherry known as Fino is produced using the traditional method called solera. This method produces Fino, the sweet Muscatel, Amontillado and the older Oloroso.

== International relations ==
=== Twin towns – Sister cities ===
El Puerto de Santa María is twinned with:

- Casablanca, Morocco
- Coral Gables, Florida, United States
- Texcoco, Mexico
- Brighton, United Kingdom
- Calp, Spain

== Notable people ==
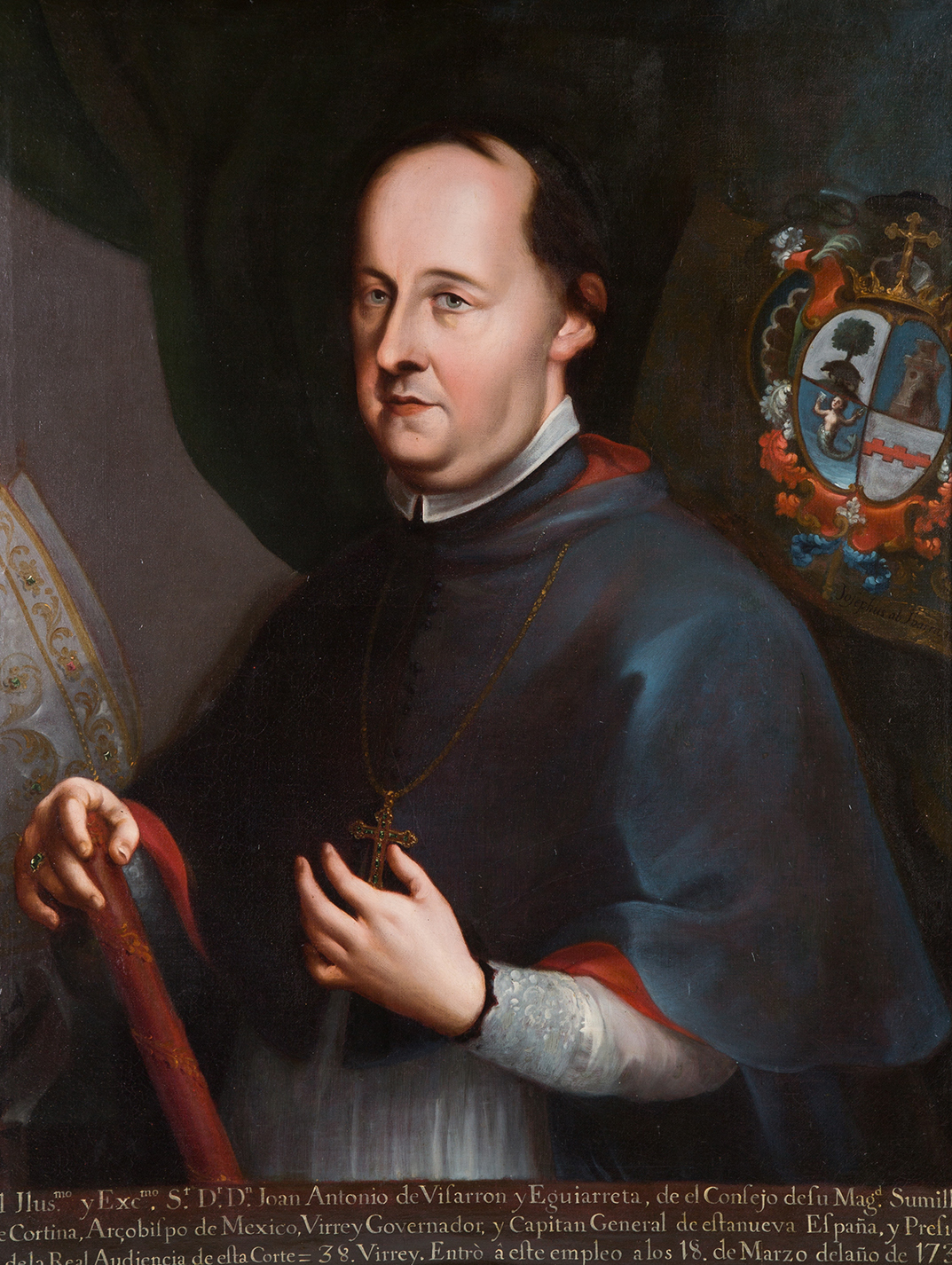
Juan Antonio de Vizarrón y Eguiarreta

- Pedro Muñoz Seca, playwright
- Rafael Alberti, poet of the Spanish Generation of 1927
- Juan Modesto, Republican general
- Valentín Galarza Morante, minister of Francisco Franco
- Pedro Pérez Fernández, playwright
- Juan Antonio de Vizarrón y Eguiarreta, viceroy and archbishop
- Torcuato Benjumeda, architect
- Francisco Javier de Burgos y Sarragoiti, journalist
- José Cordero de Torres, clockmaker
- Joaquín Sánchez Rodríguez, football player
- José Manuel Pinto, football player
- Abraham Paz, football player
- Girolamo Lagomarsini, Italian humanist
- Miguel García Granados, President of Guatemala
- Valerio Lucci, Italian humanist

== Gallery ==
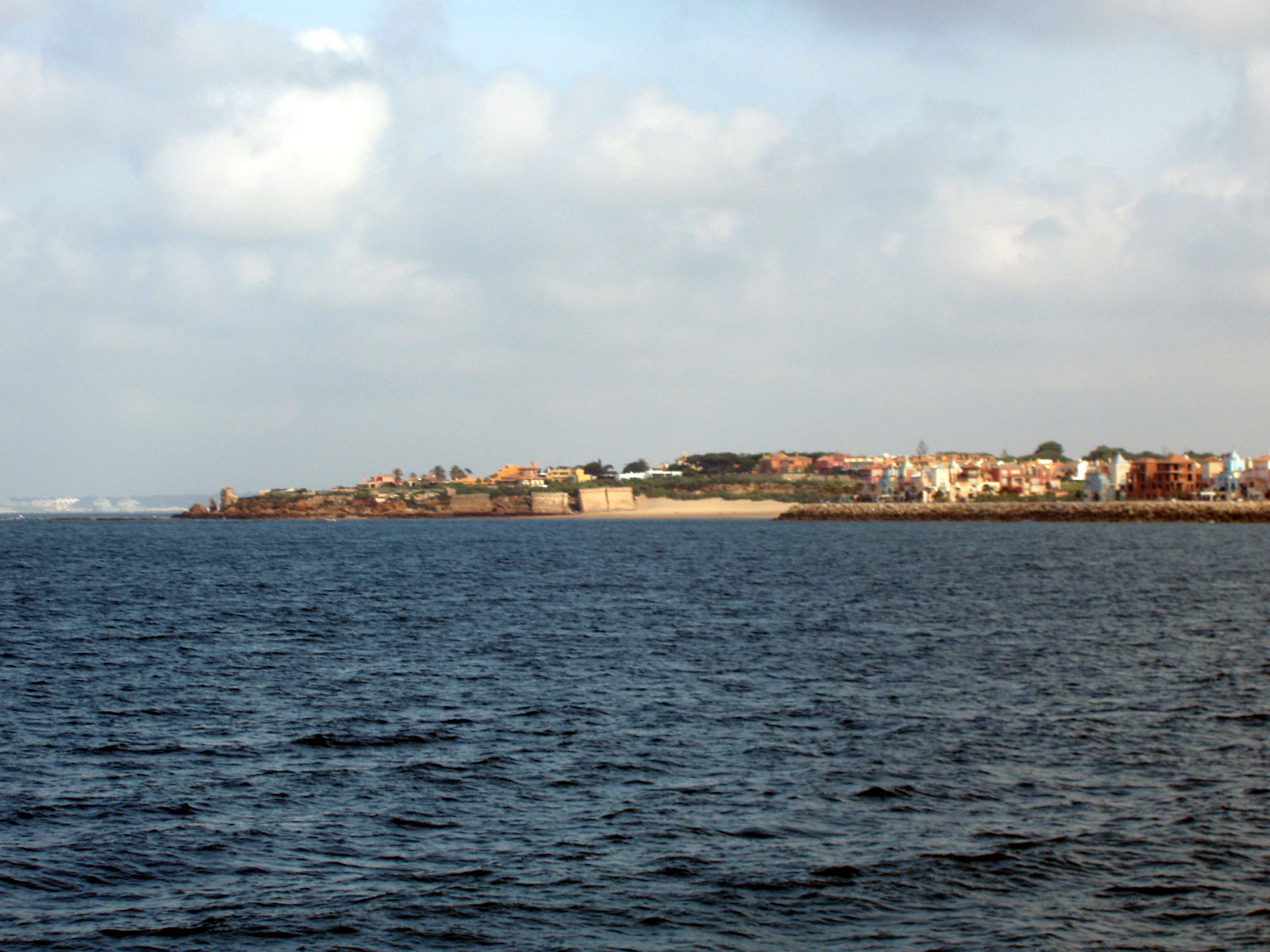
"La Muralla" beach from the sea

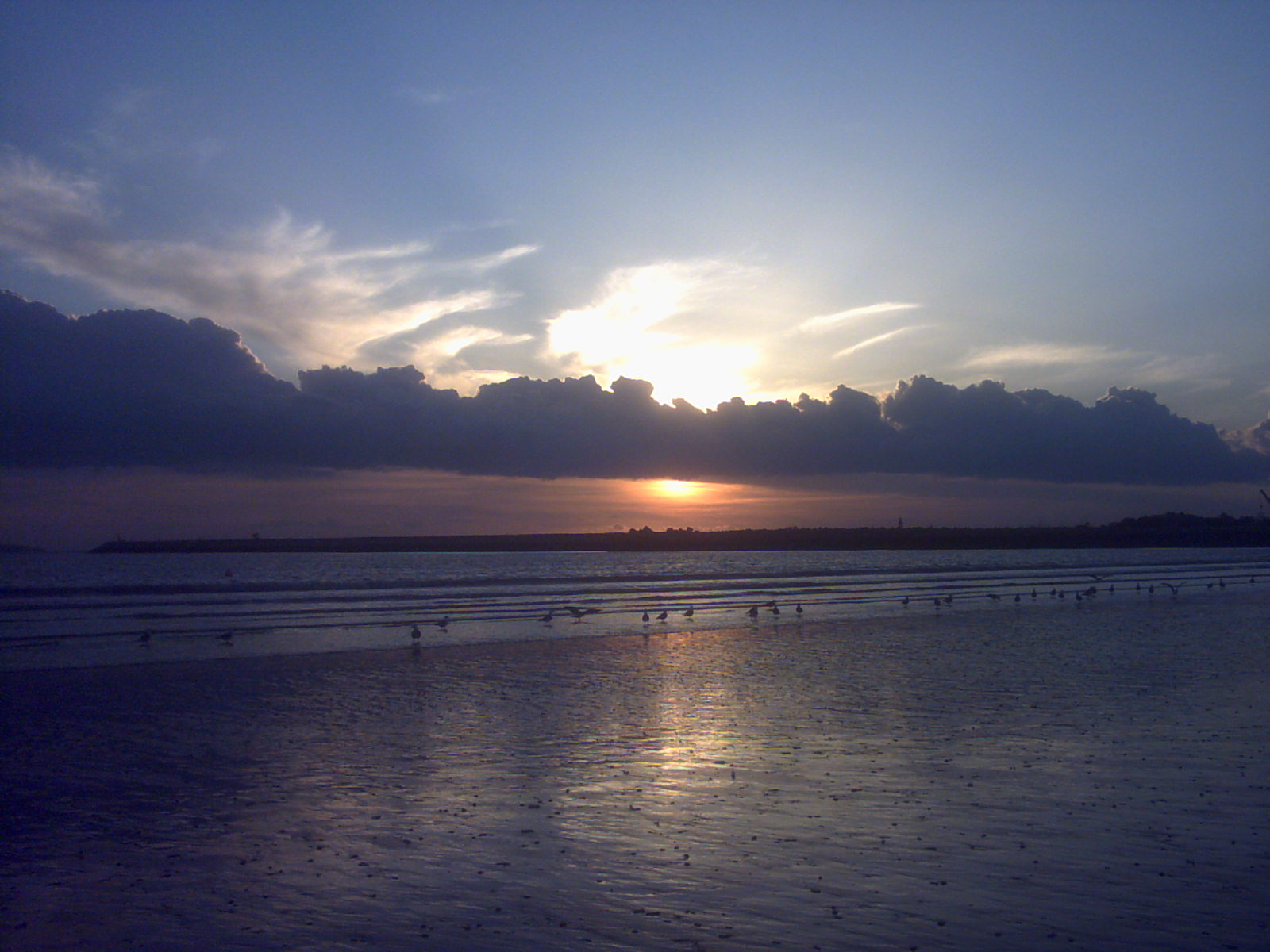
Sunset in Valdelagrana

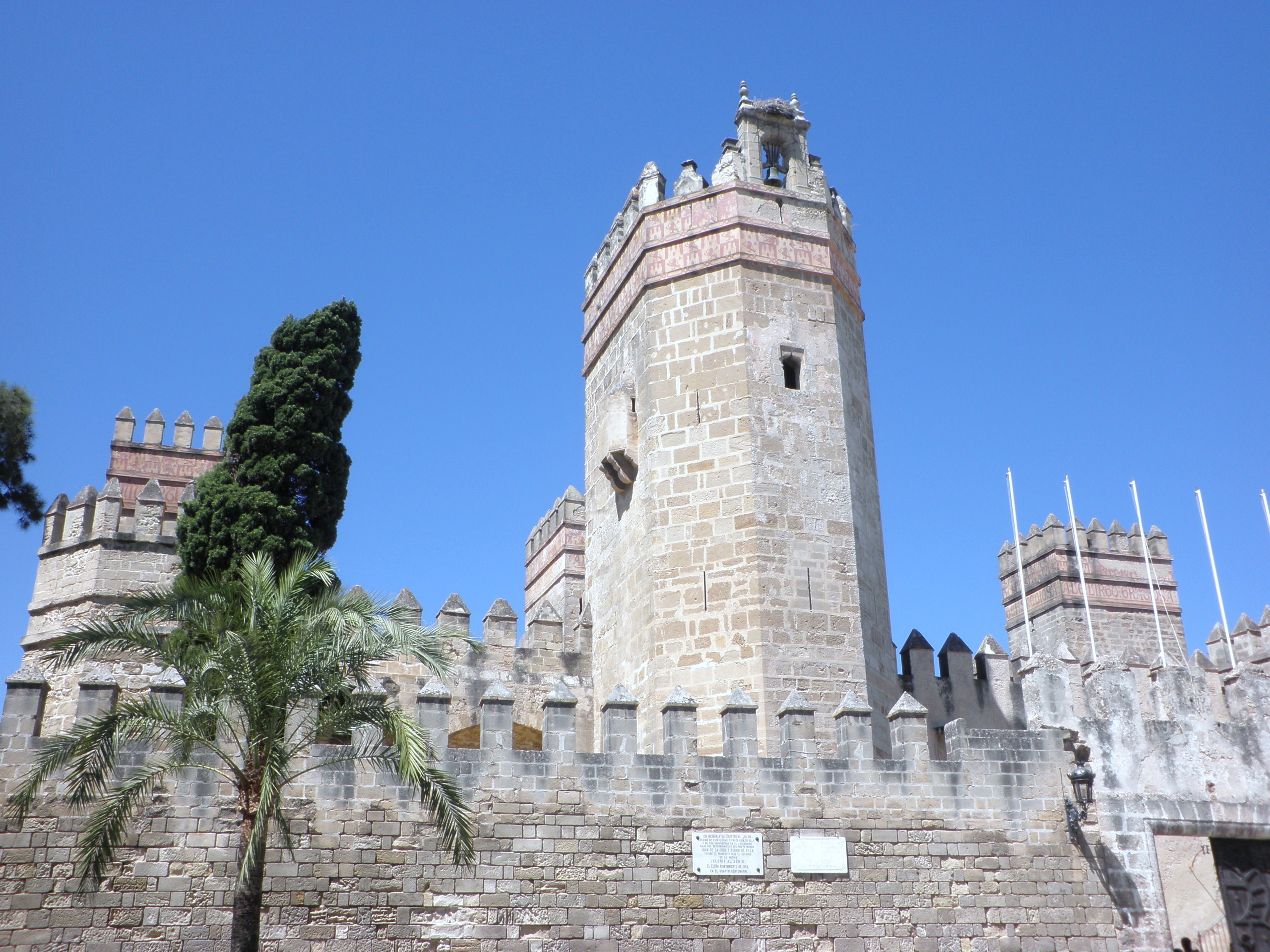
San Marcos Castle

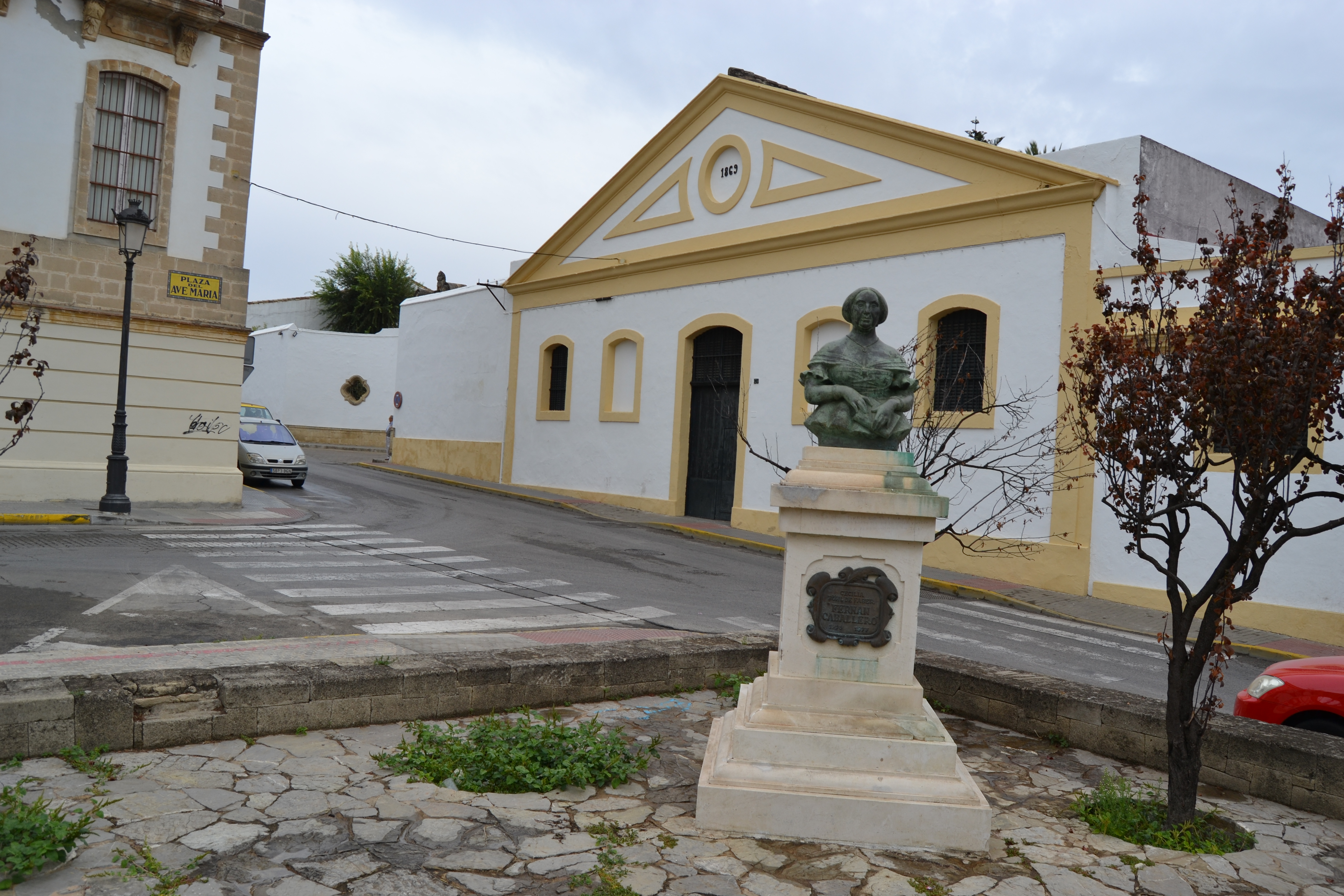
Ave María Square

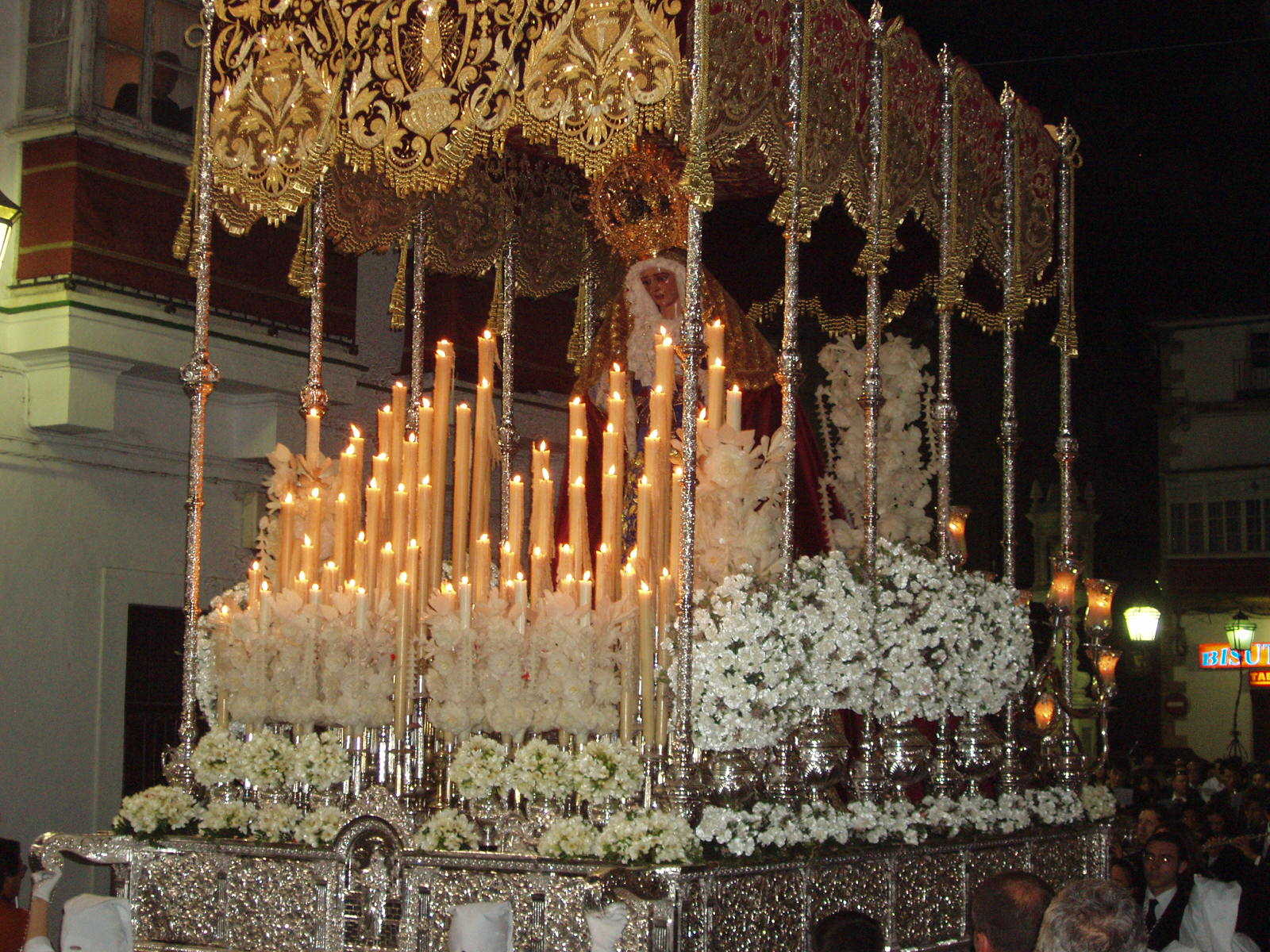
Our Lady of Bitterness (Nuestra Señora de la Amargura)

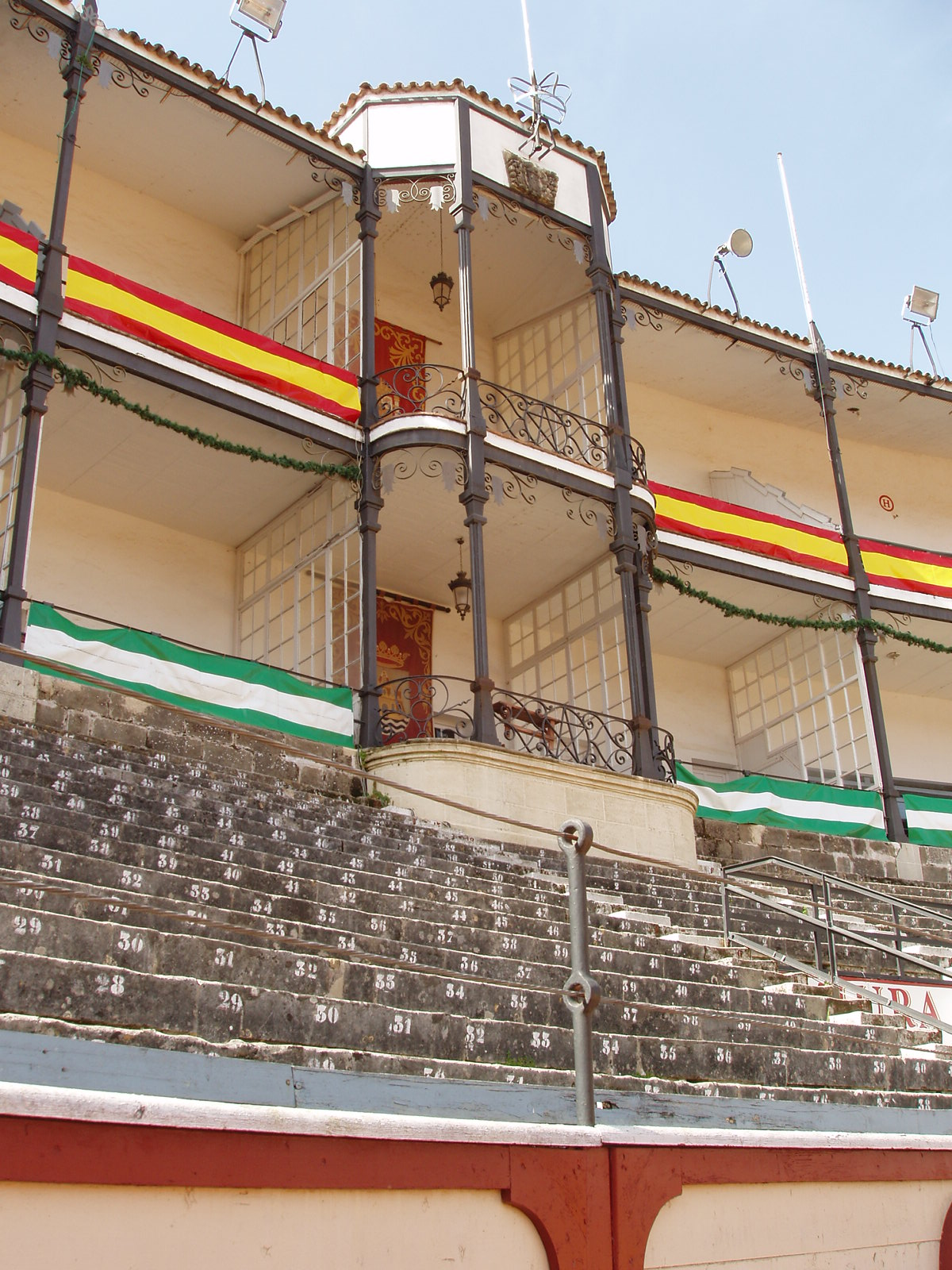
Bull ring

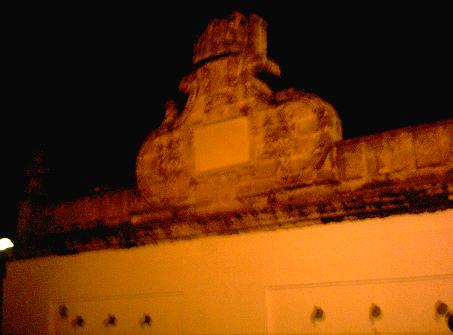
Galeras fountain

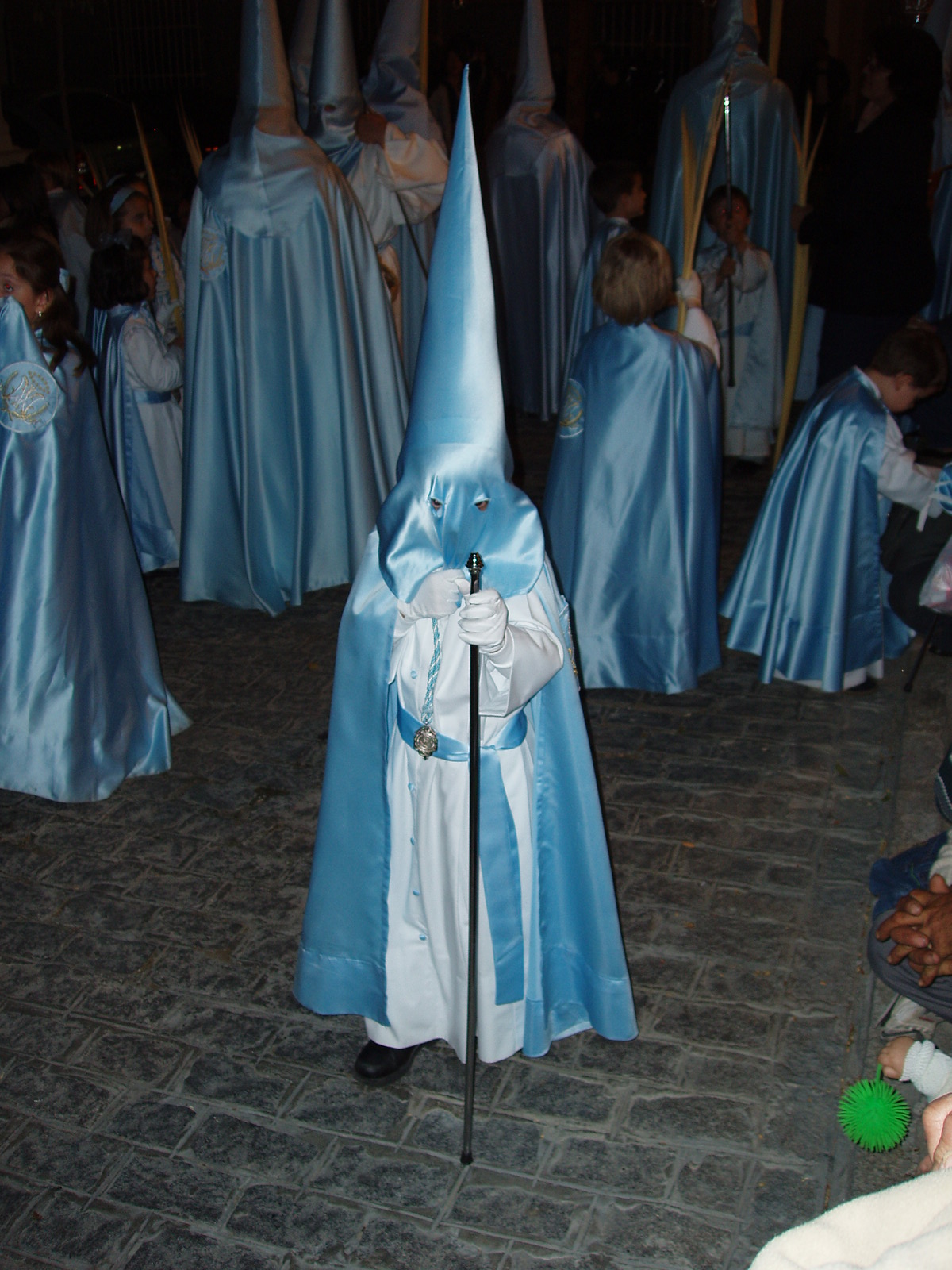
Penitente

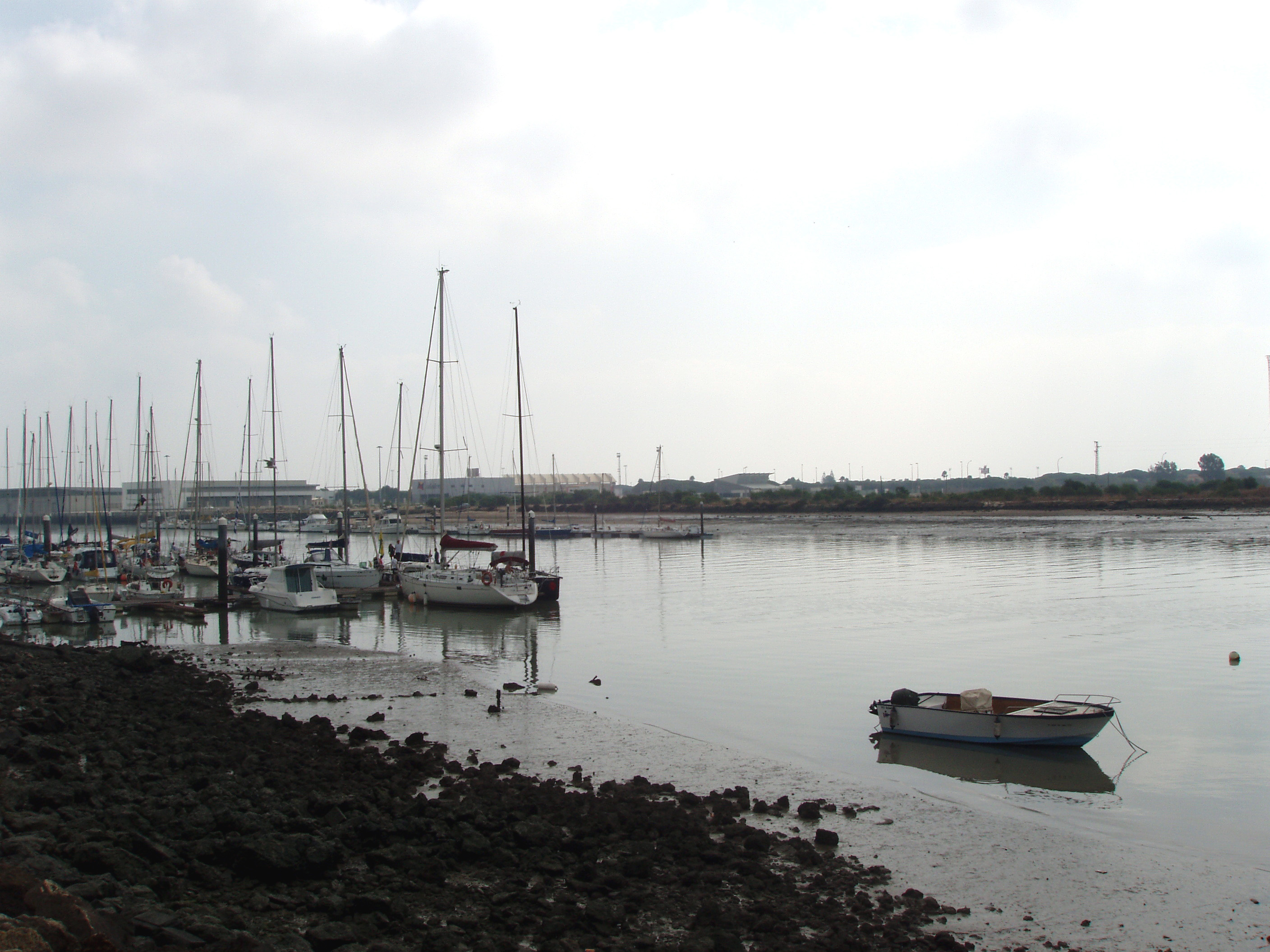
Guadalete River

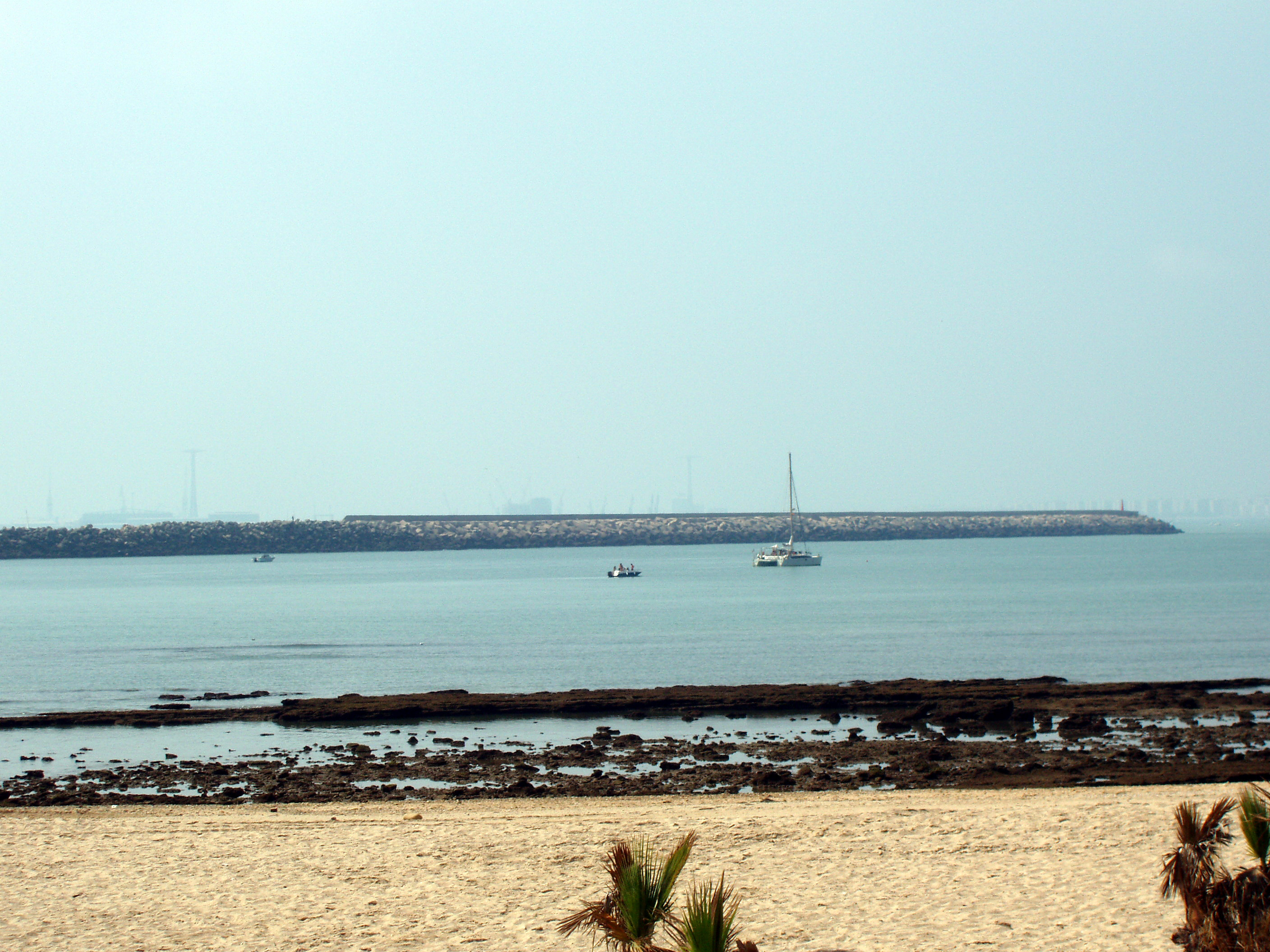
Puntilla Beach

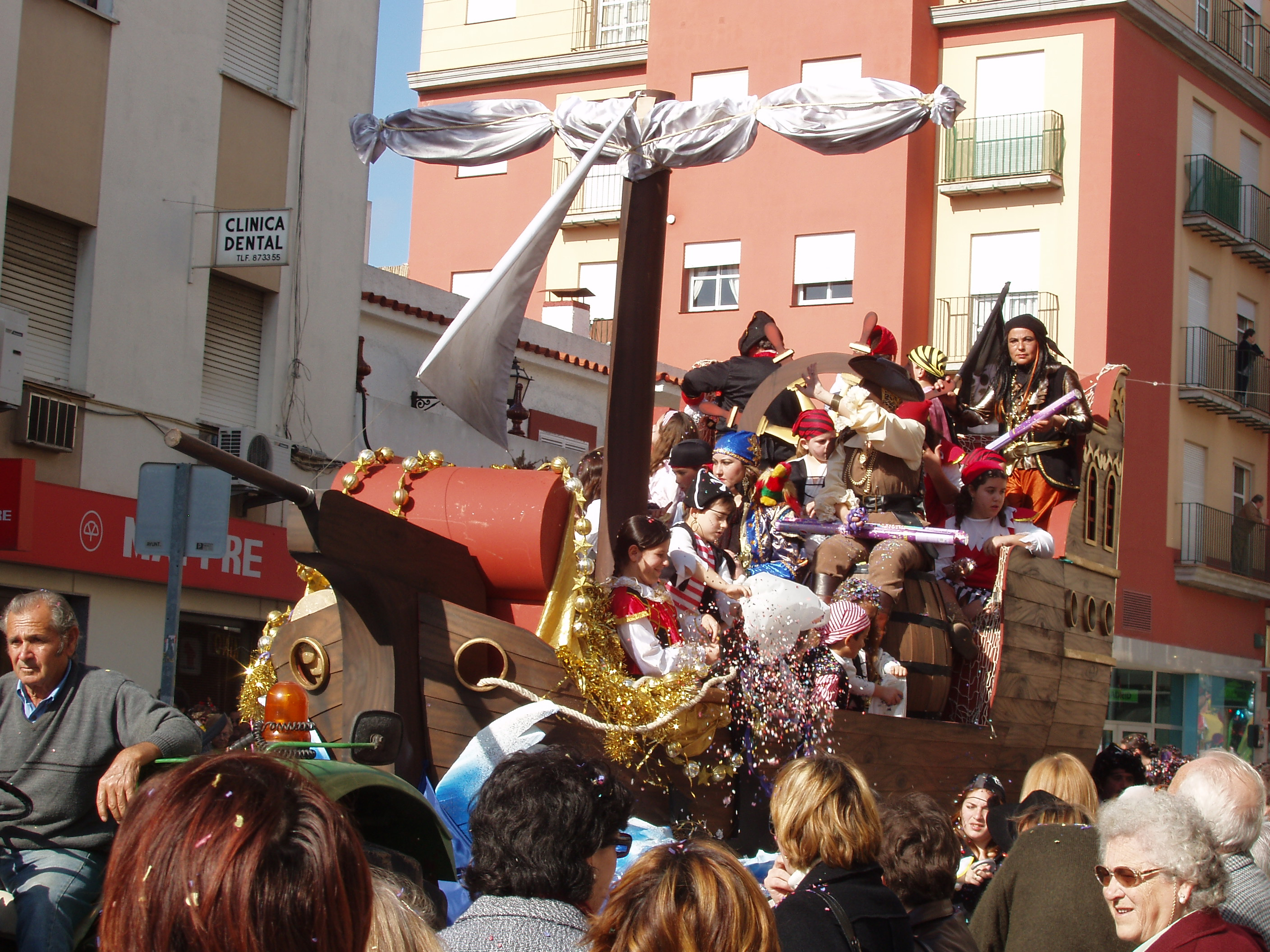
Carnival 2007

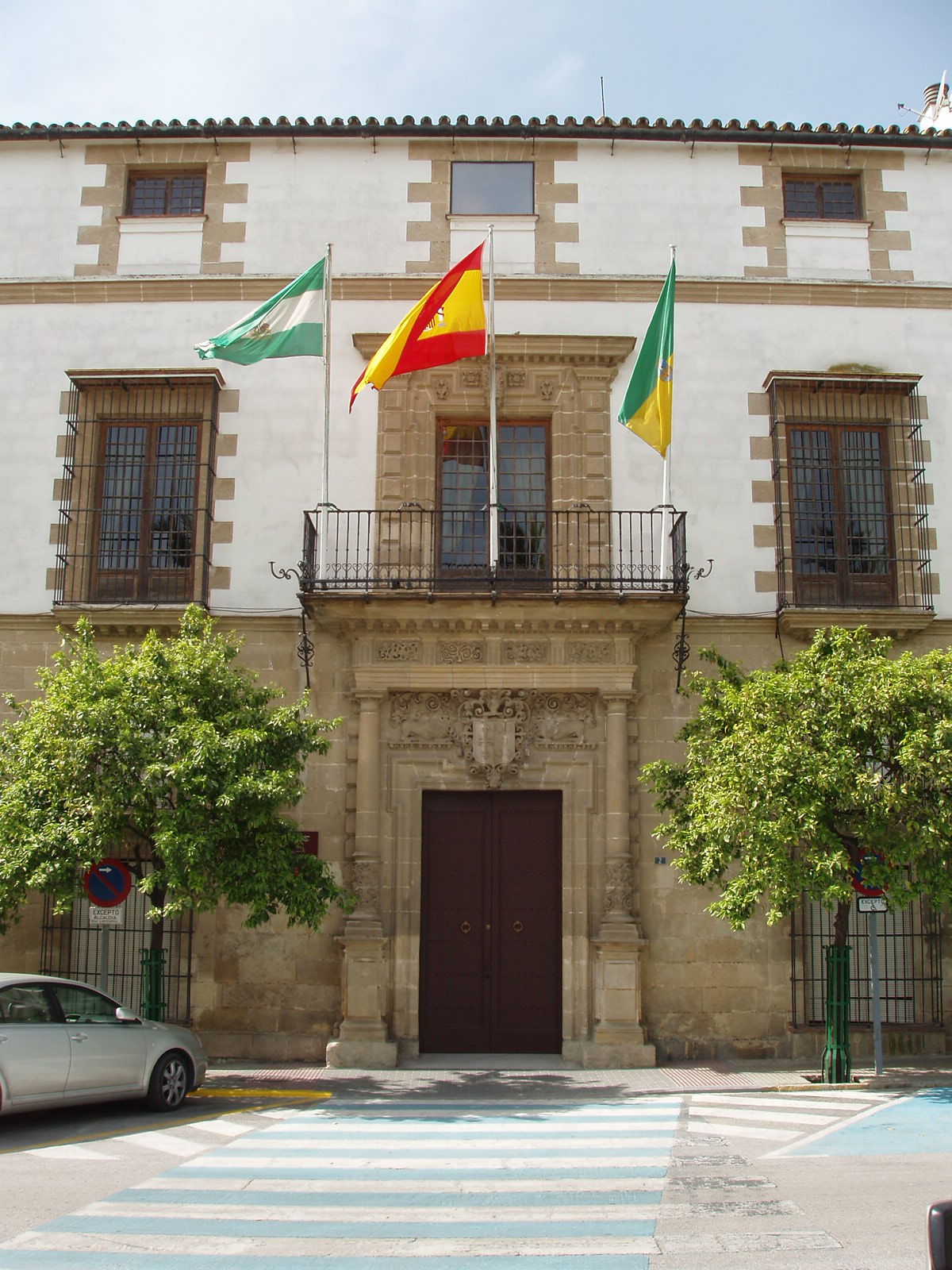
City Hall

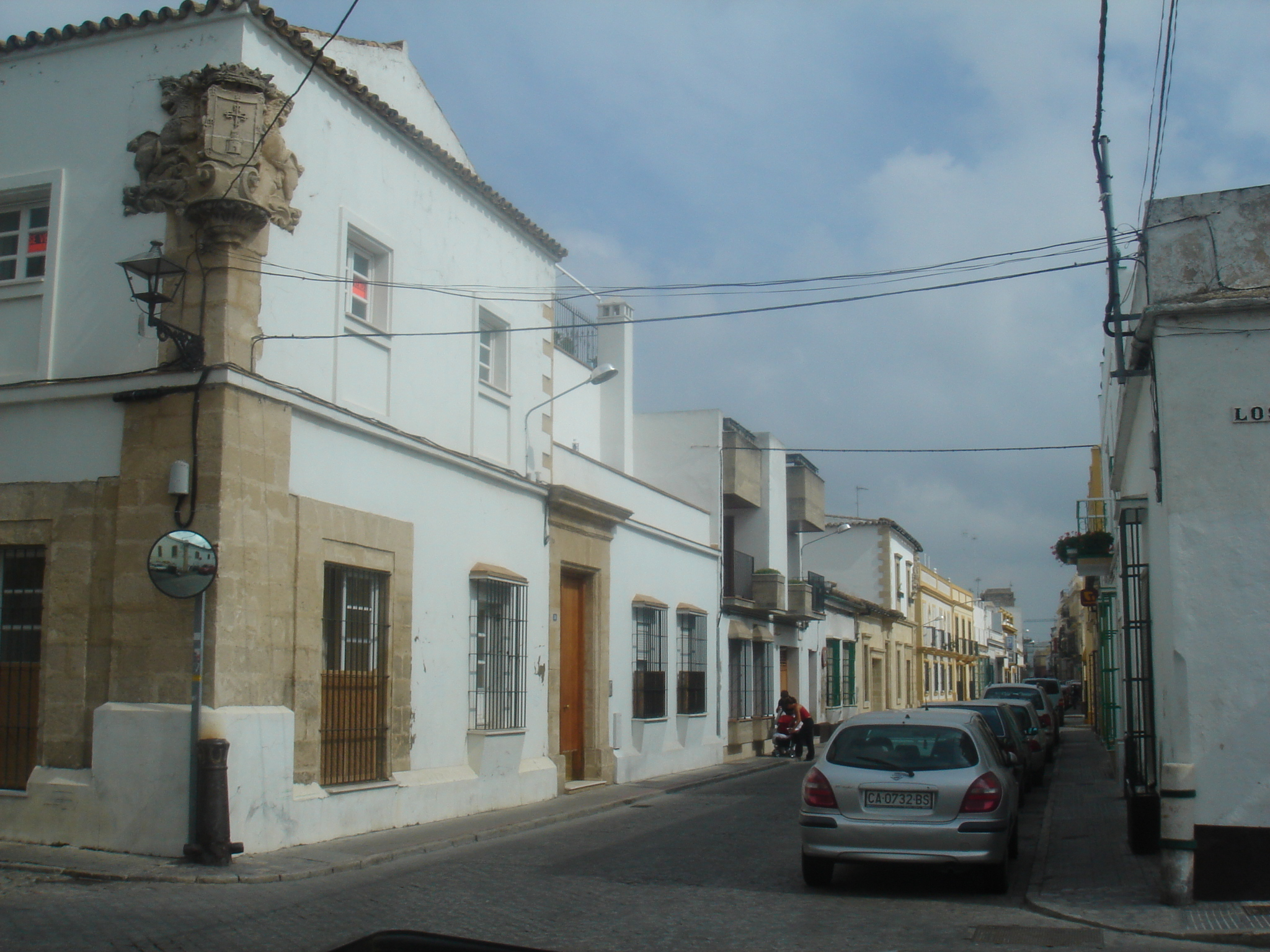
San Bartolomé street

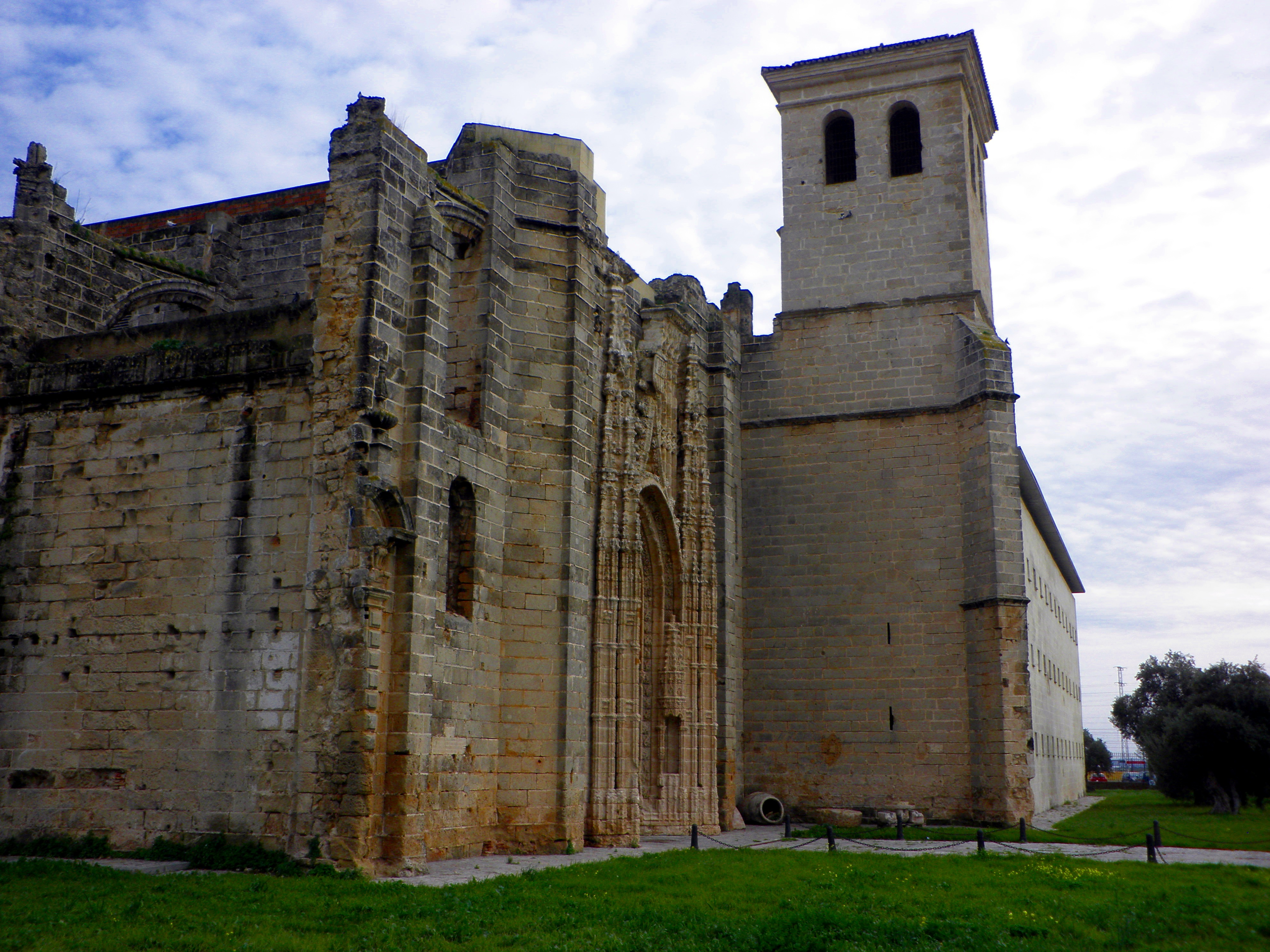
Monastery of La Victoria

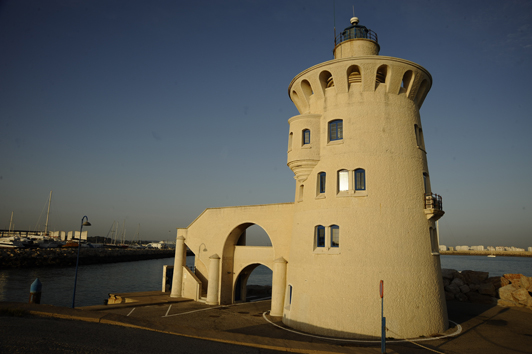
Lighthouse at the entrance of Puerto Sherry

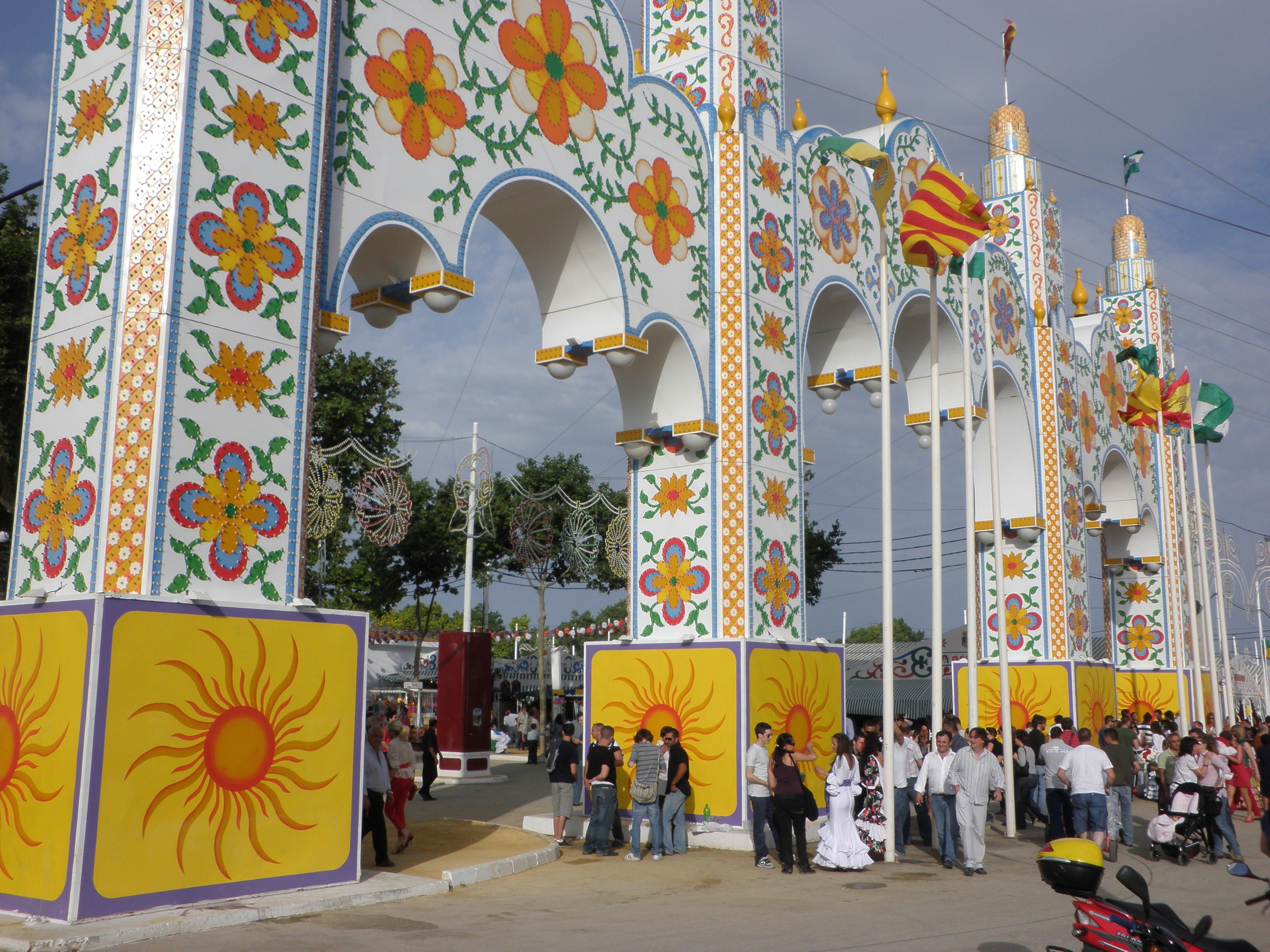
Entrance, "Feria de Primavera y Fiesta del Vino Fino" (Festival of Spring and Feast of Vino Fino

== See also ==
- History of Sherry
- List of Bienes de Interés Cultural in El Puerto de Santa María
- List of mayors of El Puerto de Santa María
- Archaeological site of Doña Blanca
- List of municipalities in Cádiz
