= Castle of San Marcos (El Puerto de Santa María) =

- Castillo de San Marcos (Spanish)
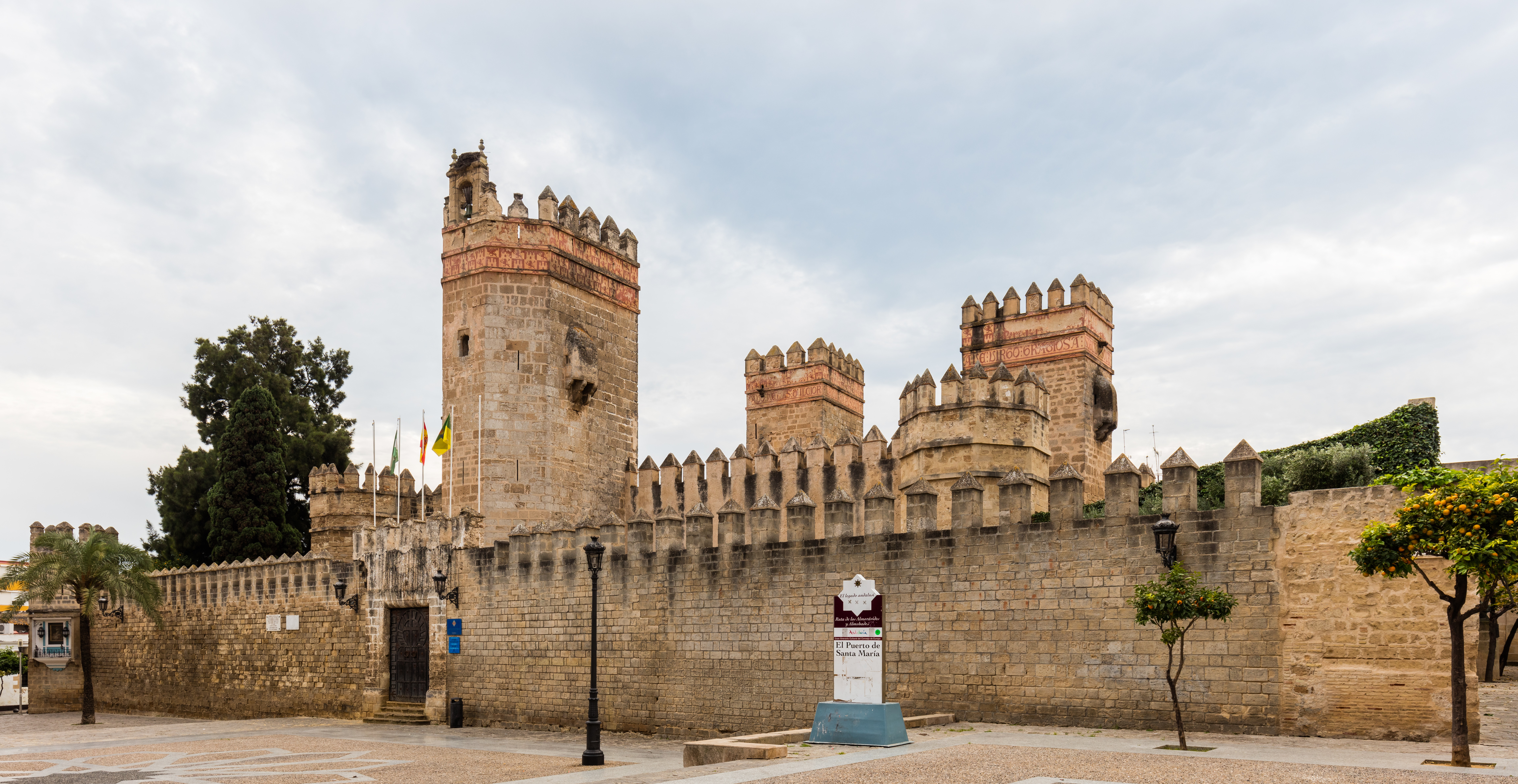
- Front view of Castle of San Marcos

- Location within Spain
- 36°35′47.04″N 6°13′35.91″W
- Location: El Puerto de Santa María, Cádiz, Spain

Spanish Cultural Heritage
- Official name: Castillo de San Marcos, Castillo de Alfonso X El Sabio
- Type: Non-movable
- Criteria: Monument
- Designated: 1920-08-30
- Reference no.: (R.I.) - 51 - 0000183 - 00000

Castle of San Marcos (also Castillo de Alfonso X El Sabio) is a medieval castle located in El Puerto de Santa María, Cádiz, Spain.

The castle was erected as a fortified church by King Alfonso X of Castile. It was built on the site of a mosque of which the wall of the qibla survives.

Close to the castle there is a replica of the map of Juan de la Cosa, along with an explanatory plaque, and a little fountain.

== Conservation ==
The castle was declared a national monument on 30 August 1920 and is currently listed in the Spanish heritage register as a Bien de Interés Cultural.

== Gallery ==
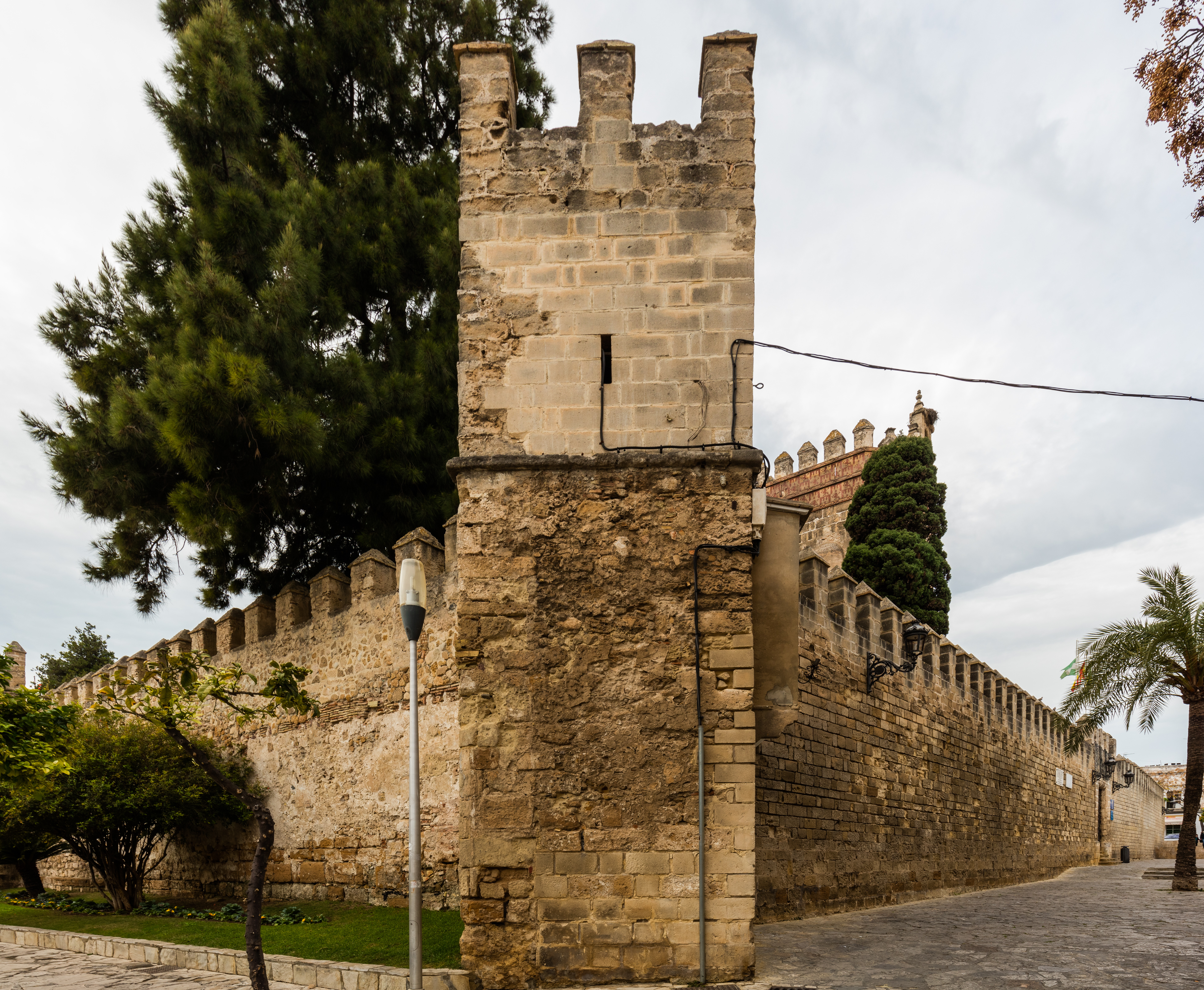
Lateral view

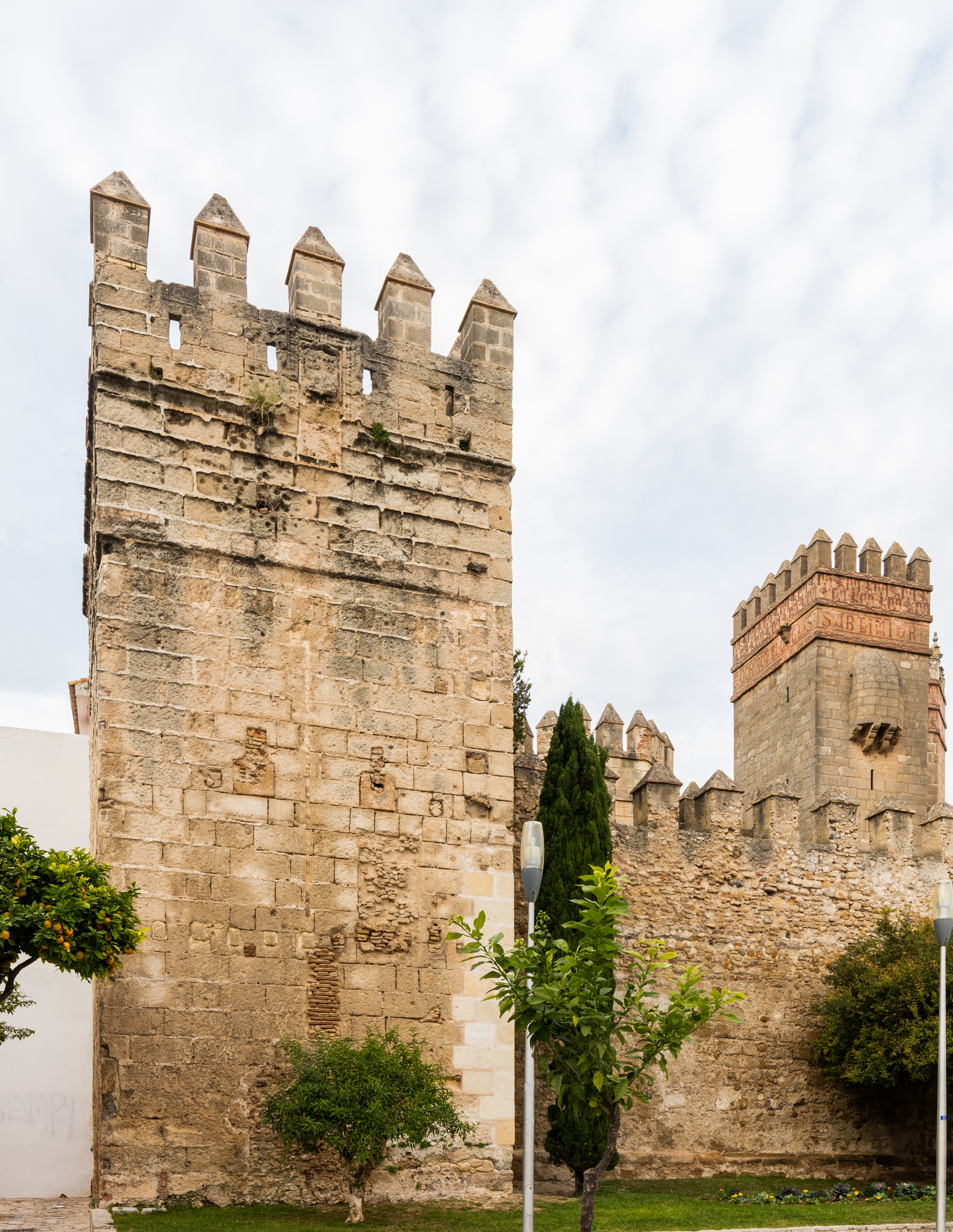
Detail of tower

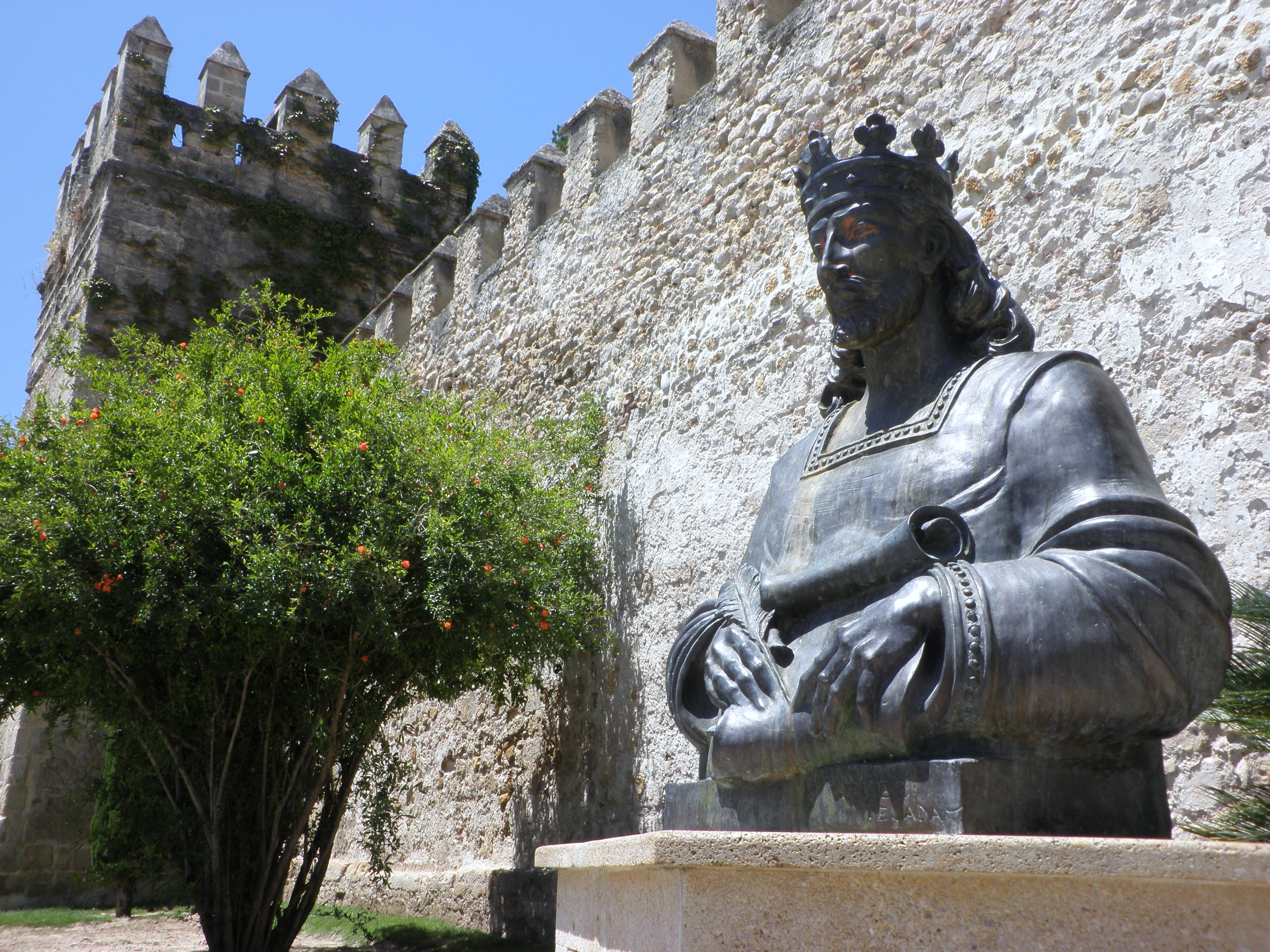
Statue of Alfonso X of Castile

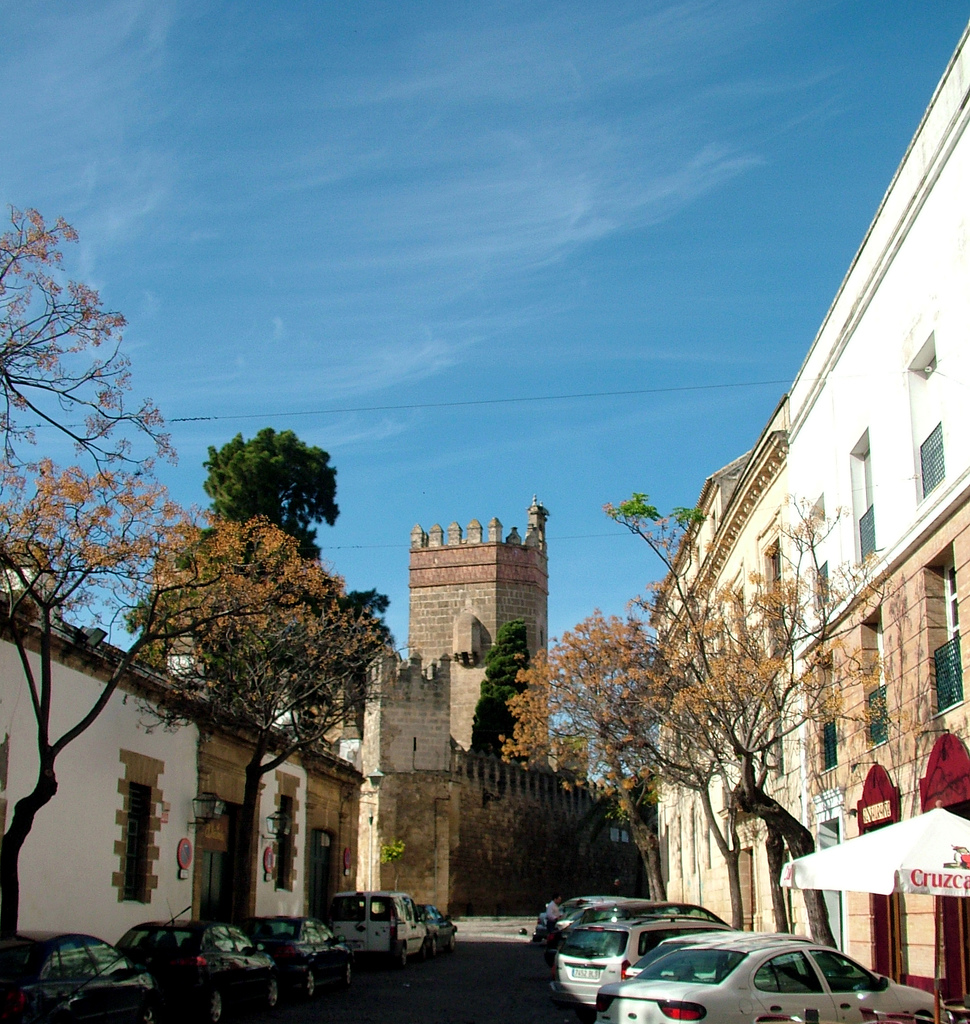
Far view

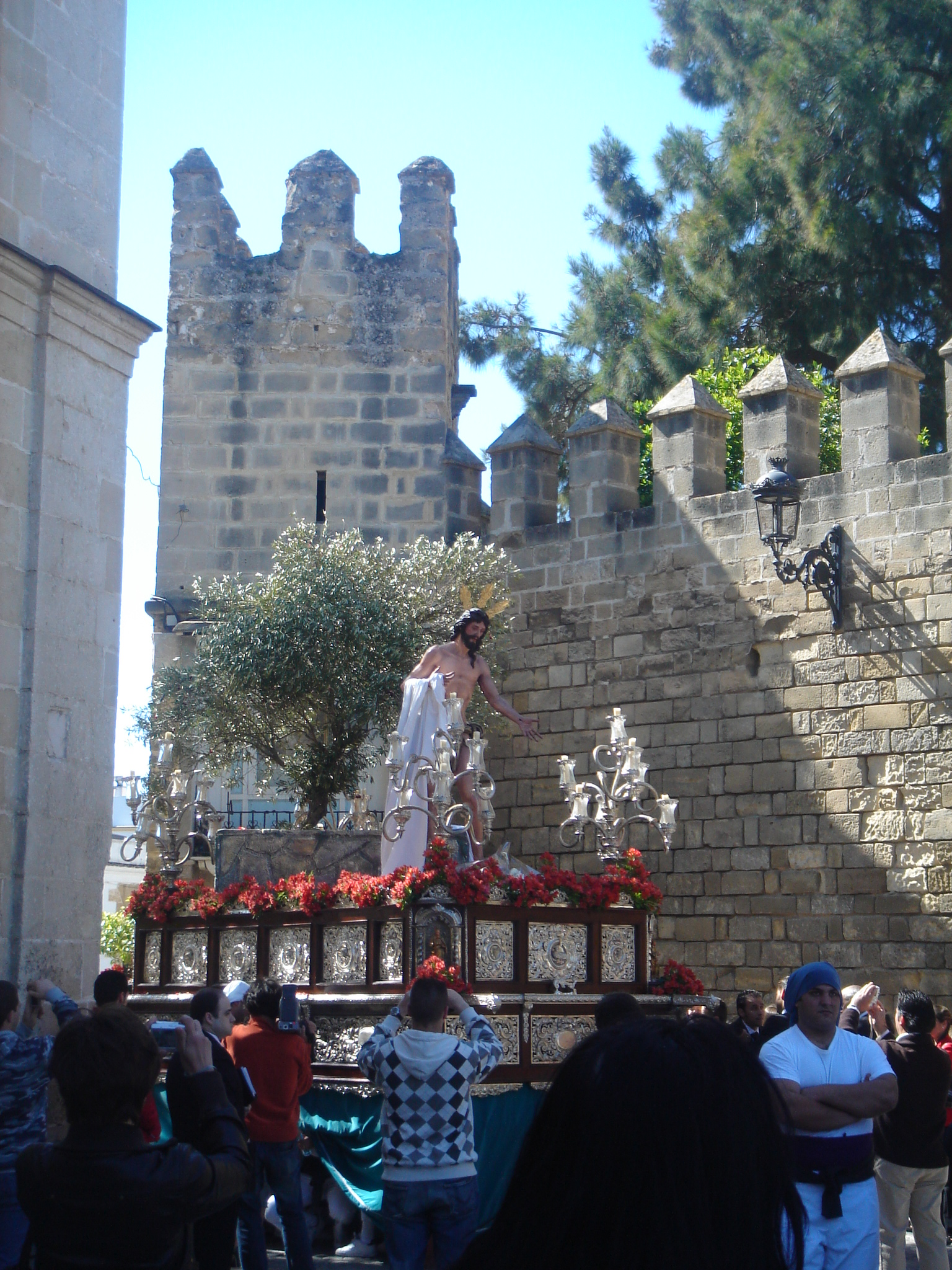
Paso in a procession of Holy Week

== See also ==
- List of Bienes de Interés Cultural in Cádiz
