= Cobbler =

Cobbler(s) may refer to:

- A person who repairs shoes
- Cobbler (food), a type of dessert

== Places ==
- The Cobbler, a mountain located near the head of Loch Long in Scotland
- Mount Cobbler, Australia
- Rainbow Cobblers, San Francisco, California

== Art, entertainment and media ==
- The Cobbler (1923 film), a short comedy by Hal Roach
- The Cobbler (2014 film), a comedy-drama starring Adam Sandler
- "Cobbler" (Better Call Saul), an episode of the TV series Better Call Saul

== Animals ==
- Cobbler or river cobbler, a marketing name in the UK for Southeast Asian Pangasius bocourti and Pangasius pangasius (also marketed as "basa", "pangasius" and "panga")
- Cobbler, a common name for Cnidoglanis macrocephalus, a species of catfish found along the coasts of Australia
- Cobbler, a common name for the South Australian cobbler, a brown fish found in estuaries in southern Australia
- Cobbler (Condica sutor), a North American moth in the family Noctuidae

== Other uses ==
- Sherry cobbler, a type of cocktail
- Cobbler (software), a network-oriented install server for Linux
- USS Cobbler, a United States Navy ship name
  - USS Cobbler (SS-344), a former submarine in the United States Navy
- "The Cobblers", a nickname for the English association football club Northampton Town F.C.
- Cobblers, a slang term for "nonsense"
- Hoboken Squat Cobbler, a fictitious fetish in Better Call Saul

== See also ==
- Cobble (disambiguation)
