= Dog's balls =

Dog's balls or dog's bollocks may refer to:

- The testicles of a dog
- Grewia retusifolia, a shrub species in the family Malvaceae
- Dog's bollocks, a slang expression in British English
- Dog's bollocks (typography), an outdated construction in British English
- Dog-balls, in golf, a score of eight on a single hole
- Dog Balls, a character in the 2006 Chinese film Trouble Makers
