= Bollocks =

Word of Anglo-Saxon origin, meaning "testicles"

Bollocks or bollock (/ˈbɒləks/) is a word of Middle English origin meaning "testicles". The word is often used in British English and Irish English in a multitude of negative ways; it most commonly appears as a noun meaning "rubbish" or "nonsense", an expletive following a minor accident or misfortune, or an adjective to describe something that is of poor quality or useless. It is also used in common phrases like "bollocks to this", which is said when quitting a task or job that is too difficult or negative, and "that's a load of old bollocks", which generally indicates contempt for a certain subject or opinion. Conversely, the word also appears in positive phrases such as "the dog's bollocks" or more simply "the bollocks", which will refer to something which is admired or well-respected. (Note: "Dog's bollocks" has been naturally extended "sometimes for decorum's sake, and refer to the 'mutt's nuts', the 'puppy's privates', or... 'badger's nadgers'.")

== Etymology ==
The Oxford English Dictionary (OED) gives examples of its usage dating back to the 13th century. One of the early references is Wycliffe's Bible (1382), Leviticus xxii, 24: "Al beeste, that ... kitt and taken awey the ballokes is, ye shulen not offre to the Lord ..." (any beast that is cut and taken away the bollocks, you shall not offer to the Lord, i.e. castrated animals are not suitable as sacrifices).

The OED states (with abbreviations expanded): "Probably a derivative of Teutonic ball-, of which the Old English representative would be inferred as beall-u, -a, or -e". The Teutonic ball- in turn probably derives from the Proto-Indo-European base *bhel-, to inflate or swell. This base also forms the root of many other words, including "phallus".

=== Meaning "nonsense" ===
The meaning of nonsense is a corruption of bullocks from the Old Testament. Ecclesiasticus, chapter 38, verse 25- How can he get wisdom ... whose talk is of bullocks. From the 17th to the 19th century, bollocks or ballocks was allegedly used as a slang term for a clergyman, although this meaning is not mentioned by the OED's 1989 edition. For example, in 1684, the Commanding Officer of the Straits Fleet regularly referred to his chaplain as "Ballocks". It has been suggested that bollocks came to have its modern meaning of "nonsense" because some clergymen were notorious for talking nonsense during their sermons.

== Severity ==
Originally, the word "bollocks" was the everyday vernacular word for testicles—as noted above, it was used in this sense in the first English-language Bible, in the 14th century. By the mid-17th century, at least, it had begun to acquire coarse figurative meanings (see § Bollocking), for example in a translation of works by Rabelais.

It did not appear in Samuel Johnson's 1755 dictionary of the English language. It was also omitted from the 1933 Oxford English Dictionary and its 1941 reprint, finally appearing in the 1972 supplement. The first modern English dictionary to include an entry for "bollocks" was G. N. Garmonsway's Penguin English Dictionary of 1965.

The relative severity of the various profanities, as perceived by the British public, was studied on behalf of the Broadcasting Standards Commission, Independent Television Commission, BBC and Advertising Standards Authority. The results of this jointly commissioned research were published in December 2000 in a paper called "Delete Expletives?". This placed "bollocks" in eighth position in terms of its perceived severity, between "prick" (seventh place) and "arsehole" (ninth place). By comparison, the word "balls" (which has some similar meanings) was down in 22nd place. Of the people surveyed, 25% thought that "bollocks" should not be broadcast at all, and only 11% thought that it could acceptably be broadcast at times before the national 9 pm "watershed" on television (radio does not have a watershed). 25% of the people regarded "bollocks" as "very severe", 32% "quite severe", 34% "mild" and 8% considered it "not swearing".

A survey of the language of London teenagers (published in 2002) examined, amongst other things, the incidence of various swearwords in their speech. It noted that the top ten swearwords make up 81% of the total swearwords. "Bollocks" was the seventh most frequent swearword, after "fucking", "shit", "fuck", "bloody", "hell" and "fuck off". Below "bollocks" were "bastard", "bitch" and "damn", in eighth, ninth and tenth places. This research regarded these words as swearwords in the context of their usage but observed that some might be inoffensive in other contexts.

Some campaigners, particularly the Liberal Democrats, hoping to stop the UK's departure from the European Union adopted the slogan, "Bollocks to Brexit". When queried about the propriety of the use of this term in Parliament in January 2019, the Speaker of the House, John Bercow ruled that the use of the word in Parliamentary speech was "not disorderly".

== Negative uses ==
=== "Talking bollocks" and "bollockspeak" ===
"Talking bollocks" generally means talking nonsense or bullshit, for example: "Don't listen to him, he's talking bollocks", or "talking absolute bollocks". Another example is "I told Maurice that he was talking bollocks, that he was full of shit and that his opinions were a pile of piss. (Rhetoric was always my indulgence.)" "Talking bollocks" in a corporate context is referred to as bollockspeak. Bollockspeak tends to be buzzword-laden and largely content-free, like gobbledygook: "Rupert, we'll have to leverage our synergies to facilitate a paradigm shift by Q4" is an example of management bollockspeak. There is a whole parodic book entitled The Little Book of Management Bollocks. When a great deal of bollocks is being spoken, it may be said that the 'bollocks quotient' is high.

=== A "bollocks" (singular noun) ===
Comparable to cock-up, screw-up, balls-up, fuck-up etc. Used with the indefinite article, it means a disaster, a mess or a failure. It is often used pejoratively, as in to have "made a bollocks out of it", and it is generally used throughout Britain and Ireland.

=== Bollocks up (transitive verb) ===
To bollocks something up means "to mess something up". It refers to a botched job: "Well, you bollocksed it up that time, Your Majesty!" or "Bollocksed up at work again, I fear. Millions down the drain".

=== To "drop a bollock" ===
To "drop a bollock" describes the malfunction of an operation, or messing something up, as in many sports, and in more polite business parlance, dropping the ball brings play to an unscheduled halt.

=== Bollocking ===
==== Noun ====
A "bollocking" usually denotes a robust verbal chastisement for something which one has done (or not done, as the case may be), for instance: "I didn't do my homework and got a right bollocking off Mr Smith", or "A nurse was assisting at an appendix operation when she shouldn't have been ... and the surgeon got a bollocking". Actively, one gives or delivers a bollocking to someone; in the building trade one can 'throw a right bollocking into' someone.

The Oxford English Dictionary gives the earliest meaning as "to slander or defame" and suggests that it entered the English language from the 1653 translation of one of Rabelais' works, which includes the Middle French expression "en couilletant", translated as "ballocking". The earliest printed use in the sense of a severe reprimand is, according to the OED, from 1946.

==== Adjective ====
Bollocking can also be used as a reinforcing adjective: "He hasn't a bollocking clue!" or "Where's me bollocking car?"

=== "A kick in the bollocks" ===
"A kick in the bollocks" is used to describe a significant setback or disappointment, e.g. "I was diagnosed with having skin cancer. Ye Gods! What a kick in the bollocks".

=== "Freeze (or work) one's bollocks off" ===
To freeze one's bollocks off means to be very cold. To "work one's bollocks off" is to work very hard. This phrase is also sometimes used by or about women: Boy George referred to his mother "working her bollocks off" at home.

=== "Bollock naked" ===
"Bollock naked" is used in the singular form to emphasise being completely nude: "he was completely pissed and stark bollock naked".

=== Bollocks (singular noun) ===
In Ireland, "bollocks", "ballocks" or "bollox" can be used as a singular noun to mean a despicable or notorious person, for instance: "Who's the old ballocks you were talking to?"

=== "Bollocksed" ===
Multiple meanings, also spelled "bolloxed" or "bollixed":

1. Exhausted: "I couldn't sleep at all last night, I'm completely bollocksed!"
2. Broken: "My foot pump is bollocksed."
3. An extreme state of inebriation or drug-induced stupor: "Last night I got completely bollocksed".
4. Hungover (or equivalent): "I drank two bottles of gin last night, I'm completely bollocksed."
5. Made a mistake: "I tried to draw that landscape, but I bollocksed it up."

The phrase "bollocksed up" means to be in a botched, bungled, confused or disarrayed state; e.g. "He managed to bollix up the whole project." In the printing and newspaper industries, dropping a California Job type case of moveable type – spilling the contents – was a classic example of "bollocksing up the works". The box was called "pied". "Bollocksed" in that sense meant "beyond all repair".

== Positive uses ==
=== "Dog's bollocks" ===
A usage with a positive (albeit still vulgar) sense is "the dog's bollocks" or simplified "The Bollocks". An example of this usage is: "Before Tony Blair's speech, a chap near me growled: 'He thinks he's the 'dog's bollocks'. Well, he's entitled to. It was a commanding speech: a real 'dog's bollocks' of an oration."

Although this is a recent term (the Online Etymology Dictionary dates it to 1989,) its origins are obscure. Etymologist Eric Partridge and the Oxford English Dictionary believe the term comes from the now obsolete typographical sequence of a colon and a dash :-. This typography, using a dash following a colon -:, was used to introduce a list. Thus, it is a very early example of an emoticon.

The Oxford English Dictionary says the following mark (":— ") is entitled "the dog’s bollocks", defined as: "typogr. a colon followed by a dash, regarded as forming a shape resembling the male sexual organs." The usage is cited to the year 1949.

This phrase has found its way into popular culture in a number of ways. There is a beer brewed in England by the Wychwood Brewery called the Dog's Bollocks, as well as a lager cocktail.

The Dutch city Groningen has a pub-style café named "The dog's bollocks".

=== "Chuffed to one's bollocks" ===
The phrase "chuffed to one's bollocks" describes someone who is very pleased with themselves. Nobel laureate Harold Pinter used this in The Homecoming. The phrase provided a serious challenge to translators of his work. Pinter used a similar phrase in an open letter, published in The Guardian, and addressed to Prime Minister Tony Blair, attacking his co-operation with American foreign policy. The letter ends by saying "Oh, by the way, meant to mention, forgot to tell you, we were all chuffed to the bollocks when Labour won the election."

== Other uses ==
- "Bollock-head" is a vulgar British term for a shaven head. It can also refer to someone who is stupid, as can "bollock-brain". The Dictionary of the Vulgar Tongue (1811) cites the expression "His brains are in his ballocks", to designate a fool.

=== Bollards ===
The 2007 Concise new Partridge dictionary of slang and unconventional English quotes "bollards" as meaning "testicles" and that it is a play on the word bollocks.

== Literature ==
The play Sodom, or the Quintessence of Debauchery, published in 1684 and ascribed to John Wilmot, 2nd Earl of Rochester, includes a character named Bolloxinion, King of Sodom (along with other characters with names such as General Buggeranthos and the maid of honour, Fuckadilla). The word bollox appears several times in the text, such as:

Had all mankind, whose pintles I adore,
With well fill'd bollox swiv'd me o'er and o'er.
None could in nature have oblig'd me more.

In 1690, the publisher Benjamin Crayle was fined 20 pounds and sent to prison for his part in publishing the play.

In one of the tales in Burton's 1885 translation of The Book of the Thousand Nights and a Night, Kafur, the eunuch, says:

But now my spirit is broken and my tricks are gone from me, so alas! are my ballocks.

== Obscenity court ruling ==
Perhaps the best-known use of the term is in the title of the 1977 punk rock album Never Mind the Bollocks, Here's the Sex Pistols. Testimony in a resulting prosecution over the term demonstrated that in Old English, the word meant a small ball, in the 19th century it was also nickname for clergymen, and then came to used to mean "nonsense". Defence barrister John Mortimer QC and Virgin Records won the case: the court ruled that the word was not obscene. It just means "put aside all of that other rubbish and pay attention to this".

In a summary for the defence, Mortimer asked,

What sort of country are we living in if a politician comes to Nottingham and speaks here to a group of people in the city centre and during his speech a heckler replies "bollocks". Are we to expect this person to be incarcerated, or do we live in a country where we are proud of our Anglo-Saxon language? Do we wish our language to be virile and strong or watered down and weak?

Tony Wright, a Leicestershire trader, was given an £80 fixed penalty fine by police for selling T-shirts bearing the slogan "Bollocks to Blair". This took place on 29 June 2006 at the Royal Norfolk Show; the police issued the penalty notice, quoting Section 5 of the Public Order Act 1986 which refers to language "deemed to cause harassment, alarm or distress". The case was later dropped.

== See also ==
- A load of old cobblers
- Art Bollocks
- Bullock (disambiguation)
- Wikisaurus:testicles
