= The Cobbler (disambiguation) =

The Cobbler is a Scottish mountain

The Cobbler may also refer to:

- The Cobbler (1923 film), an Our Gang short subject comedy
- The Cobbler (2014 film), an American comedy-drama film

== See also ==
- Cobbler (disambiguation)
