= Cobble =

Cobble may refer to:

- Cobble (geology), a designation of particle size for sediment or clastic rock
- Cobblestone, partially rounded rocks used for road paving
- Hammerstone, a prehistoric stone tool
- Tyringham Cobble, a nature reserve in Tyringham, Massachusetts, U.S.
- Bartholomew's Cobble, a park near Sheffield, Massachusetts, U.S.
- Dorothy Sue Cobble (born 1949), American historian

== See also ==
- Coble, a shallow-bottomed, low-draught fishing boat
- Cobbler (disambiguation)
- Kabul, the capital city of Afghanistan
- Cobblestone (disambiguation)
