= Rebujito =

Cocktail containing sherry and soft drinks

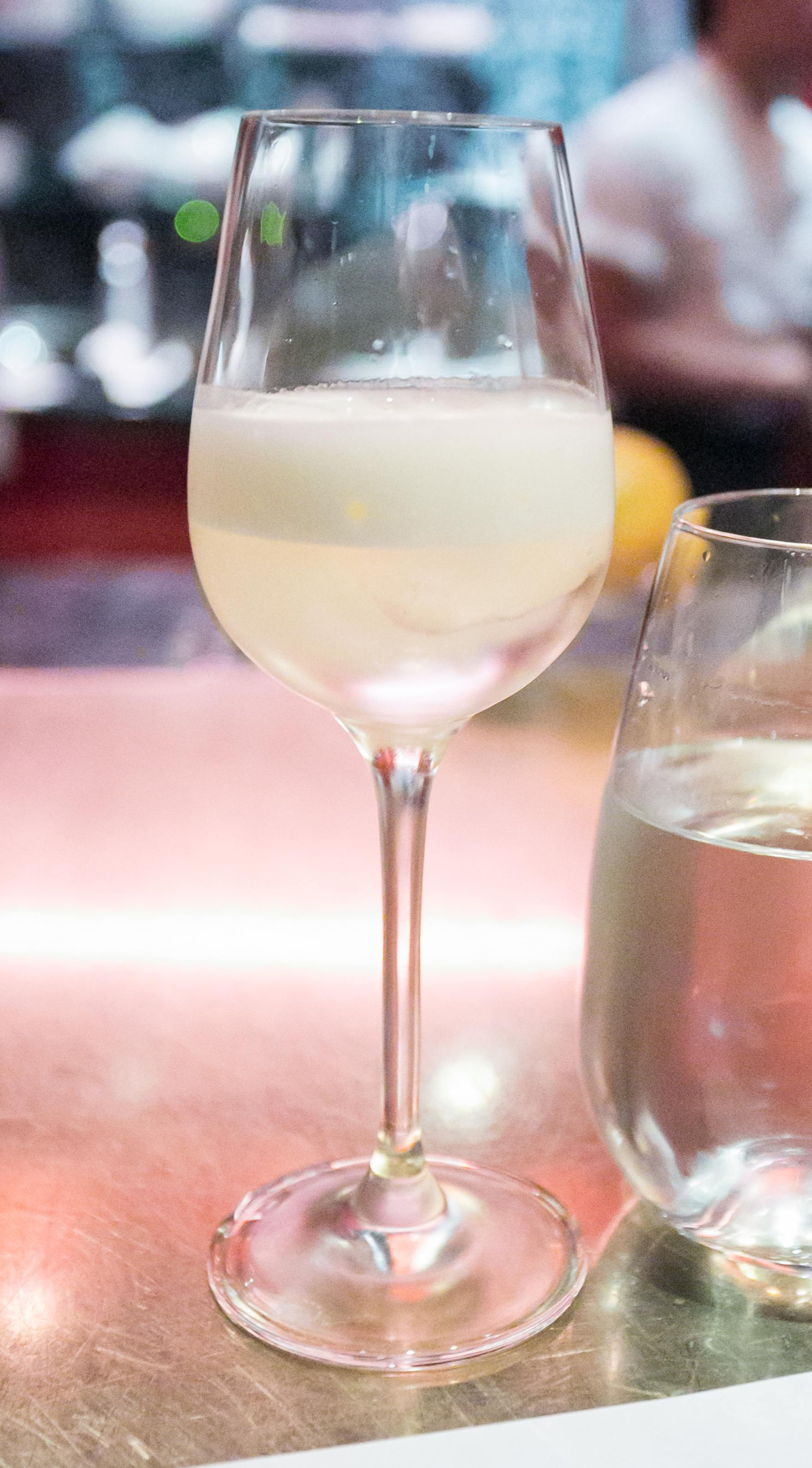
Rebujito

Rebujito is a cocktail invented in Andalusia that mixes sherry (Manzanilla or Fino) and soft drinks, typically white lemonade or lemon-lime soda.

Rebujito is a common drink in Andalusia, and is typical at the Seville Fair and Feria de Jerez.

It is similar to a sherry cobbler.
