= Cobblestone (disambiguation) =

Cobblestones are small stones used in paving streets.

Cobblestone may also refer to:

- Cobble (geology), a class of rock fragment larger than a pebble and smaller than a boulder
- Cobblestone (magazine), a children's magazine
- A unit of credit in the BOINC Credit System of the BOINC platform for volunteer computing
- The Pebbles of Etratat, 1972 film also known as Cobblestones
- Cobblestone Records, a jazz record label during the 1970s
- Cobblestone Jazz, an electronic music band
- The Cobblestone, an Irish pub

== See also ==
- Cobble (disambiguation)
