= Seville Fair =

Annual fair in Spain

Seville April Fair Feria de Abril de Sevilla
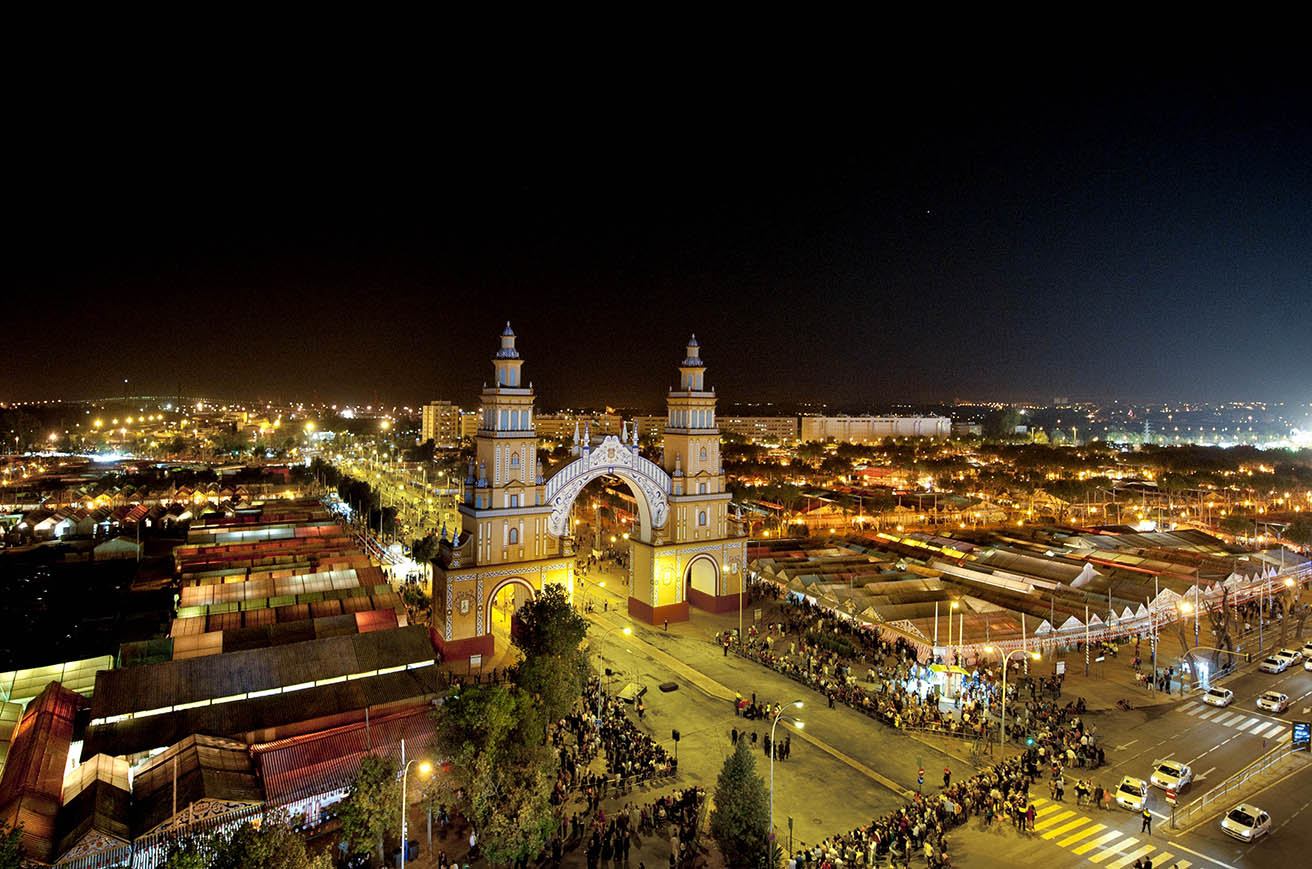
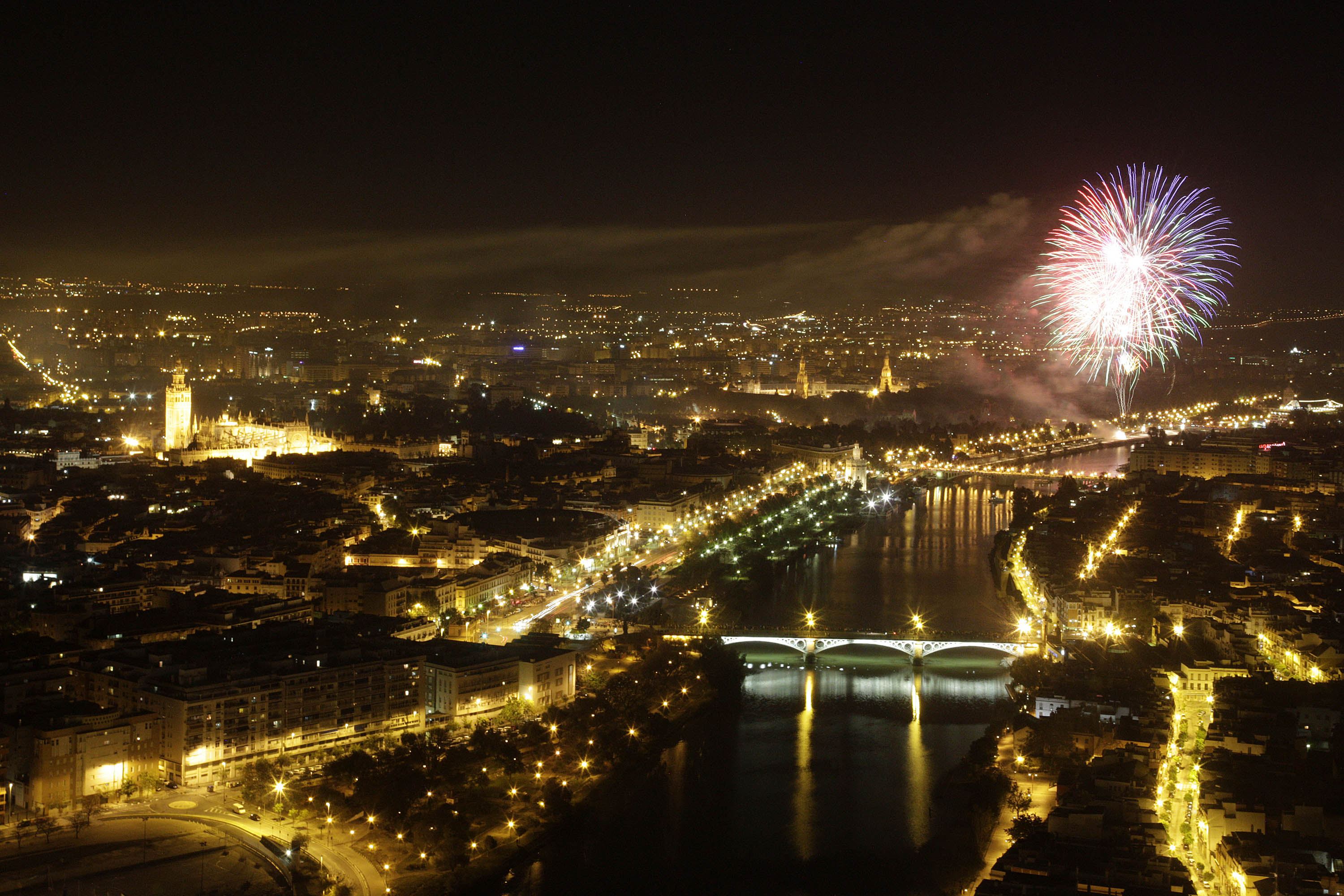
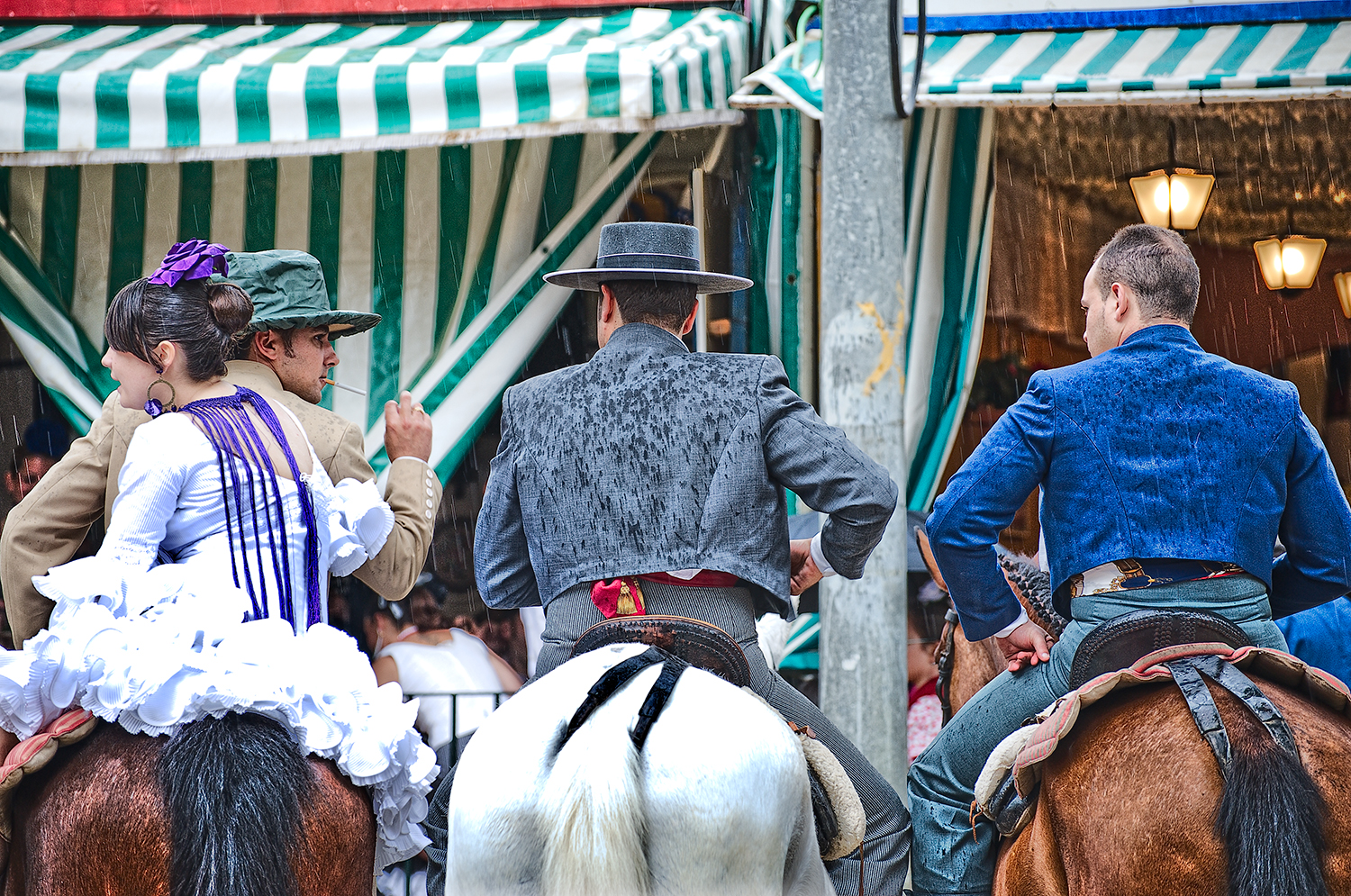
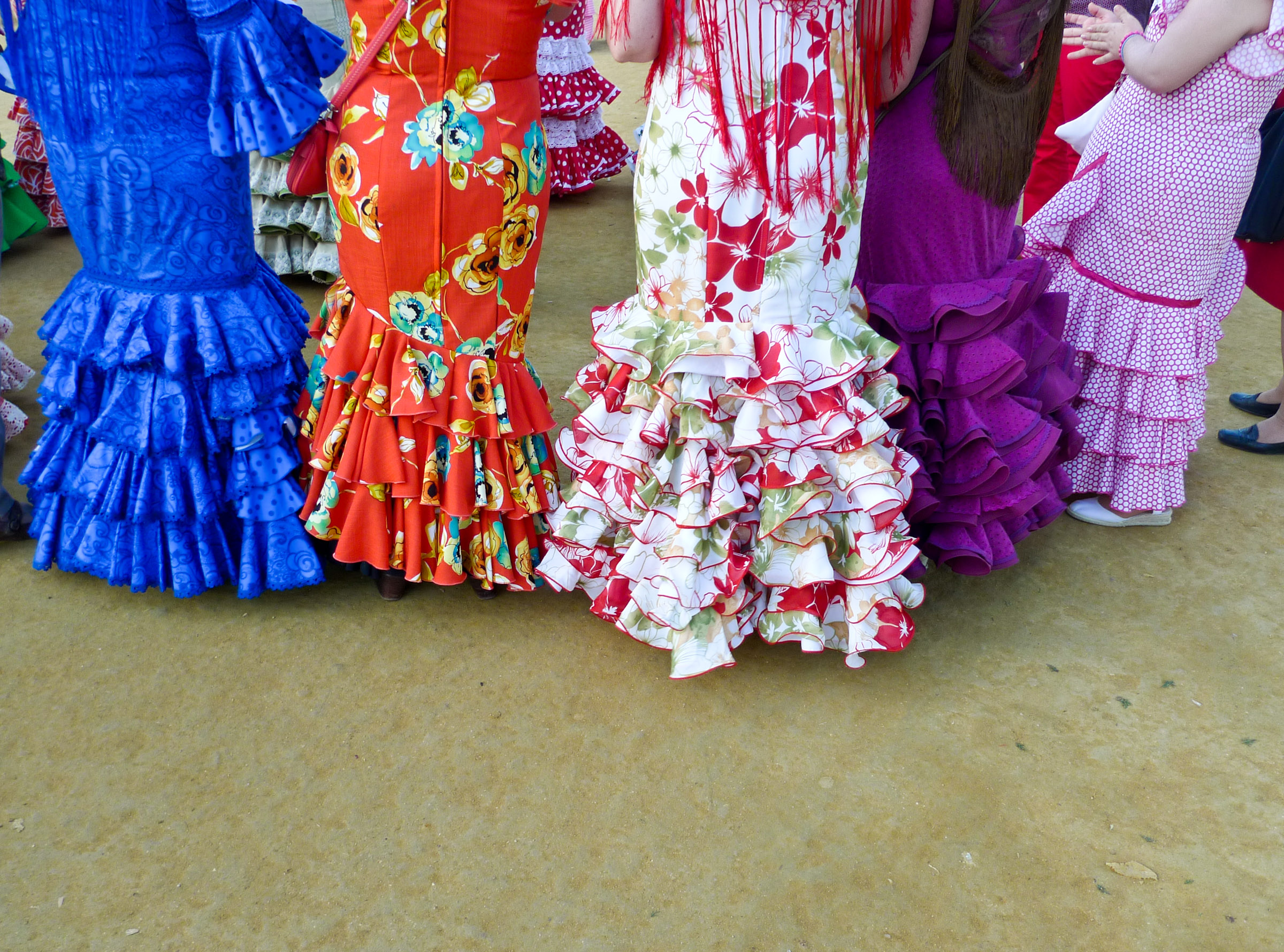
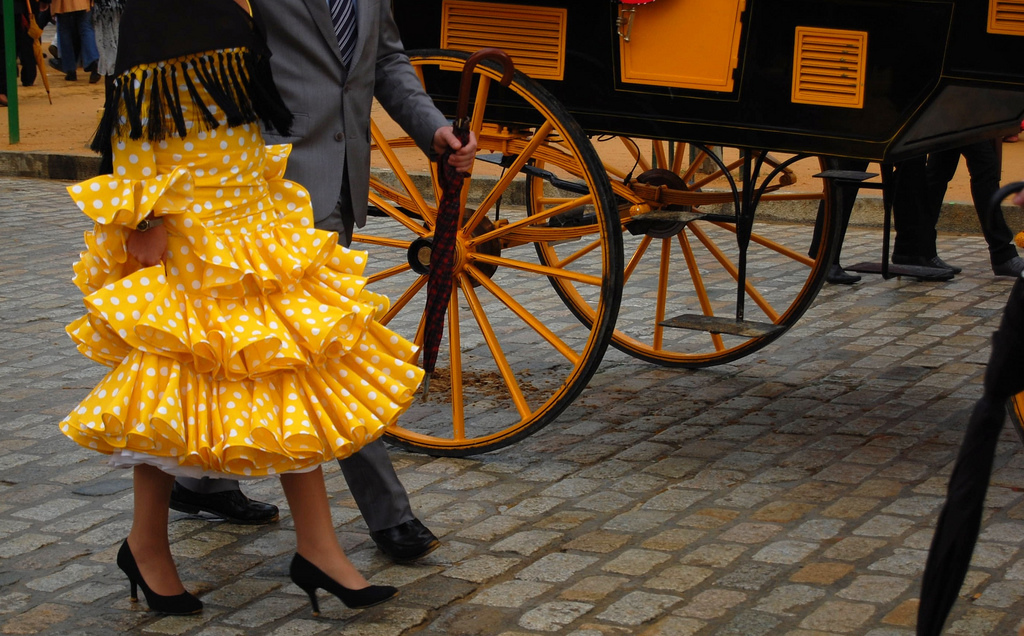
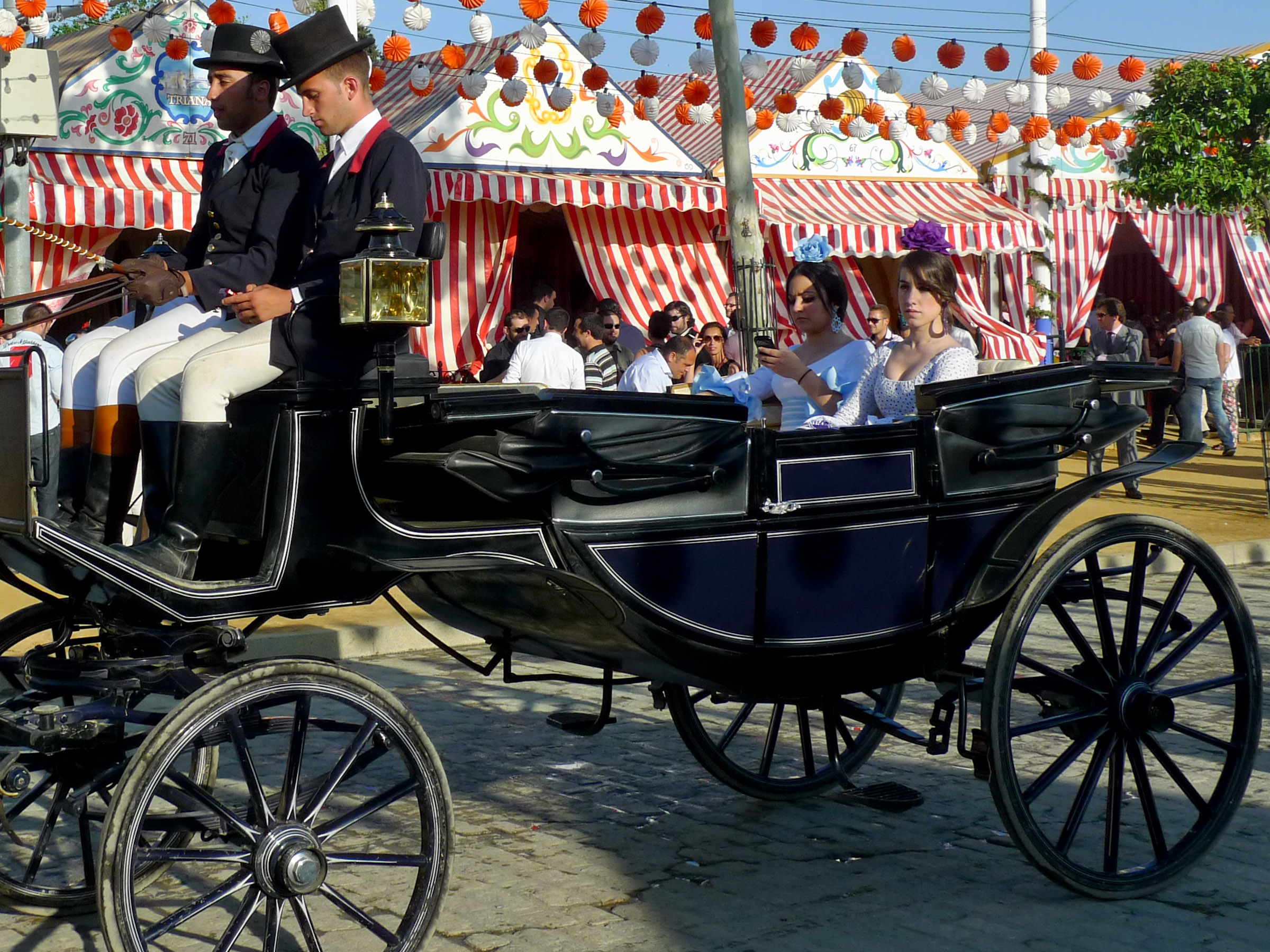
- Dates: A week in the spring (two weeks after Easter)
- Locations: Seville, Spain
- Coordinates: 37°22′16″N 5°59′51″W
- Founded: 25 August 1846
- Attendance: 5,000,000 (week total); 850,000 (Friday night)
- Budget: €3,000,000

Fiesta of International Tourist Interest
- Designated: 1980

The Seville Fair (officially and in Spanish: Feria de Abril de Sevilla, 'Seville April Fair') is held in the Andalusian capital of Seville, Spain. The fair generally begins two weeks after the Semana Santa, or Easter Holy Week.

The fair officially begins at midnight on Monday, and runs six days, ending on the following Sunday. Each day the fiesta begins with the parade of carriages and riders, at midday, carrying Seville's leading citizens which make their way to the bullring, La Real Maestranza, where the bullfighters and breeders meet.

For the duration of the fair, the fairgrounds and a vast area on the far bank of the Guadalquivir River are totally covered in rows of casetas (individual decorated marquee tents which are temporarily built on the fairground). These casetas usually belong to prominent families of Seville, groups of friends, clubs, trade associations and political parties. From around nine at night until six or seven the following morning, at first in the streets and later only within each caseta, there are crowds partying and dancing sevillanas, drinking sherry, manzanilla or rebujito, and eating tapas. This fair also has an amusement park that comes with it and has many games to play along with rollercoasters to ride.

== History ==
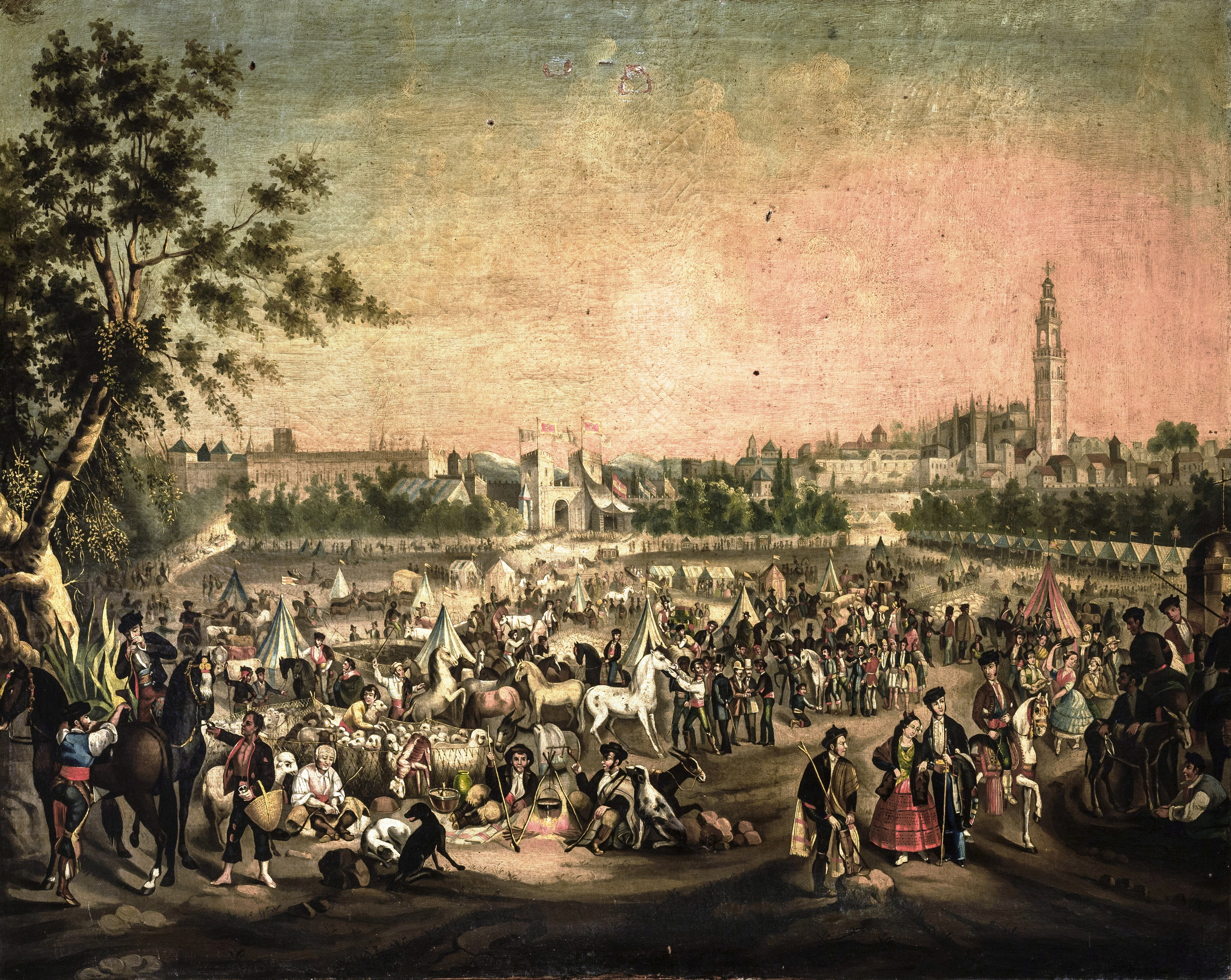
Seville Fair in the 19th century

The Fair dates back to 1846 when it was originally organized as a livestock fair by two councillors born in Northern Spain, Basque José María Ybarra and Catalan Narciso Bonaplata. Queen Isabel II agreed to the proposal, and on 18 April 1847 the first fair was held at the Prado de San Sebastián, on the outskirts of the city.

It took only one year before an air of festivity began to transform the fair, due mainly to the emergence of the first three casetas, belonging to the Duke and Duchess of Montpensier, the Town Hall, and the Casino of Seville. During the 1920s, the fair reached its peak and became the spectacle that it is today.

== Location ==
Since 1973, Feria de Abril takes place at the Real de la Feria, an area of 24 blocks (450,000 m^{2}) which is located between Los Remedios and Tablada. In 2012 there were 1048 casetas. The streets of the Real are named after famous bullfighters such as Juan Belmonte and Pascual Márquez. Next to the Real is the Calle del Infierno (Hell Road), an amusement park which offers many recreational activities; a circus is usually set furthest from the Real on the back of the Parque de los Príncipes. Construction of the portada (the main gate) starts months in advance, and it takes several weeks to clear the place after the end of the fair.

Street plan of Feria de Abril de Sevilla

Plans to relocate the Fair to the Charco de la Pava have existed for the past 20 years, but the local government is yet to present any plans to transform the Real. For years the Charco de la Pava has been used as the main parking lot for fair attendees.

== Pescaíto ==
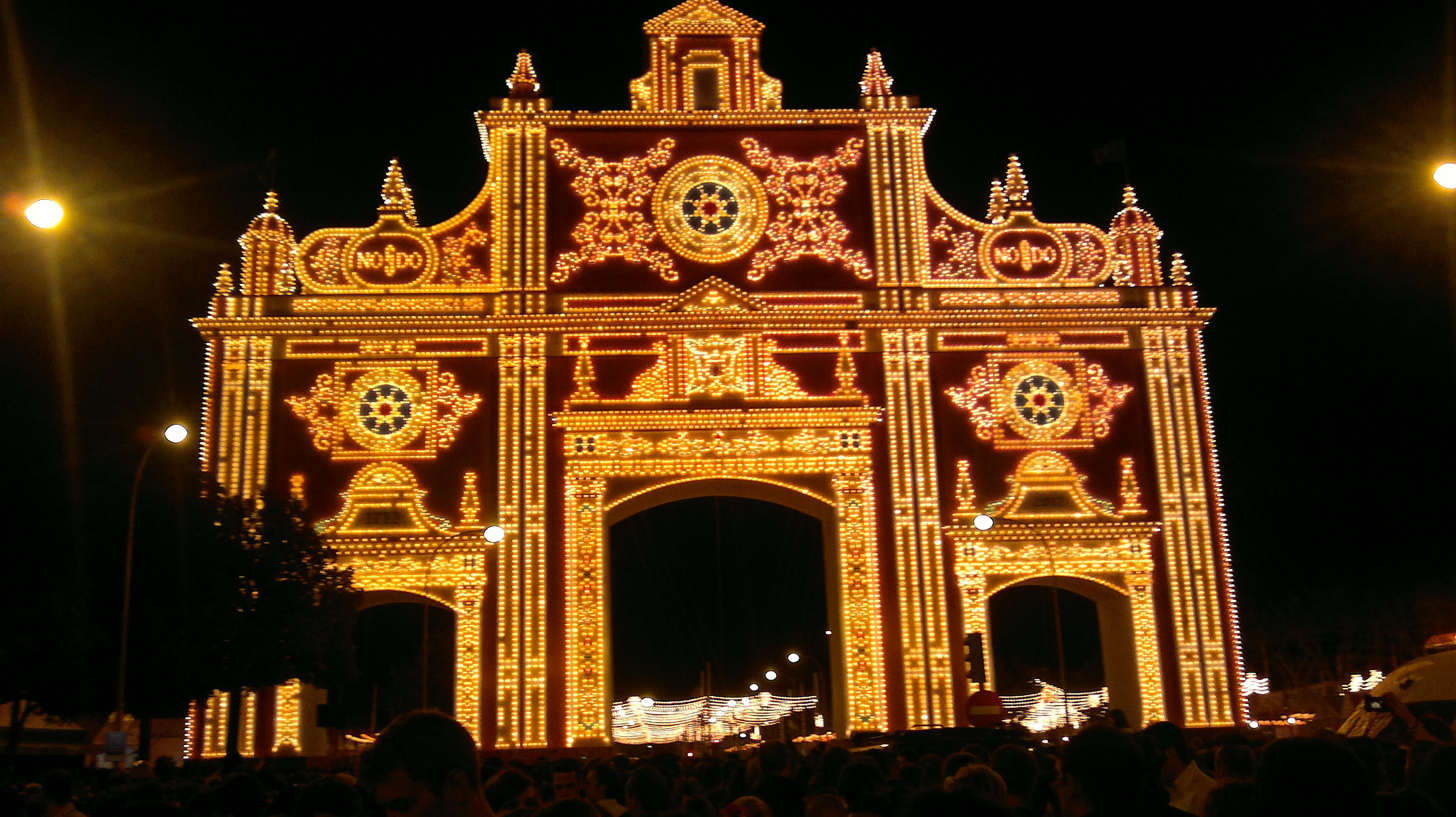
The main entrance to the Seville Fair of 2012, five minutes after the alumbrao.

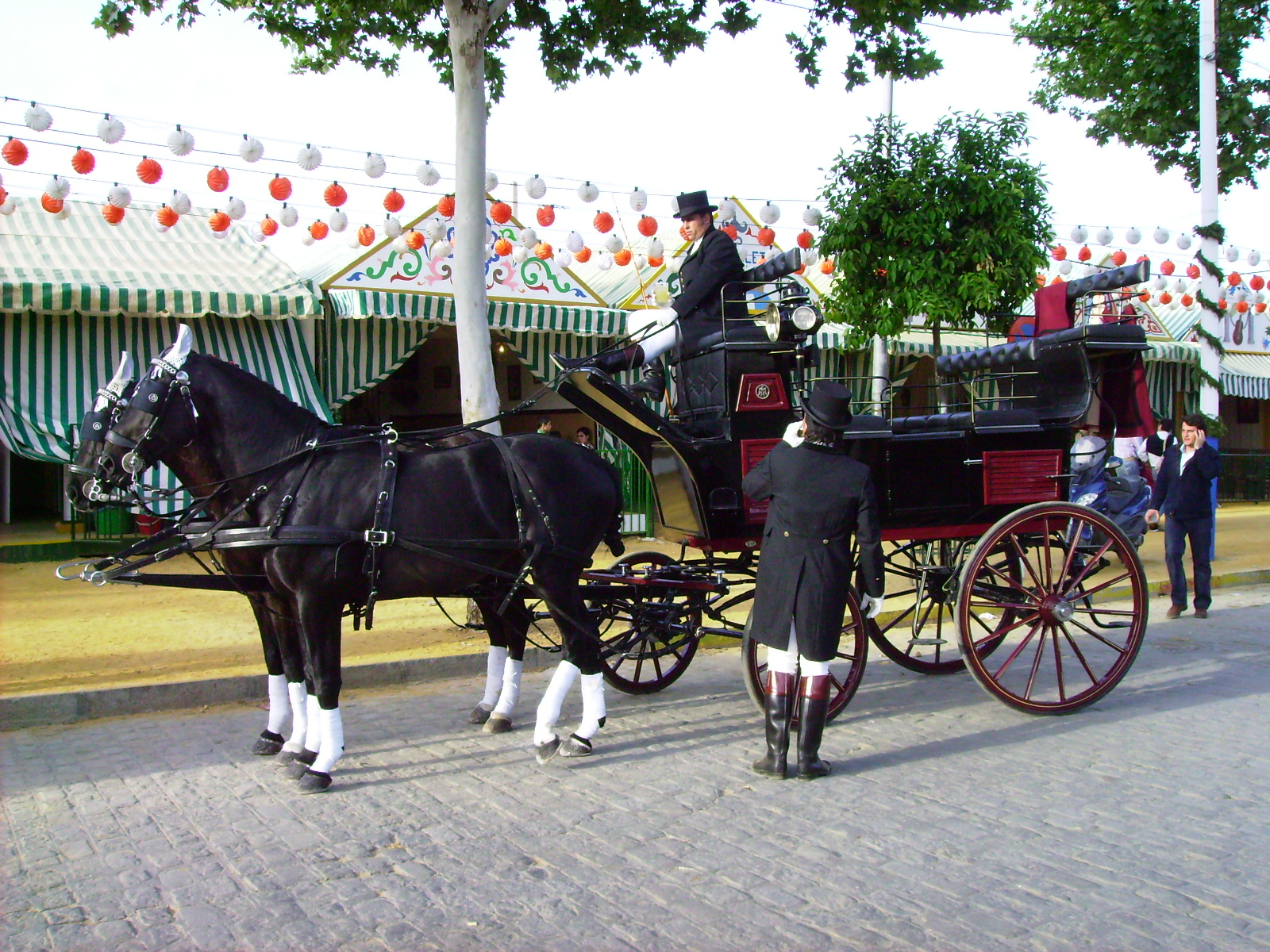
Carriage at the Seville's April Fair

Monday night in the Feria de Abril is referred to as la noche del pescaíto (night of the fish). That night, Casetas owners and friends dine fried fish together before the alumbrao.

Celebrations officially start Monday midnight (Tuesday 00:00 AM) when the lights of the portada are turned on for the first time. This event is called the alumbrao. People gather in front of the portada to watch the alumbrao and then go to the casetas to have dinner and spend the whole night at the Real.

== Future fair dates ==
The Feria de Abril happens every year two weeks after Holly Week, hence its start date varies year to year.

The 2020 Feria de Abril was scheduled from April 25 to May 2. However, on March 15, 2020, the fair was postponed to September due to the coronavirus pandemic in Spain.

== Image gallery ==
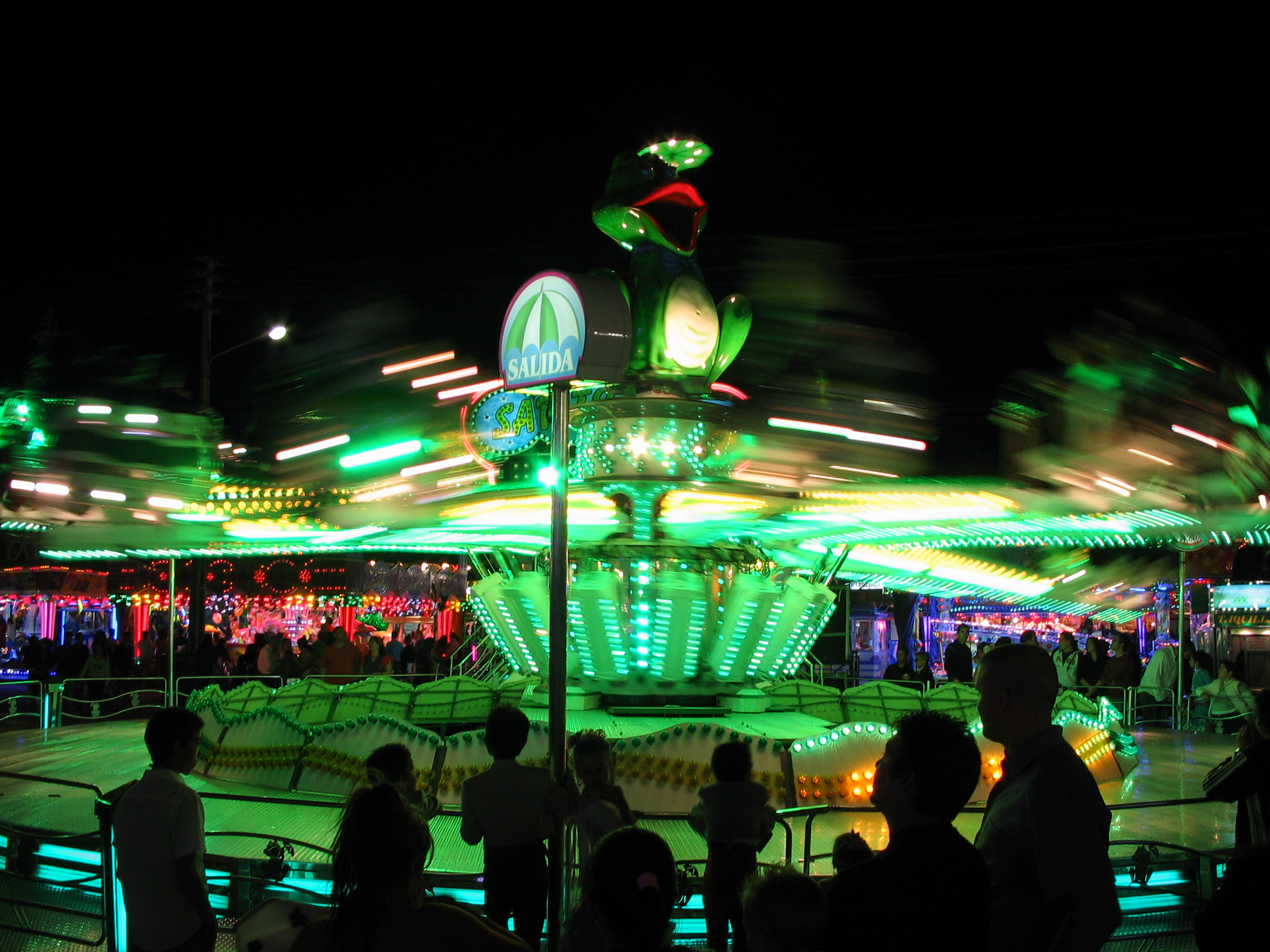
Amusement ride at the 2007 Seville Fair

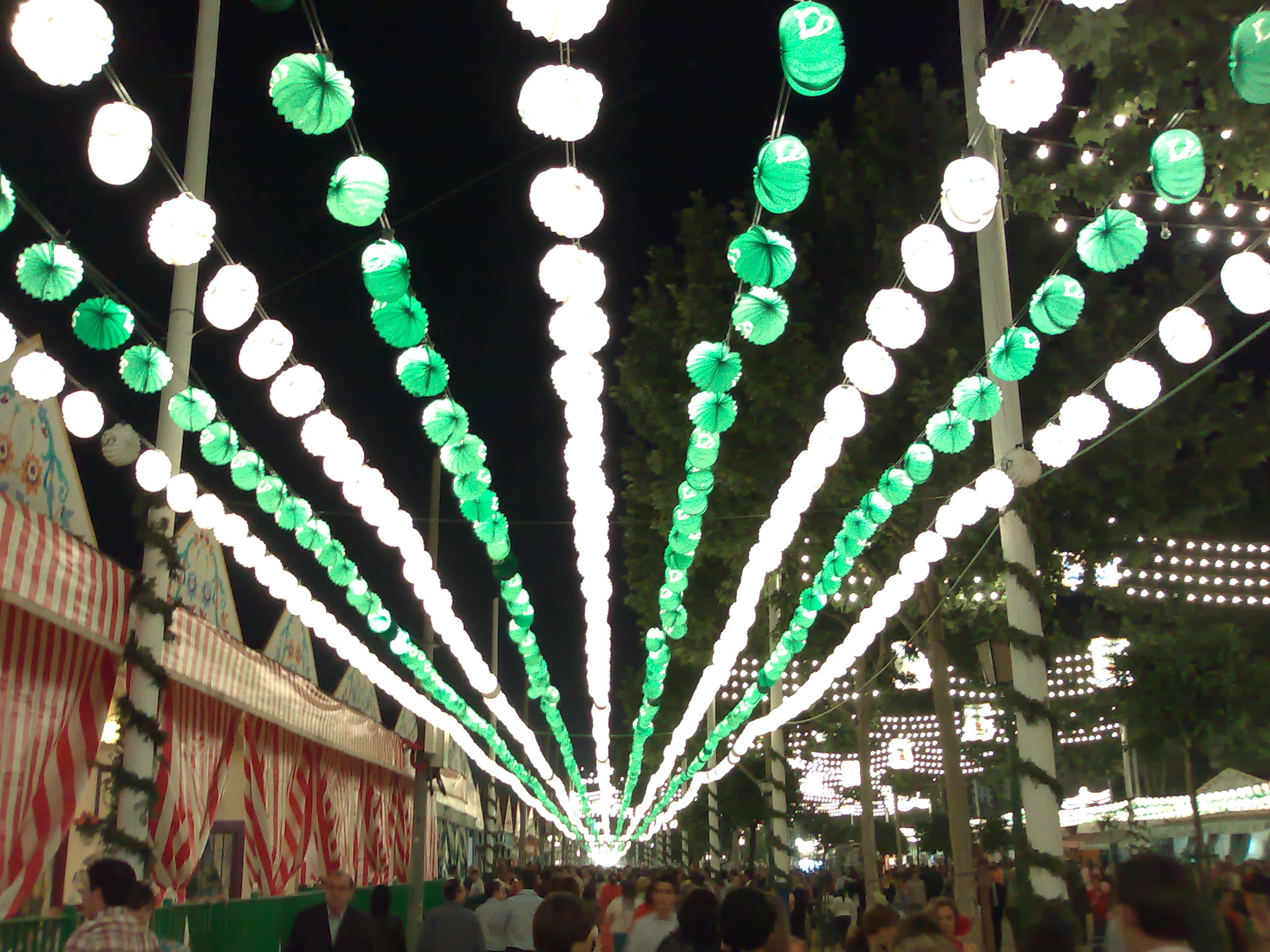
Lanterns in the 2007 Seville Fair

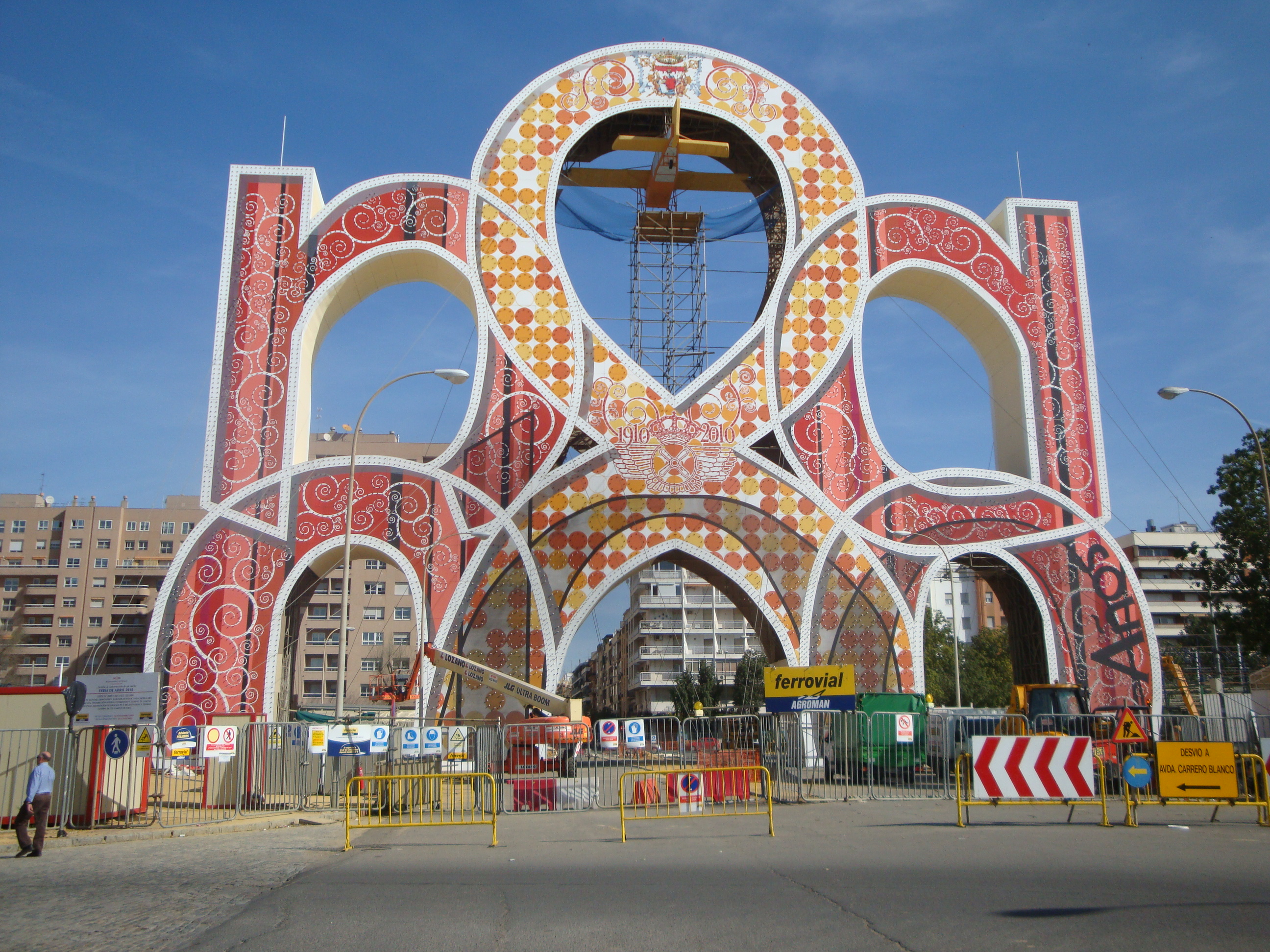
Main entrance to the Seville April Fair, 2010

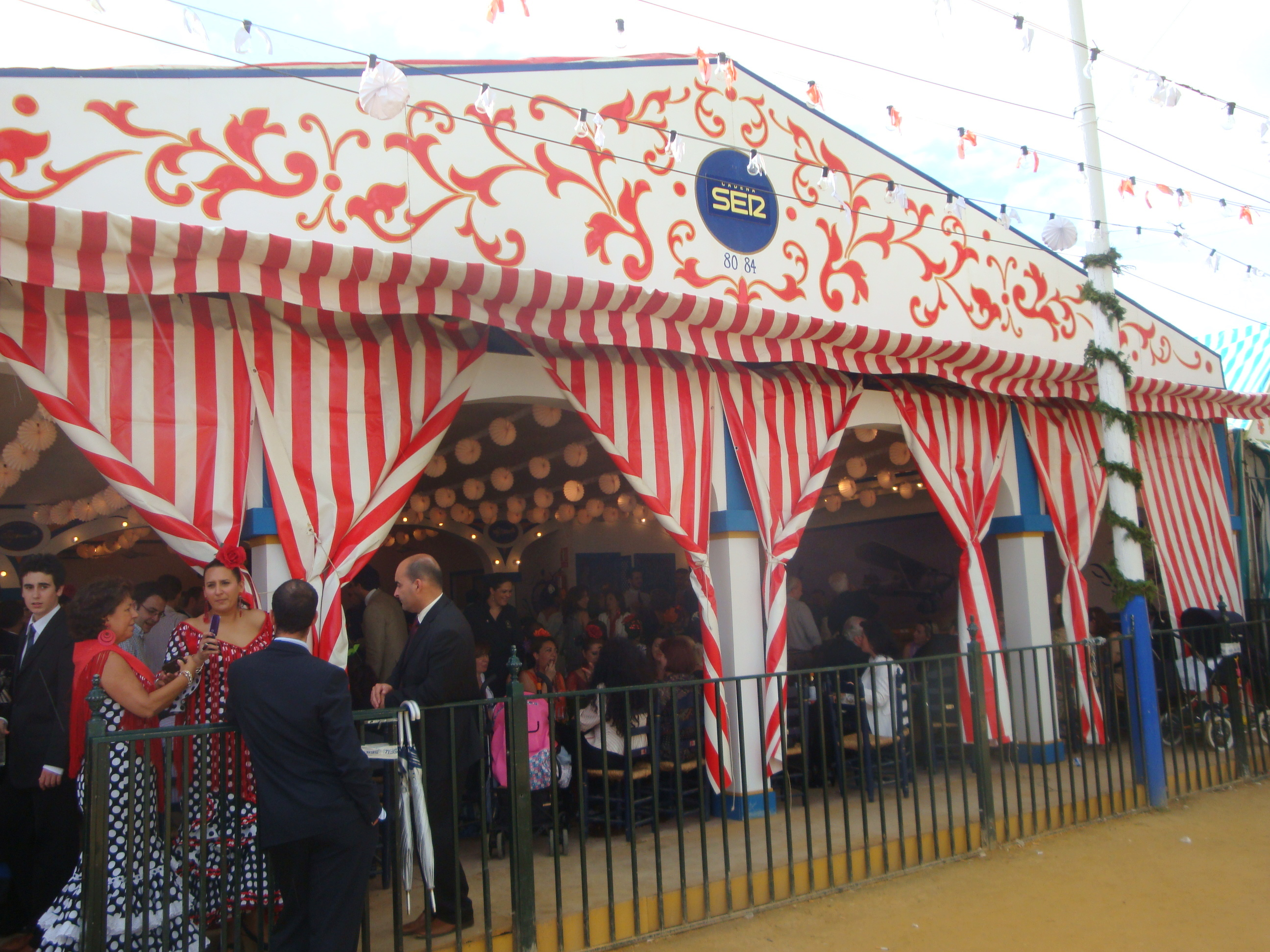
Exterior of a caseta

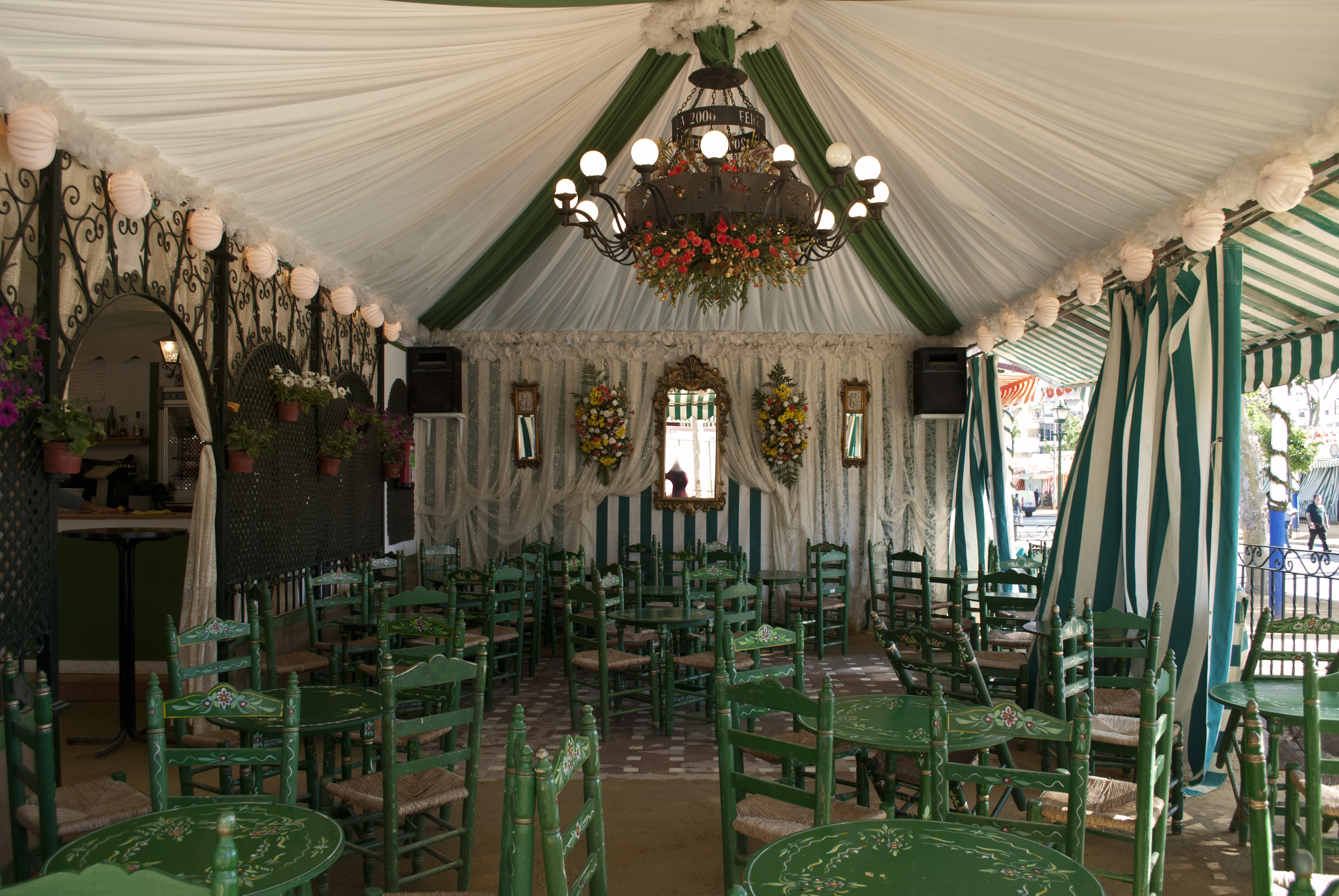
Inside a caseta
