= Letter frequency effect =

The letter frequency effect is an effect of letter frequency, according to which the frequency with which the letter is encountered influences the recognition time of a letter. Letters of high frequency show a significant advantage over letters of low frequency in letter naming, same-different matching, and visual search. Letters of high frequency are recognized faster than letters of low frequency. Appelman and Mayzner (1981) in their re-analysis of the studies concerning letter frequency effect have found that in 3 out of 6 studies using reaction times (RTs) as a dependent variable the letter frequency correlated significantly with RTs.

== Discussion ==
Majority of studies on letter frequency effect failed to find a significant letter frequency effect. These studies, however, used the same-different matching task in which the participants see two letters and are to respond if these letters are same or different. Therefore, the absence of letter frequency effect in these studies may be due to the participants using the visual form of a letter instead of a letter itself to match the letters.
