= Type case =

Compartmentalized wooden box used to store movable type used in letterpress printing

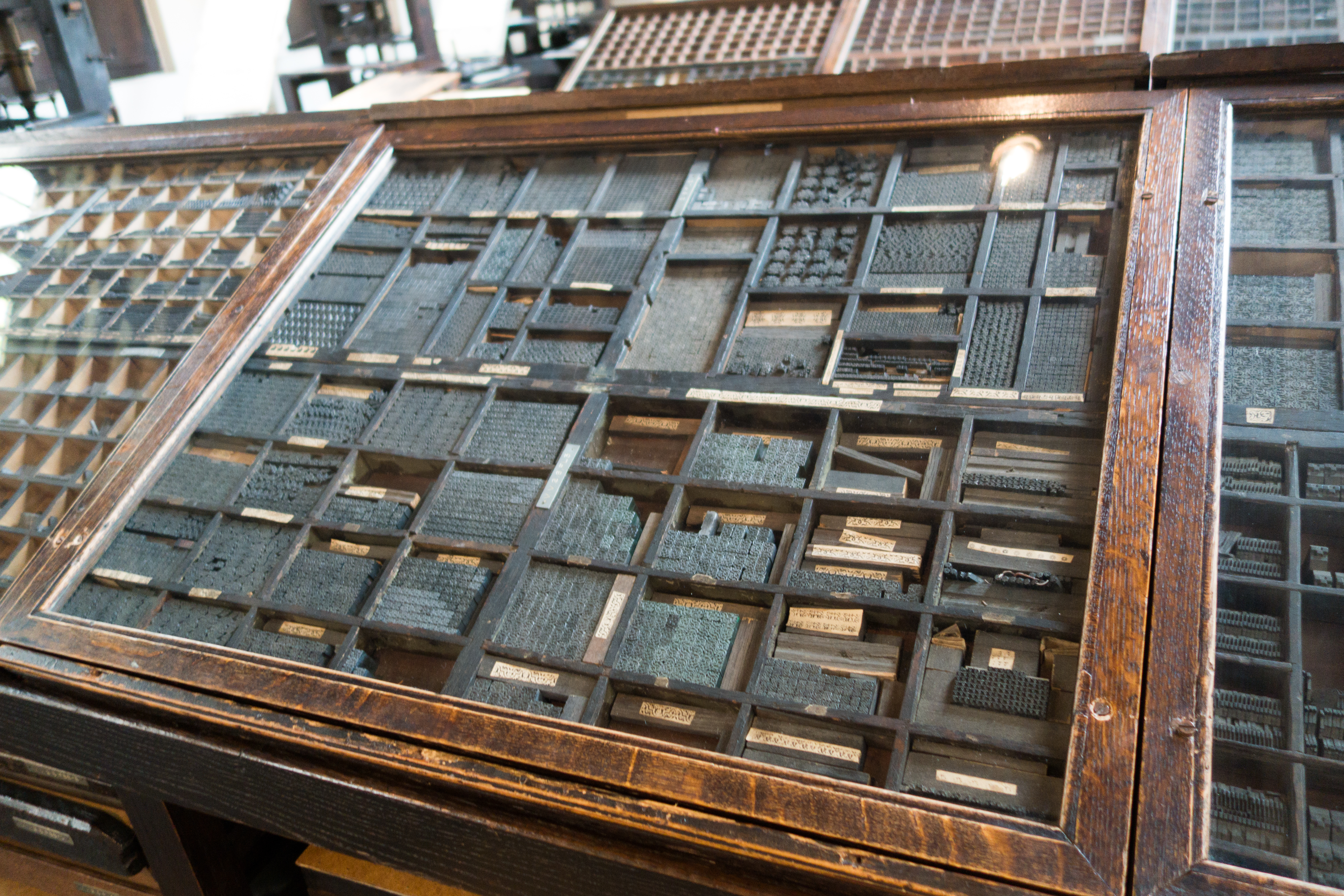
Type case

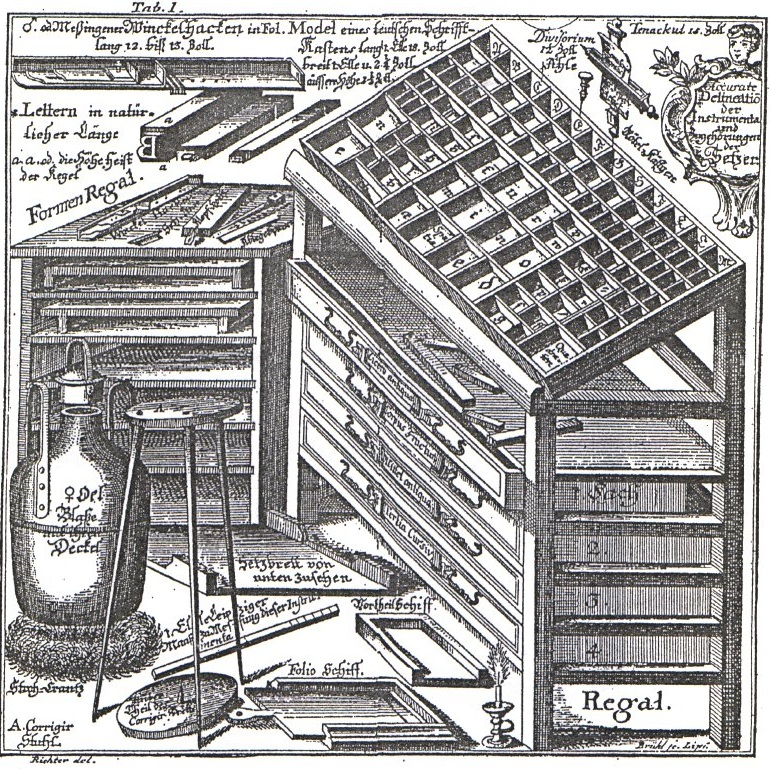
An 18th-century type case, with various tools for typesetting

A type case is a compartmentalized wooden box used to store movable type used in letterpress printing.

Modern, factory-produced movable type was available in the late nineteenth century. It was held in the printing shop in a job case, a drawer about two inches (5 cm) high, three feet (90 cm) wide, and about two feet (60 cm) deep, with many small compartments for the "sorts" (various letters and ligatures). The most popular and commonly used job case design in America was the California Job Case, which took its name from the Pacific Coast location of the foundries that made the case popular. These cases allowed type to be compactly transported.

Traditionally, the capital letters were stored in a separate drawer, or case, placed above the case holding the other letters (this is why the capital letters are called "uppercase" characters, and the minuscules are "lower case").

There were a great variety of cases, and also variations in the "lay", or the assignment of the sorts into the compartments. Different printers had different house layouts even for the same design of case.
