= A load of old cobblers =

British slang term

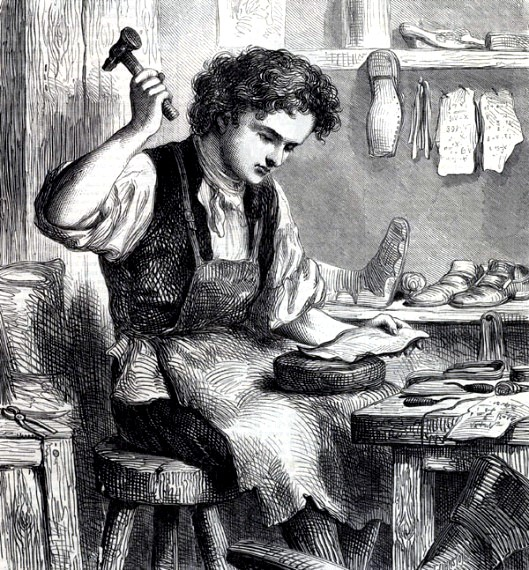
A shoemaker in 1861

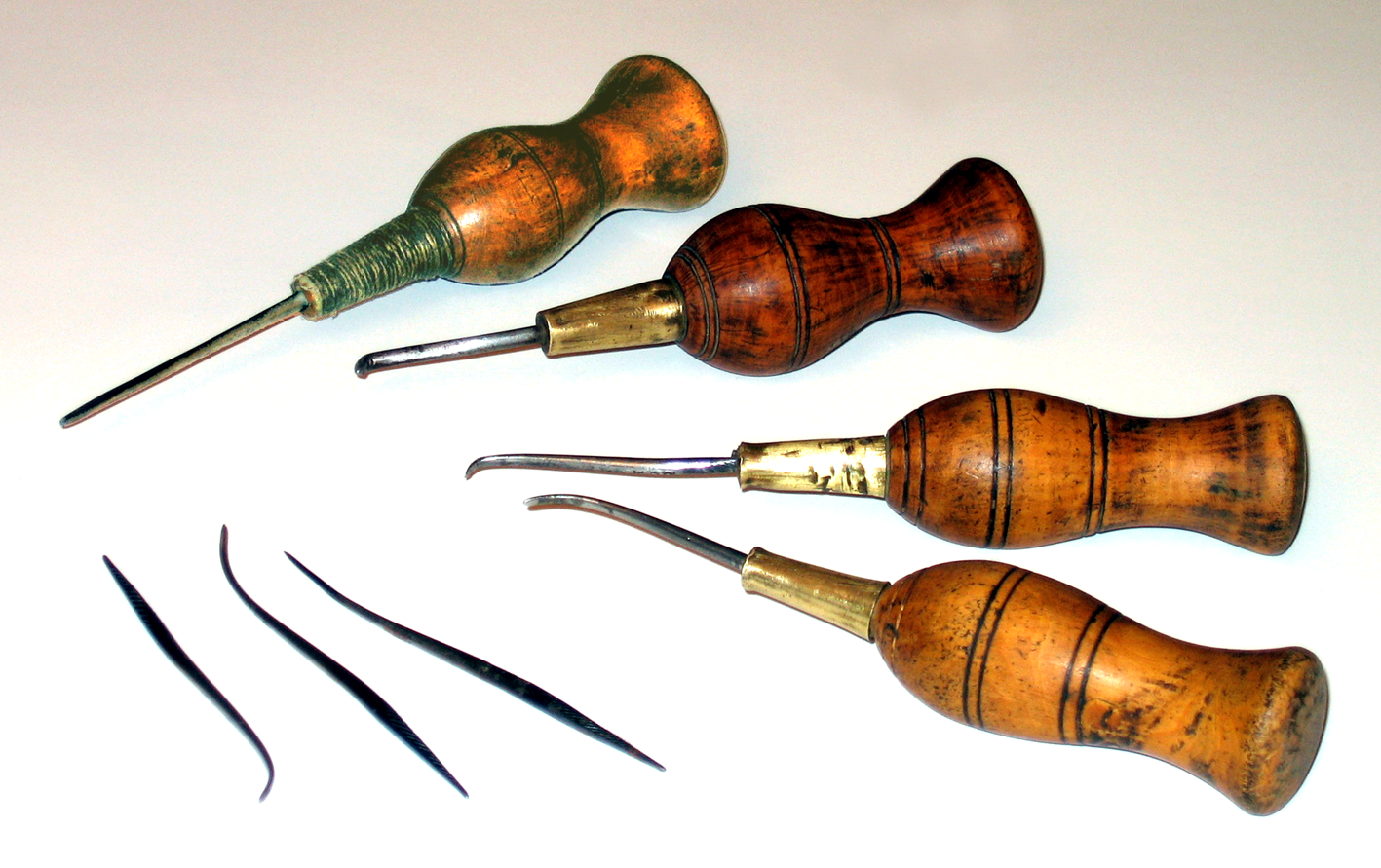
Shoemaking awls

"A load of old cobblers" and variants such as "what a load of cobblers" or just "cobblers!" is British slang for "what nonsense" that is derived from the Cockney rhyming slang for "balls" (testicles), which rhymes with "cobbler's awls". The phrase began to be widely used from the 1960s and is still in use but has become less offensive over time as its origins have been forgotten.

== Origins ==
The phrase originated as Cockney rhyming slang where "cobblers" refers to cobbler's awls which rhymes with "balls" (testicles), as in the exclamation "Balls!" for "Nonsense!". The use of the rhyme allows a taboo word, in this case the vulgar exclamation "balls!", to be avoided. The use of "cobblers" as a synonym for balls dates back to at least the 1930s.

== Contemporary use ==
The term "load of old cobblers" and similar variants only gained wide currency from the 1960s, for instance in British sitcoms such as Steptoe and Son (1962–74) which featured two rag-and-bone men based in west London. It has also been exported to Australia and other countries to which the British have migrated and according to Collins became popular with the tabloid press.

Eric Partridge and his successors mention that the phrase and its cousin "cobblers to you!" is often used by people unaware of its vulgar origins and has become less offensive. Partridge suggests that a comparison with "cod's wallop" (complete rubbish) is inevitable.

In 2016, Sir James Dyson said that concerns that Britain's international trade would be damaged by Brexit were "absolute cobblers". The Guardian used the phrase in 2018 to describe comments made by the sports coach Eddie Jones, saying "Nice try, Eddie, but what a load of old cobblers." In February 2019, The Times used it in a comparison of beauty products, saying "Whether or not you think crystals are a load of old cobblers, I guarantee you'll fall hook line and sinker ..." It has also been used as a pun in a headline after builders covered cobbles with asphalt.

In the TV series Yes Minister, the term was used in the episode "Equal Opportunities" where the characters are describing what code to use on a letter - "CGSM. It stands for Consignment of Geriatric Shoe Manufacturers. Load of old cobblers, Minister."

== See also ==
- Bollocks
