= California job case =

Case with compartments to store the movable type used in letterpress printing

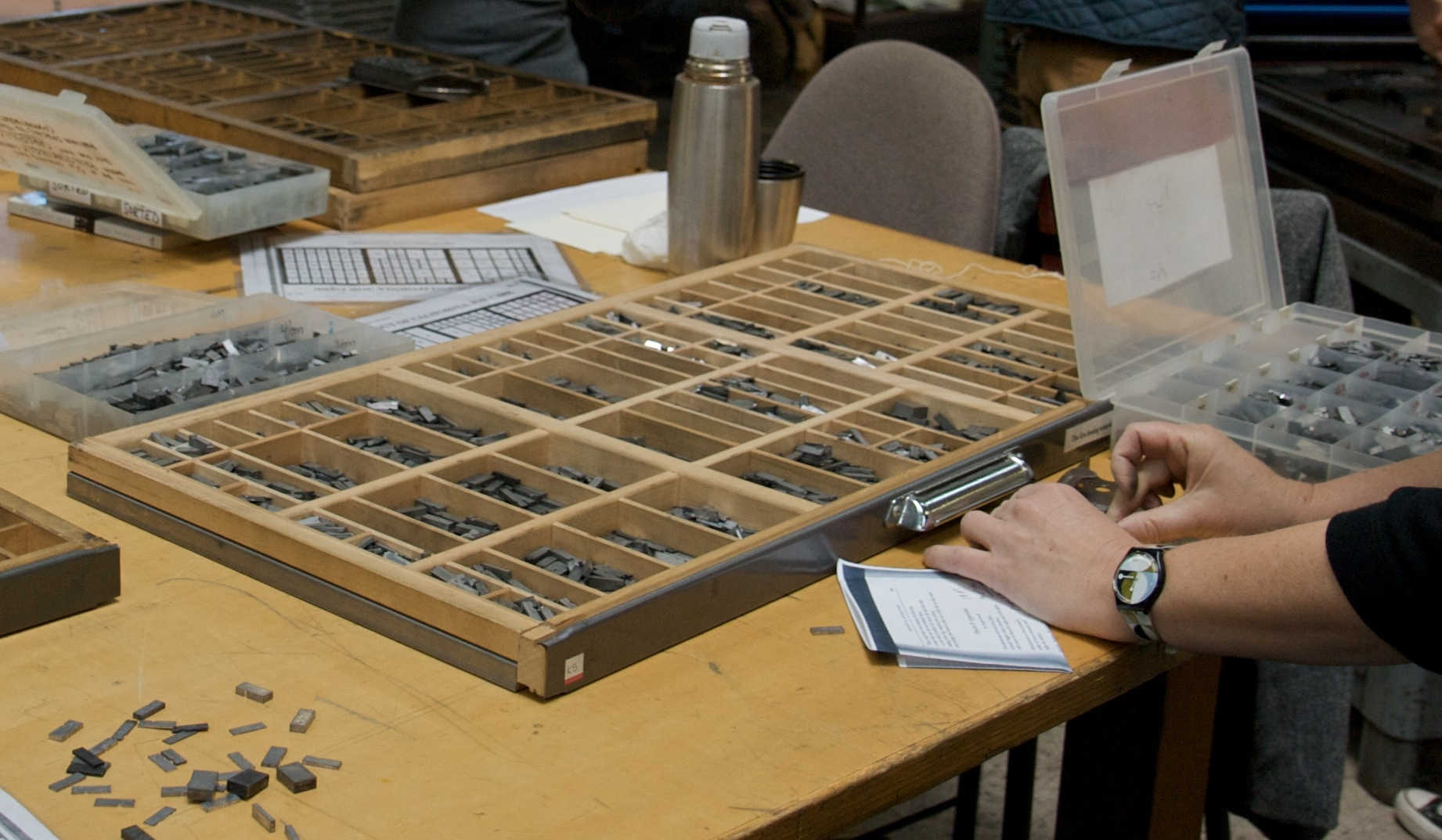
A California job case

A California job case is a kind of type case: a compartmentalized wooden box used to store movable type used in letterpress printing. It was the most popular and accepted of the job case designs in America. The California job case took its name from the Pacific Coast location of the foundries that made the case popular.

The defining characteristic of the California job case is the layout, documented by J. L. Ringwalt in the American Encyclopaedia of Printing in 1871, as used by San Francisco printers. This modification of a previously popular case, the Italic, it was claimed reduced the compositor's hand travel as he set the pieces of type into his composing stick by more than half a mile per day. In the previous convention, upper- and lowercase type were kept in separate cases, or trays. This is why capital letters are called uppercase and the minuscules are lowercase. The combined case became popular during the western expansion of the United States in the 19th century.

== Layout ==
A California job case consists of 89 compartments, most of which are assigned to specific letters, spacers, ligatures and quads. In variations on the layout, additional symbols are sorted in the unassigned compartments at the top of the case.

ffi	fl	5/m	4/m	’	k	e	1	2	3	4	5	6	7	8	$	£	–	Æ	Œ	æ	œ
j	b	c		d		e	i		s		f	g	ff	9	A	B	C	D	E	F	G
?	b	c		d		e	i		s		f	g	fi	0	H	I	K	L	M	N	O
!	l	m		n		h	o		y	p	w	,	en qd	em qd	H	I	K	L	M	N	O
z	l	m		n		h	o		y	p	w	,	en qd	em qd	P	Q	R	S	T	V	W
x	v	u		t		3/em spaces	a		r		;	:	2 & 3-em quads		P	Q	R	S	T	V	W
q	v	u		t		3/em spaces	a		r		.	-	2 & 3-em quads		X	Y	Z	J	U	&	ffl
The California job case

Minuscule (lowercase) letters, punctuation and spaces of various widths are on the left; capital (uppercase) letters are on the right, and numerals and some other symbols are at the top. The position and size of the compartments for lowercase letters vary according to the frequency of occurrence of the letters. The compartments for uppercase letters are uniform in size and ordered from A to Z, except for J and U, which were not used by early English printers, so they are assigned compartments following Z.

This organization keeps larger quantities of the more frequently used letters in convenient reach of the typesetter, with ligatures and spaces of different widths nearby to improve efficiency.

Each size and style of typeface is kept in its own tray (case), and trays are kept in a cabinet with slots making each tray a removable drawer. The cabinet may offer the typesetter a work surface at a convenient height, such as in a composer's work stand.

Regardless of who invented the case, in order to make typesetting more efficient, the inventor arranged the compartments according to the frequency of use of the letters. The more frequently used letters (t, n, e, i, o, r) are arranged in a rough circle directly in front of the typesetter; the less frequently used letters and characters are farther away. The arrangement of the letters in the California job case became so common that a skilled typesetter could "read" the text set by another typesetter, just by watching the typesetter remove type from the case, seeing from which compartments the letters were taken.

In addition to placing the letters most commonly used in the easiest positions for the typesetter to reach, the compartments for different characters vary in size according to the frequency of usage. Thus, for setting English text, the "e" box is the largest, and the "j", "k", "q", "x", and "z" boxes are the smallest.

Other large compartments in the California job case hold spaces used to separate words or to fill out lines of type, including em and en spaces. An em space has the width of the point size of the type (i.e., as wide as it is high); an en space has half that width (i.e., half as wide as it is high; in most types, the numerals have the same width as an en space, to allow easy alignment of numerical data in columns). Typically, a 3-to-em space is used between words (three of these spaces placed side by side have the width of an em space).
