= Sherry cobbler =

American cocktail with sherry

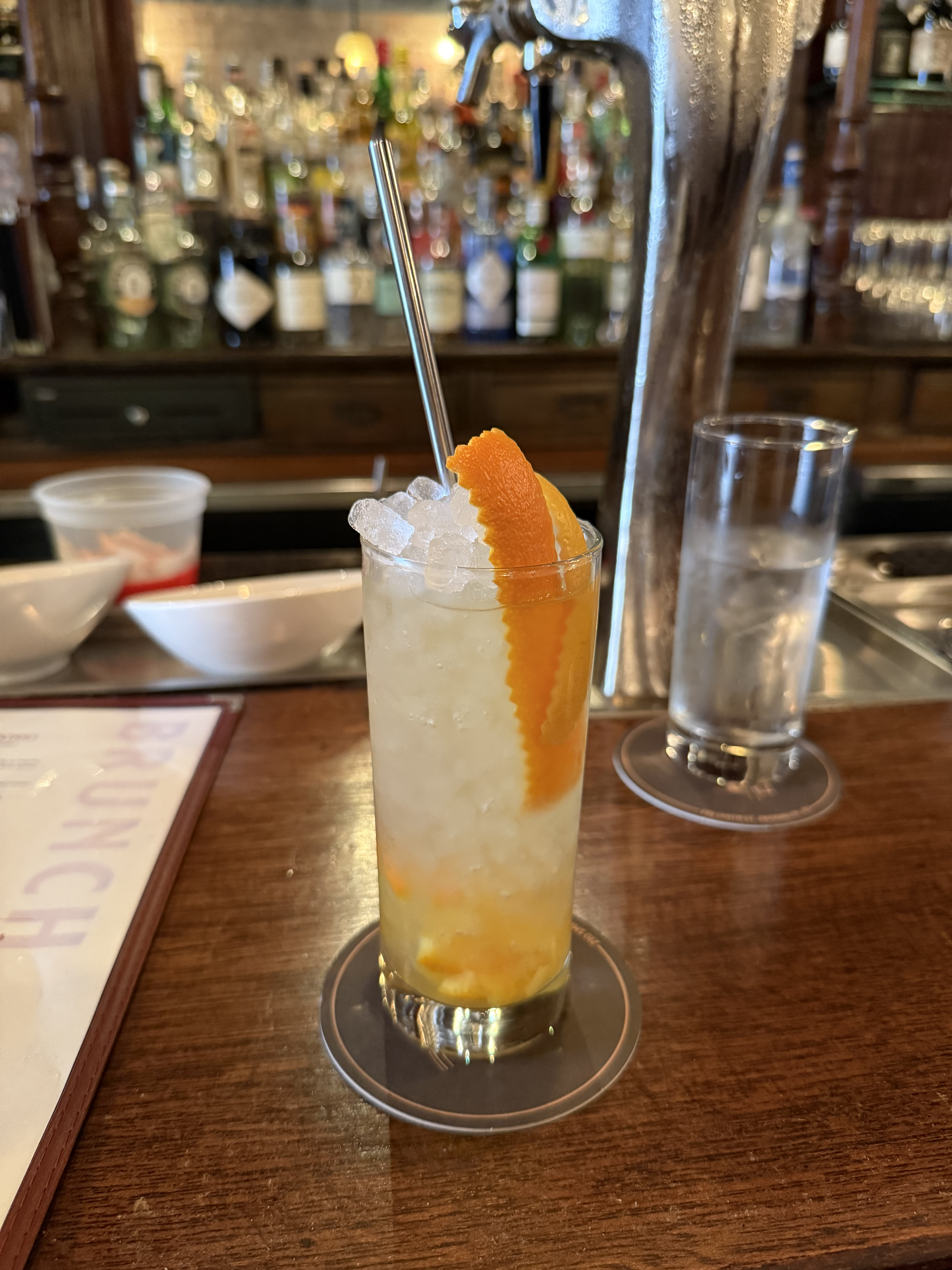
- Type: Cocktail
- Ingredients: 45 ml amontillado sherry; 45 ml Palo Cortado sherry; 1 tsp sugar; 1/2 orange wheel; 1/2 lemon wheel
- Base spirit: Sherry
- Standard drinkware: Highball glass
- Standard garnish: Fresh berries, lemon zest, orange zest
- Served: On the rocks: poured over ice
- Preparation: Combine ingredients in a shaker with ice, shake, and pour over a glass filled with crushed ice.

A sherry cobbler is a classic American cocktail made with sherry, sugar and citrus. Its origins are not known in detail, but is believed to have originated sometime in the early 19th century. The earliest known mention is from an 1838 diary of a Canadian traveler to the United States, Katherine Jane Ellice, but it did not gain international name recognition until Charles Dickens included the drink in The Life and Adventures of Martin Chuzzlewit.

To make the drink, orange and lemon are muddled with simple syrup, sherry is added, and the mixture is shaken with ice in a cocktail shaker and strained into a highball glass filled with crushed ice. Garnishes include mint leaves, raspberry, and orange and lemon slices. It can also be garnished with pineapple wedges or any seasonal berries. Some recipes add pineapple juice.

== History ==
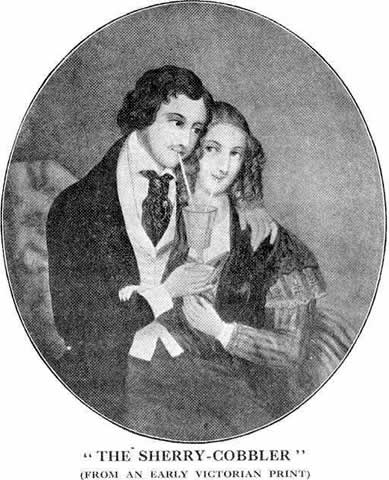
"Early Victorian print" showing a couple sharing a sherry cobbler through drinking straws

The Sherry Cobbler emerged during the 1830s and became one of the most popular mixed drinks in the 19th century United States. The invention of the drinking straw around this time made crushed ice drinks like the Sherry Cobbler more convenient. The earliest known reference to a "Cobbler" dates the diary of Canadian traveler Katherine Jane Ellice. It was included in the first book that is known to be specifically for bartenders, that is Jerry Thomas' 1862 edition of The Bartender's Guide. This original recipe is made with just three ingredients:

- 2 wine glasses sherry
- 1 tbsp sugar
- 2 or 3 slices of orange

The popularity of Sherry Cobbler inspired many spinoff drinks like the Champagne Cobbler, Claret Cobbler, and Whiskey Cobbler. In 1888, Harry Johnson wrote "This drink is without doubt the most popular beverage in this country, with ladies as well as with gentlemen," but like many classic cocktails their popularity fades after Prohibition.

A 19th-century recipe for Fourth of July Sherry cobbler is made with strawberries, lemon peel, powdered sugar and sherry.

== Variations ==
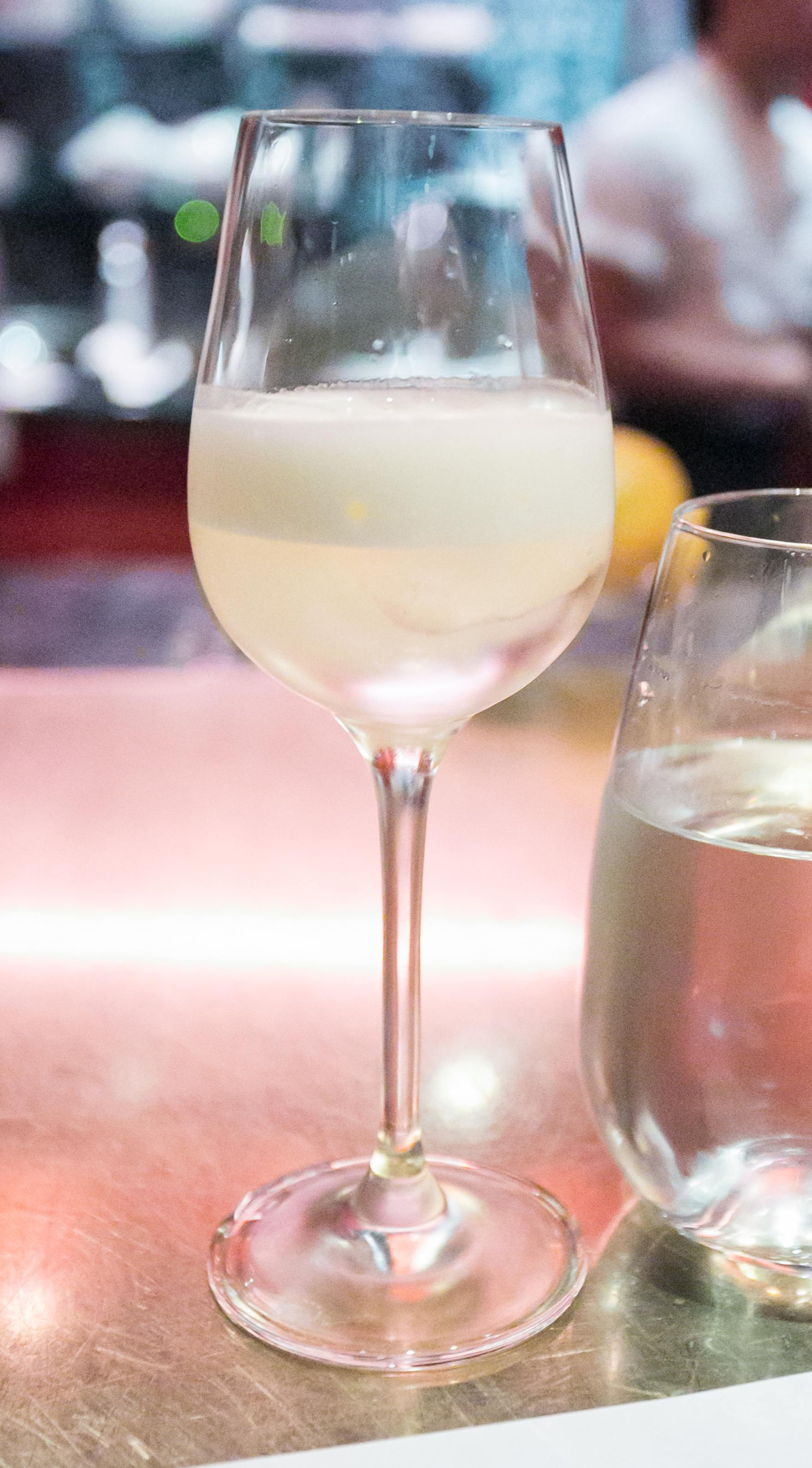
A rebujito

Rebujito is a similar Andalusian drink made by combining sherry and a soft drink, typically white lemonade or lemon-lime soda.

Classic cobblers didn't include muddled fruits but the popularity of the Sherry Cobbler inspired the creation of more elaborate cobblers.

The King's Cobbler was made with rhubarb amaro called Zucca rabarbaro instead of fortified wine. Other ingredients were muddled strawberry, fresh lemon juice and simple syrup, with a mint leaf garnish.

Champagne cobbler is made with muddled pineapple, lemon and orange with Maraschino liqueur and Champagne in a 1:4 ratio.
