= Rainbow Cobblers =

Retail shoe store in San Francisco, US

- Location: 780 Columbus Avenue, North Beach, San Francisco, California, United States
- Coordinates: 37.801850°N 122.412623°W
- Opening date: 1971
- Closing date: December 1974
- Owner: Bruce Smith; Howard Z. Fuchs
- Goods sold: shoe maker, retail shoe store
- Interactive map of Rainbow Cobblers

Rainbow Cobblers was a 1970s shoe maker and retail shoe store in the North Beach neighborhood of San Francisco, California, U.S.. They were known for "exotic" hippie-style boots, often with patchwork, or appliqué. They crafted bespoke, one-of-a-kind boots, often using traditional techniques, and were considered wearable art by many. A second location was in Los Angeles, California.

== History ==
The business was owned by Borogrove, Inc. and co-founded by Bruce Smith. Smith was from Pennsylvania and was in the shoe sales business prior. It was headquartered at 780 Columbus Avenue (now 785), at Greenwich Street; and had a second location in Los Angeles. Many of the Rainbow Cobblers employees in San Francisco were master craftsmen from El Salvador. Rainbow Cobblers were able to make custom shoes like extra small sizes, extra tall boots, or for specific uses like dancing, police work, theatre or orthopedic shoes.

The boots were popular and sold to musicians, bands, and activists, including Three Dog Night, Buddy Miles, the Grateful Dead, Black Oak Arkansas, Bobby Seale, and Huey P. Newton.

== Legacy ==
Rainbow Cobblers were part of the exhibition "The Summer of Love Experience: Art, Fashion, and Rock & Roll," (2017) at the De Young Museum in San Francisco.

A pair of men's patchwork boots (1972), and a pair of women's boots called the "Sequoia" boots (c. 1970s) are part of the collection at the Fine Arts Museums of San Francisco. Rainbow Cobblers are also part of the collection at the Bata Shoe Museum in Toronto, Canada.

== See also ==
- Anti-globalization movement
- Psychedelia
