= Compound point =

Obsolete typographical construction

Semicolon dash
;—
- A more emphatic or longer semicolon

The compound point is an obsolete typographical construction. Keith Houston reported that this form of punctuation doubling, which involved the comma dash ,— , the semicolon dash ;— , the colon dash or "dog's bollocks" :— , and less often the stop-dash .— , arose in the seventeenth century, citing examples from as early as 1622 (in an edition of Othello). More traditionally, these paired forms of punctuation seem most often to have been called (generically) compound points and (specifically) the comma dash, semicolon dash, colon dash, and point dash.

Stop dash
.—
- A full stop that emphasises the sentence it starts

Comma dash
,—
- A mark used in various ways: to mark parentheticals that are placed where a comma would otherwise be needed in the principal sentence; to mark an idea repeated in different words; as a more emphatic comma; or for separating several clauses with a common dependence from the clause on which they depend.

Colon dash
:—
- A mark that indicates a list, the contents of which start on the next line; or as a more emphatic colon

== Function ==
Houston, in his book Shady Characters: The Secret Life of Punctuation, Symbols, and Other Typographical Marks, suggests that the demise of this form of punctuation may be due to the emergence of hostile style guides:

The Chicago Manual of Style, launched in 1906, ruled against the dash hybrids from the start—except, curiously enough, the stop-dash, which was permitted only to introduce notes or asides, as in the construction "NOTE.—", though this too had been expunged by the 1969 edition. "Compound points" such as the commash were tolerated for slightly longer in British English, though by 1953 the British lexicographer Eric Partridge had also concluded "You [should] use compound points only when they are unavoidable."

A note in Mechanical Translation and Computational Linguistics, volumes 4–5 (1957) indicates that compound points were not altogether unheard of even at that date:

The present analysis will include all those punctuational patterns which are commonly found in normal technical language. Included marks are the period, comma, semi-colon, colon, question mark, exclamation point, quotation mark, parenthesis, and dash. Excluded will be the hyphen, apostrophe, asterisk, multiple dashes, dots, compound points (such as comma dash, colon dash, etc.), and oblique stroke. These punctuation marks are not included in the present analysis because their influence on the sentence structure of scientific texts is believed to be small, either because of the special nature of these punctuation marks, or because of their comparative infrequency in scientific texts.

=== Comma dash ,— ===
This construction has more rules applied to it than the other constructions. In Pens and Types: Or, Hints and Helps for Those who Write, Print, Or Read, the following was said of the comma dash:

The dash is used with the comma, the semicolon, and the colon, which it lengthens, or renders more emphatic. Several clauses having a common dependence, are separated by a comma and dash from the clause on which they depend.

"To think that we have mastered the whole problem of existence; that we have discovered the secret of creation; that we have solved the problem of evil, and abolished mystery from nature and religion and life,—leads naturally to a precipitation of action, a summary dealing with evils, etc."

If a parenthetical clause is inserted where a comma is required in the principal sentence, a comma should be placed before each of the dashes enclosing such clause.

"I should like to undertake the Stonyshire side of that estate,—it's in a dismal condition,—and set improvements on foot."

An equivalent expression, or an idea repeated in different words, is properly set off by the comma and dash.

"These are detached thoughts,—memoranda for future use."

"Wolsey's return to power was discussed openly as a probability,—a result which Ann Boleyn never ceased to fear."

=== Semicolon dash ;— ===
The semicolon dash functions as a standard semicolon; the dash is used for emphasis and pause length. As such, the semicolon dash is grammatically a semicolon, but one with more emphasis or length.

=== Colon dash :— ===
The colon dash functions as a standard colon, or to indicate a restful pause. It was often used for lists and quoted extracts that started on the next line. This was the case because a lone colon can be easily missed.

The colon dash construction has sometimes been called a dog's bollocks or dog's ballocks, for its phallic appearance. This name appeared at least as early as 1949, as cited by the Oxford English Dictionary and etymologist Eric Partridge.

=== Stop dash .— ===
The stop dash was used for note constructions, but it was also used to add emphasis to a sentence entirely. As print broker Robert Charles Lee stated: "The idea is to impart the feeling that the narrator is like pointing a finger in a determined manner at 'this thing' under discussion. Or like thumping your fingers on the desk to make your point."

== Demise of compound points ==
What seemed fundamental to good reading in 1839 seemed superfluous to critics less than a century later, at least in the case of comma-dash combinations. From Hugh Paterson, Style Manual for Stenographers, Reporters and Correspondents (1903):

The comma and dash is used instead of parenthesis:

He planned,—but his planning was often in vain,—that his dream be realized.

The combination of the comma and dash, as in the preceding example, is a hybrid. The object of adding two marks is to widen the separation; but there is no utility in this, for the comma, dash, and parenthesis perform, mainly, the same office, the enclosing of expressions that might be left out and the sense of the sentence be complete. Each represents a greater degree of separation, in the order named, so that, if the dash be not strong enough, the parenthesis may be used.

The continued use of compound points eventually fell into doubt, especially as the timing theory of proper punctuation began losing ground to the sense argument. Benjamin Drew, in Pens and Types: Or, Hints and Helps for Those who Write, Print, Or Read (1872), notes with approval the rise of this rival theory:

We have been often told, that the period denotes the longest pause; the colon, a pause one half of the length of the period; the semicolon, a pause one half the length of the colon; the comma, a pause one half the length of the semicolon, etc.; but as Greene remarks, "Points are used to mark the sense, rather than the pauses."
