= Sherry vinegar =

Gourmet wine vinegar made from sherry

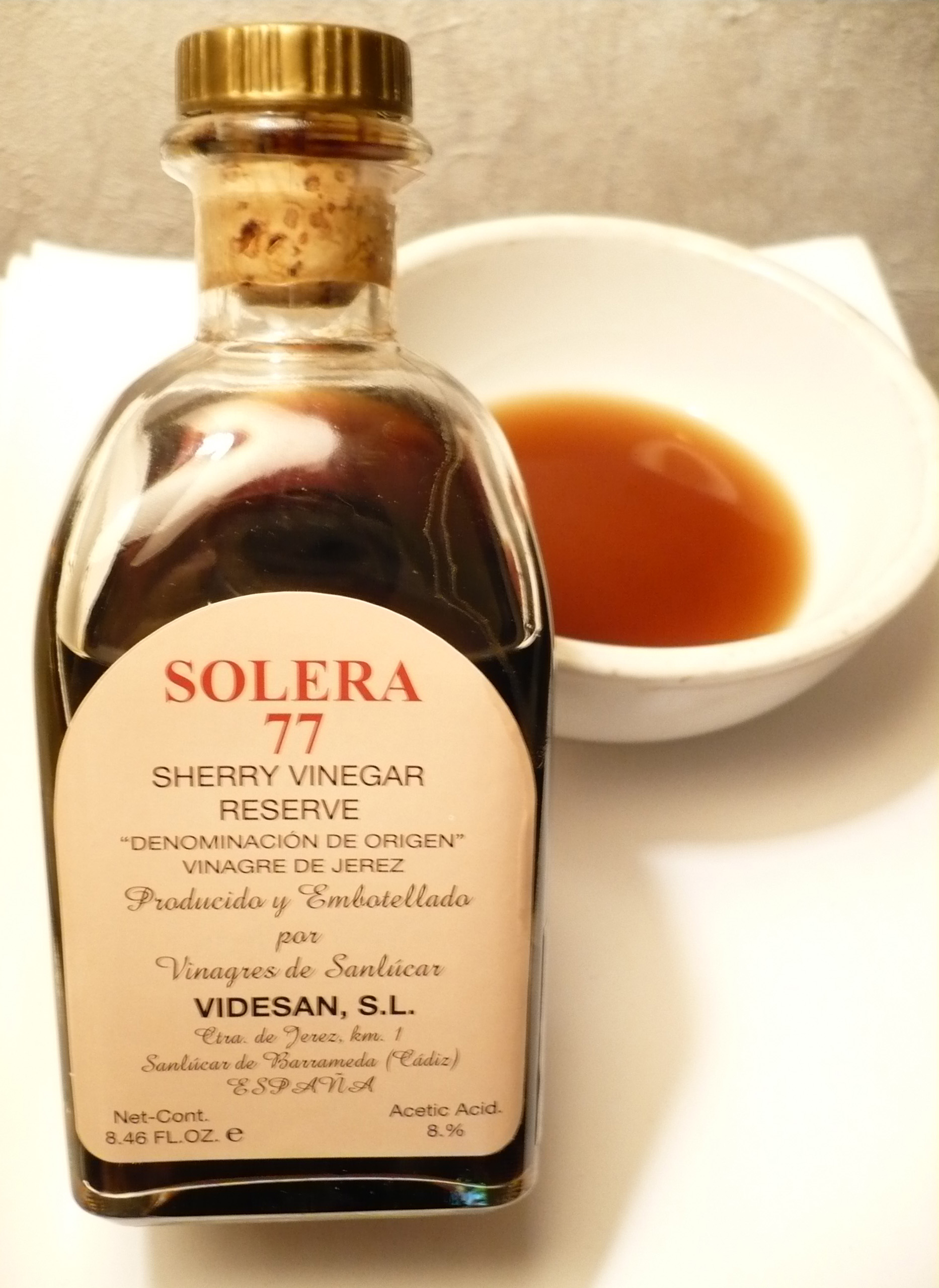
A bottle and bowl of sherry vinegar produced in Sanlúcar de Barrameda

Sherry vinegar (Spanish: vinagre de Jerez) is a gourmet wine vinegar made from sherry. It is produced in the Spanish province of Cádiz and inside the triangular area between the city of Jerez de la Frontera and towns of Sanlúcar de Barrameda and El Puerto de Santa María, known as the "sherry triangle".

In the USA, to be called vinagre de Jerez, by law the sherry vinegar must undergo ageing in American oak for a minimum of six months, can only be aged within the "sherry triangle" and must have a minimum of 7 degrees acidity. Most sherry vinegars are aged using the same solera system as the sherry wines and Brandy de Jerez.

The production and quality of sherry vinegar is monitored and controlled by the Consejo Regulador and sherry vinegar has its own Denominación de Origen and protected designation of origin (Denominación de Origen Protegida), which is protected by Spanish and EU law. The only other vinegars with similar protected designation of origin are "Aceto Balsamico Tradizionale" from Modena and Reggio Emilia in Italy and "Condado de Huelva" and "Montilla-Moriles" in Spain.

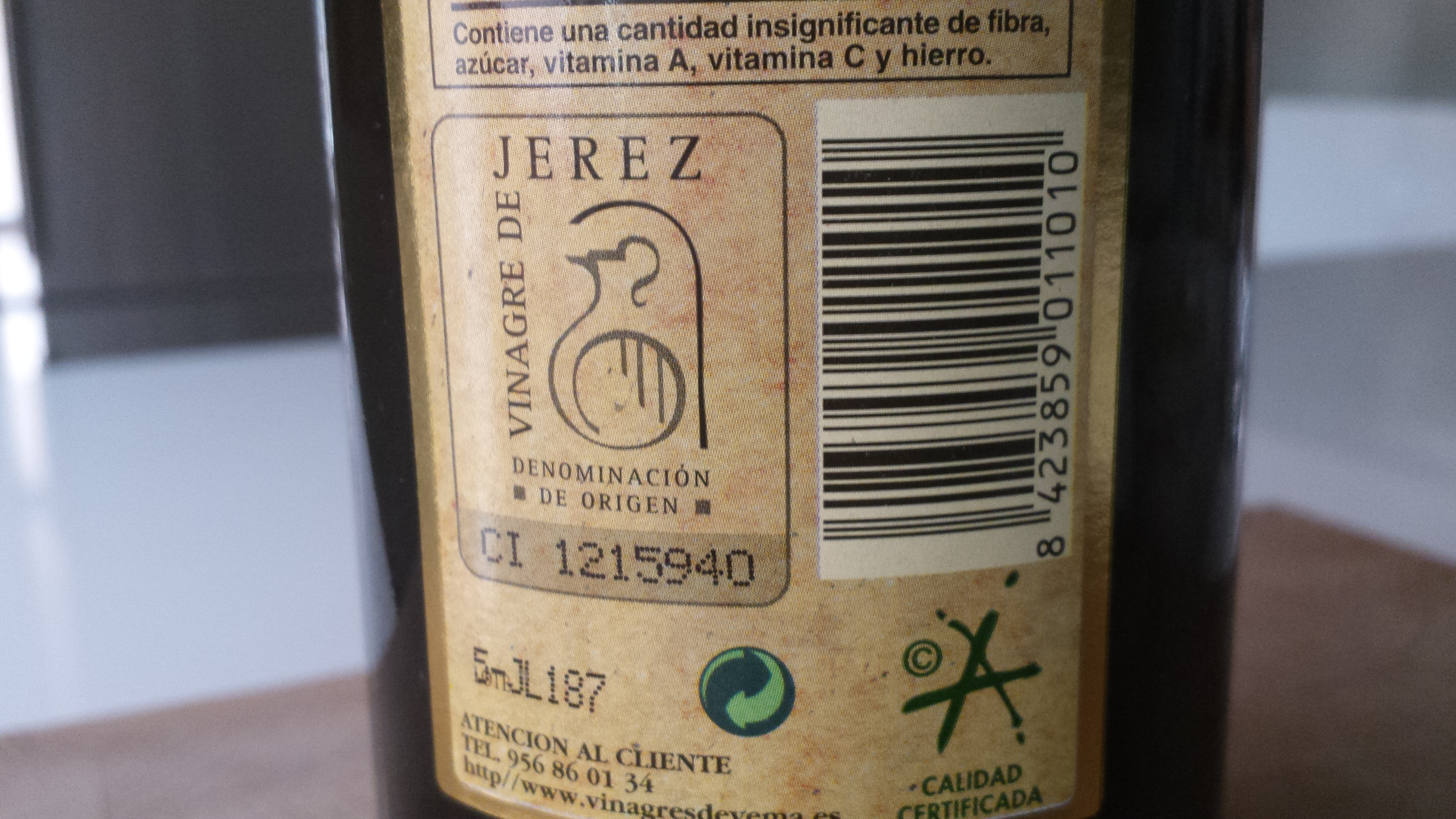
DO Vinagre de Jerez

== Age Categories ==
- Vinagre de Jerez has a minimum of 6 months aging in wood.
- Vinagre de Jerez Reserva has a minimum of 2 years aging in wood.
- Vinagre de Jerez Gran Reserva is a new category with a minimum of 10 years aging in wood.

== Styles ==
The style of sherry vinegar depends mainly on the grape variety used to produce the wine it is made from.

- Palomino: Most sherry vinegar is produced from wines which were made from the Palomino grape. The wine being used to produce the vinegar can be young wine or can be a wine which has already aged.
- al Pedro Ximénez: Wines produced from the Pedro Ximénez grape are usually sweet, often very sweet, and consequently the vinegars produced from these wines are usually sweeter than other sherry vinegars or at the very least have a sweet raisin nose. Sometimes Palomino vinegars are sweetened with the addition of a small amount of Pedro Ximénez wine (residual alcohol can not be more than 3%).
- Moscatel: Small amounts of sherry vinegar are produced from the Moscatel grape.

== Uses ==
Sherry vinegar is used extensively in both Spanish and French cuisine. In 2008 France was the largest market for sherry vinegar.

Vinaigrette made from sherry vinegar is particularly flavourful compared to vinaigrette made from standard wine vinegar and matches well with many foods.

In Jerez de la Frontera a traditional dish is "Riñones al Jerez": lambs kidneys with a sauce made from sherry wine and sherry vinegar.

The best sherry vinegars have a deep, complex flavour and enhance the flavours in soups, stews, sauces, casseroles and dressings.

== History ==
Vinegar from sherry has been around since sherry was first produced in and around Jerez. In the sherry bodegas wines which had undergone acetic fermentation and turned to vinegar were considered failures, however since the 1950s winemakers started to view sherry vinegar as a product in its own right and now even encourage it. They also began to carefully age their vinegars in the same way as their wines and brandies.

Barrels of Sherry developing into vinegar are always quickly removed from the bodega to prevent other casks turning into vinegar. Any barrels which have contained vinegar cannot be used to store wine again due to the risk of acetic fermentation. In the past the vinegar was given away to staff and family or sold at the bodega door. Some barrels were stored separately and often forgotten about. These vinegars, many over 50 years old, are now being re-discovered.
