= Solera =

Process for aging liquids in barrels

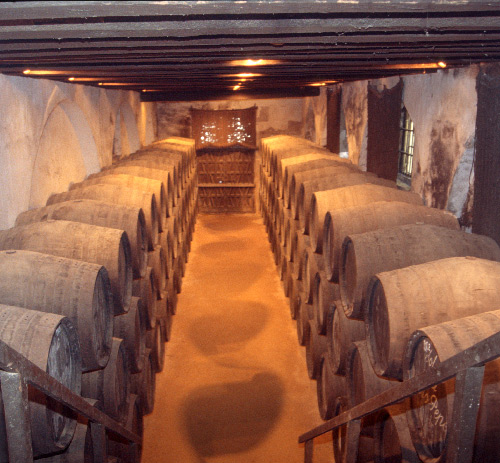
Sherry solera

Solera is a process for aging liquids, such as wine, beer, vinegar and brandy, by fractional blending, so that the finished product is a mixture of ages, with the average age gradually increasing as the process continues over many years. The purpose of this labor-intensive process is the maintenance of a reliable style and quality of the beverage over time.

Solera means "on the ground" in Spanish, and refers to the lower level of the set of barrels or other containers used in the process. The liquid is traditionally transferred from barrel to barrel, top to bottom, with the oldest mixtures being in the barrel right "on the ground". Nowadays, the containers are not necessarily stacked physically in this way but merely carefully labeled.

Products which are often solera aged include sherry, Madeira, Lillet, Marsala, Mavrodafni, Muscat and Muscadelle wines, balsamic vinegar, Commandaria, some vins doux naturels, sherry vinegars, Brandy de Jerez, beer, rums, and whiskies. Since the origin of the process is the Iberian Peninsula, most of the traditional terminology is in Spanish and Portuguese.

== Solera process ==
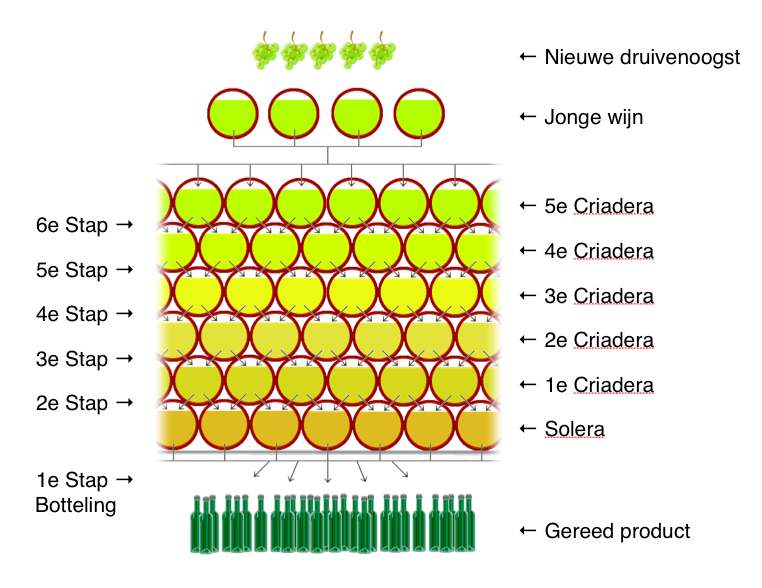
A diagram of the solera process

In the solera process, a succession of containers are filled with the product over a series of equal aging intervals (usually a year). A group of one or more containers, called scales, criaderas ('nurseries'), or clases are filled for each interval. At the end of the interval after the last scale is filled, the oldest scale in the solera (Note: the word solera is also used for the last scale.) is tapped for part of its content, which is bottled. Then that scale is refilled from the next oldest scale, and that one in succession from the second-oldest, down to the youngest scale, which is refilled with new product. This procedure is repeated at the end of each aging interval. The transferred product mixes with the older product in the next barrel.

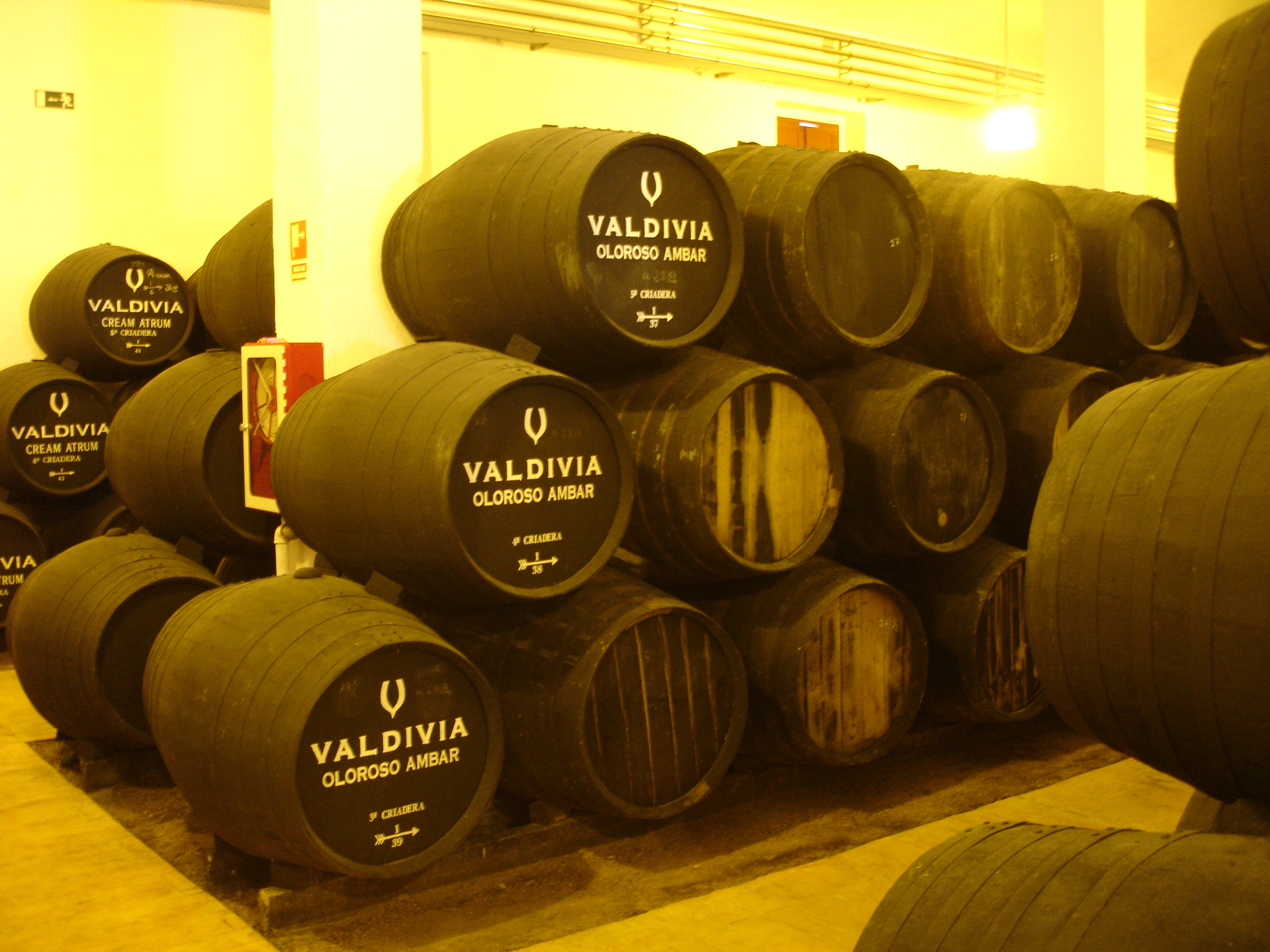
Sherry solera

No container is ever completely drained, so some of the earlier product always remains in each container. This remnant diminishes to a tiny level, but there can be significant traces of product much older than the average, depending on the transfer fraction. In theory traces of the very first product placed in the solera may be present even after 50 or more cycles. (Note: Some of the oldest soleras may be of the order of a hundred or more years old. In this case it is mathematically unlikely that even a few molecules of the earliest wines would be present, unless the transfer fraction is impractically infinitesimal.) In Andalusia, Spain, the latest regulations for labeling require careful labeling and record-keeping, usually via computer, allowing the winemaker or regulator to easily determine the average age of each container, which depends not only on the refreshment interval and number of scales, but also the relative volumes that are chosen for the refreshment process—a larger refreshment and final removal for bottling will result in a younger average age. The upper quality levels implied by the labeling system require the bottled wine to be greater in age than the regulatory requirements. (Note: for Sherries, there is a body called Consejo Regulador responsible for overseeing this system, and the age requirements are as shown here.)

== Aging ==
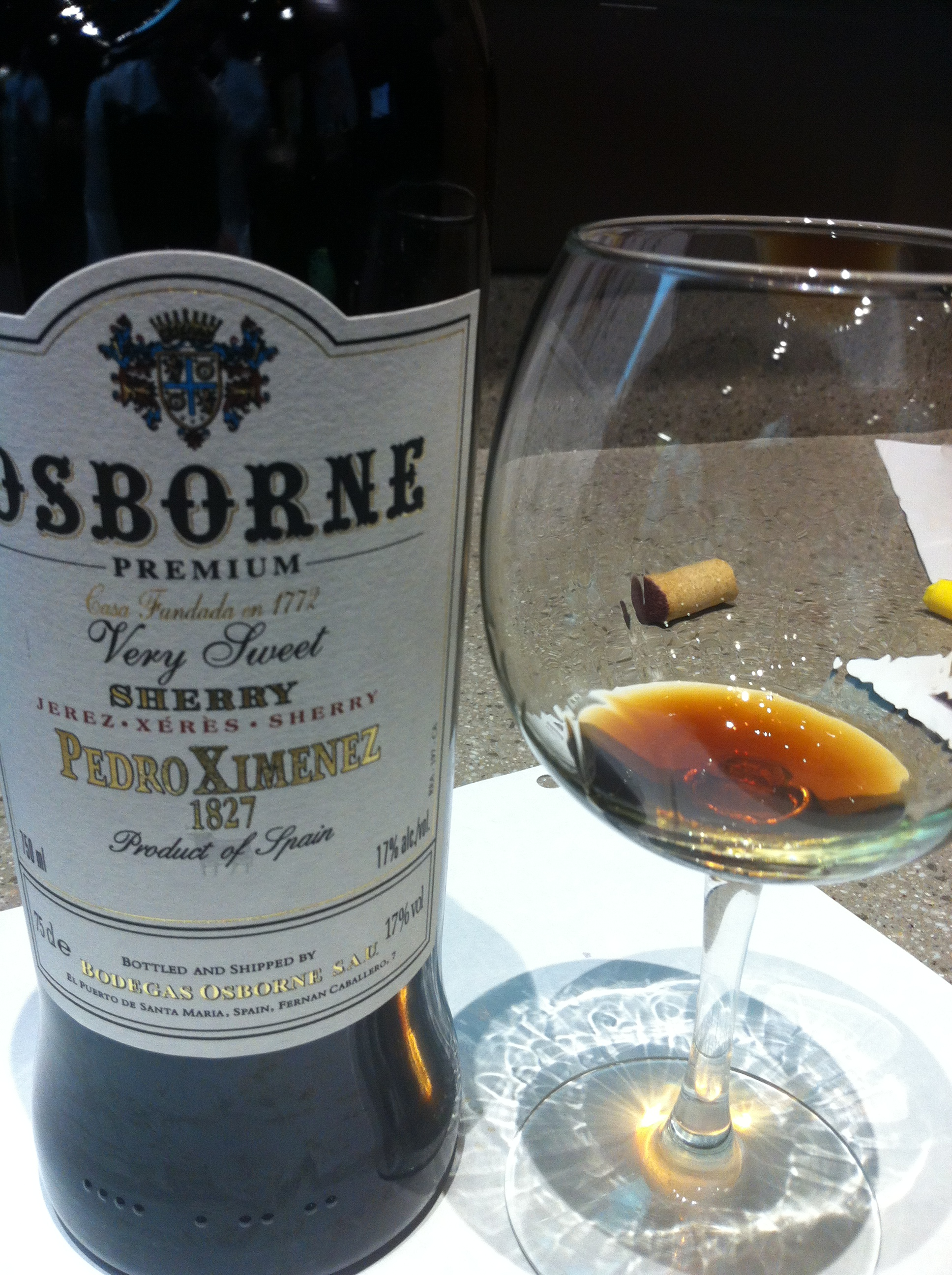
A Pedro Ximénez Sherry whose wine label indicates that the wine was aged in a solera that has purportedly been in operation since 1827

The age of product from the first bottling is the number of containers times the aging interval. As the solera matures, the average age of product asymptotically approaches one plus the number of scales (excluding the top scale) (K) divided by the fraction of a scale transferred or bottled (α), or (1 + K/α).

In the case of a solera consisting of three barrels of wine with half of each barrel being transferred once a year, for instance, the end of the third year (and each subsequent year), half the third barrel is bottled. This first bottling is aged three years. The third barrel is then refilled by transferring half of the wine from the second barrel. The wine transferred from the second barrel has an average age of 2.5 years (at the end of year 2, after barrel transfers, it was half 2-year old wine, half 1-year old wine, for an average age of 1.5 years; at the end of year 3, before barrel transfers, it will have aged another year for an average age of 2.5 years). The second bottling will then be half 3.5 years old and half four years old (the wine left in the last barrel at the previous cycle), for an average age of 3.75 years. The third bottling will be an average age of 4.25 years (one half wine that was left over from the second bottling—average age 4.75 years, and one half wine transferred from the second barrel after the second bottling—average age 3.75 years). After 20 years, the output of the solera would be a mix of wine from 3 to 20 years old, averaging very slightly under five years. The average age asymptotically converges on five years as the solera continues.

== History ==
The first written mention of the solera may be in the 1849 inventory of the house of Garvey, though the term was probably in use earlier.

== Solera in different countries ==
This process is known as solera in Spanish, and was developed by the producers of sherry. In a Spanish sherry solera, the vintner may transfer about a third of each barrel a year. A solera sherry has to be at least three years old when bottled.

A quite similar process is called sostrera, used to produce fortified wines in the Mediterranean regions of France.

In Sicily, where Marsala wine is made, the system is called in perpetuum.

Solera vinification is used in the making of Mavrodafni ('Black Laurel'), a fortified red dessert wine made in the northern Peloponnese in Greece. Exceptional Mavrodafni vintages are released every 20 or 30 years: they are of minimal availability and expensive.

Vintners in Rutherglen, Australia, produce fortified muscat-style and Tokay-style wines using the solera process. In South Australia, some fortified wines (akin to tawny port) are made from blends of Shiraz, Grenache, and Mourvèdre.

Glenfiddich, a Speyside distillery in Scotland, has a 15-year-old whisky that uses a vatting process similar to the solera. The whisky is labelled as their "15 year old single malt Scotch Whisky". For Scotch whisky, the stated age must refer to the youngest of whisky's components. Barrels are emptied into the solera vat and mixed. Then whisky is drawn from the vat to be bottled, with the vat never being more than half emptied. Since the process began in 1998, the vat has never been emptied.

The oldest port wine producer in America, Old Vine Tinta Solera at Ficklin, has used a solera since 1948.

In Okinawa, Japan, where awamori is made, the traditional system similar to the solera is called shitsugi.

The solera process has been used since the 17th century to produce sour ales in Sweden, where it is known as hundraårig öl ('hundred-year beer'). The beer is rarely commercially available, being instead made at the large manors for private consumption.

A process of partially emptying and refilling barrels with beer is undertaken by craft breweries in the United States.

=== Solera in rum production ===
Rum is sometimes aged in a method called "solera", and this is most common in Spanish-style rum. However, according to rum expert Ed Hamilton, he has not yet seen any rum be aged in a true solera method, with most instead using various types of dynamic blending. In the production of Ron Zacapa Centenario 23, though it is labeled with "solera", new barrels are used frequently, and the blending happens in batches instead of cascading from one criadera to the next. Likewise, in the production of Solera 21 rum by La Hiciera, master blender Miguel Riascos says that "ours is a very liberal interpretation of solera, our unique take".

== See also ==
- Perpetual stew
- Infinite impulse response
