= Strathspey, Scotland =

Region of Scotland

Coordinates: 57°19′N 3°36′W

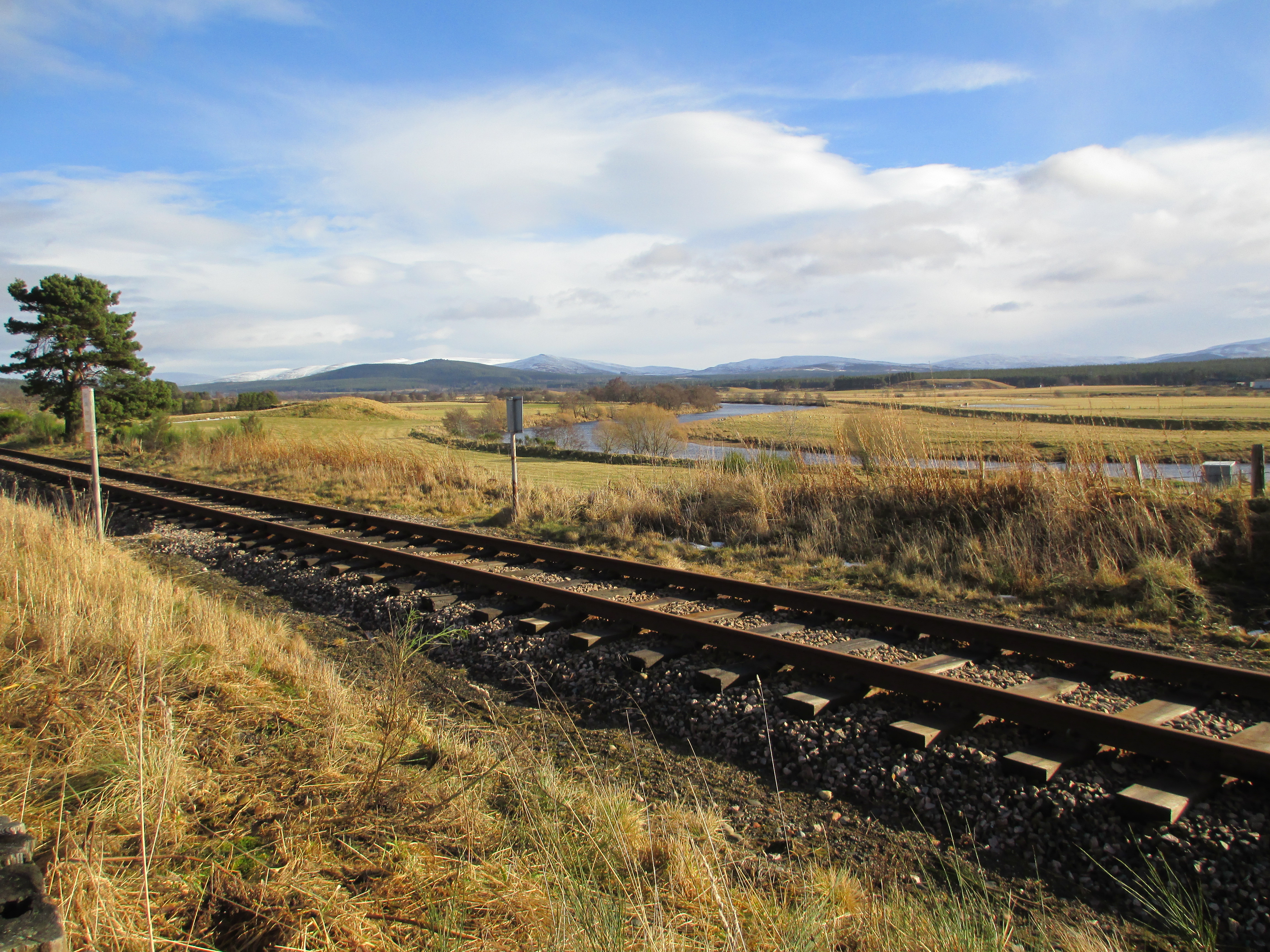
The Strathspey Railway running through Strathspey

Strathspey (Scottish Gaelic: Srath Spè, [s̪t̪ɾa ˈs̪peː]) is a region of the Scottish Highlands comprising part of the valley of the Spey. It includes the towns of Aviemore, Boat of Garten, Grantown-on-Spey, and Aberlour.

Strathspey, as traditionally defined, stretches from Upper Craigellachie (near Aviemore) to Lower Craigellachie (near the village of the same name). Above it is Badenoch and below it is the low-lying region of Speyside. The region is administratively divided between Moray and the Highland council area.

Speyside is one of the main centres of the Scotch whisky industry, with a high concentration of single malt distilleries in the region, including the Glenfiddich and Balvenie distilleries. Scotland's Malt Whisky Trail is a tourism initiative featuring seven working Speyside distilleries, a historic distillery and the Speyside Cooperage. The concept was created in the early 1980s. The region is a natural for whisky distillers because of three benefits: it is close to barley farms, contains the River Spey and is close to the port of Garmouth. The region also hosts the Spirit of Speyside Whisky Festival.

The traditional dance known as the strathspey takes its name from the valley.

== Twin towns ==
- Grantown-on-Spey, the capital of Strathspey, is twinned with Notre-Dame-de-Monts, Vendée, France
- Speyside, the area downriver from Grantown-on-Spey, is twinned with Touques, Calvados, France

== Notable residents ==
- John Robert Grant (1729–1790), a Loyalist officer during the American Revolution and refugee settler in Summerville, Nova Scotia.
- Fr. Allan MacDonald (1859–1905), a Roman Catholic priest and highly important figure in modern Scottish Gaelic literature, had family roots in Strathspey.
- Iain Ruadh Stiùbhart (1700–1752), Jacobite Army officer and war poet during the rising of 1745.

== See also ==
- Speyside single malts
- Strathspey (dance)
- Strathspey Railway
