= John Robert Grant =

American Loyalist

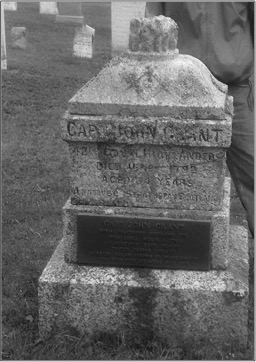
Grave of John Robert Grant, Summerville, Nova Scotia

Captain John Robert Grant (1729–1790, aged 61) fought in the American Revolution and then became an American Loyalist and the first British settler of Summerville, Nova Scotia.

== Family ==
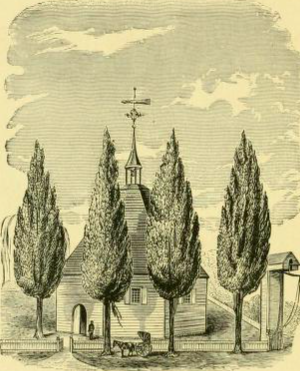
John and Sarah Grant's church: First Reformed Dutch Church of Long Island, New York

Grant was born in Strathspey, Scotland, along with John Small. Grant's wife Sarah (1743–1807) came from the well-known Bergen family of New York, who descended from Hans Hansen Bergen. They married on August 30, 1759, in New York and had 12 children. They attended The First Reform (Dutch) Church, where they were married and many of their children were baptised. Portraits were made of both John and Sarah but their location is unknown. Sarah was the daughter of Meighiel (Michael) Bergen and his first wife Femmetje (his second wife was Catelyntie). In 1767, Bergen lived on the south side of the town of Jamaica, Queens, his mill was on a pond in present-day Springfield Gardens, Queens. Because he was a loyalist, Bergen eventually requested protection from Britain. After their marriage, John and Sarah settled on Bergen's farm in Queens. Bergen left money in his will to John and Sarah's oldest son, Bergen's grandchild, Michael Bergen Grant.

== Career ==
Grant fought in the War of the Austrian Succession and served in the 42nd Regiment of Foot (Black Watch) (the same regiment as Major General John Small who settled the neighbouring Douglas Township, Hants County after the war). During the war, he served briefly under John Dalrymple, 2nd Earl of Stair at Flanders. He then fought in the Battle of Fontenoy.

During the Seven Years' War, he was in the 1758 Battle of Fort Ticonderoga, where he was wounded. He fought again in the American Revolution in the Battle of Long Island (1776), the Invasion of Martinique (1762) and the Battle of Havana (1762). He later became a captain of a Queens County, New York militia. In 1763, the Governor of New York Cadwallader Colden sent him in command of the 2nd New York regiment to Fort Herkimer to serve Sir William Johnson.

== Nova Scotia ==
He arrived in Nova Scotia on the transport HM Berwick, 1 July 1783 after evacuating his home in New York. He brought to Nova Scotia 7 of his children and 9 slaves, all of whom were buried on his property. Captain John Grant died in Summerville in 1790 at the age of 61. The Grant homestead was on what now is called Loyal Hill.

== See also ==
- Nova Scotia in the American Revolution

== Links ==
- Capt. John Grant's Company muster, 6 January 1764, New York Muster Rolls, p. 488
- Captain John Grant by Brian McConnell

== Sources ==
- The Bergen Family; Or: The Descendants of Hans Hansen Bergen, One of the ... By Teunis G. Bergen
- Mosher, Edith (1988). Land of a Loyalist. Hants, N.S.: Lancelot Press. ISBN 978-0-88999-402-7.
- West Hants Historical Society - John Grant
