= Venencia =

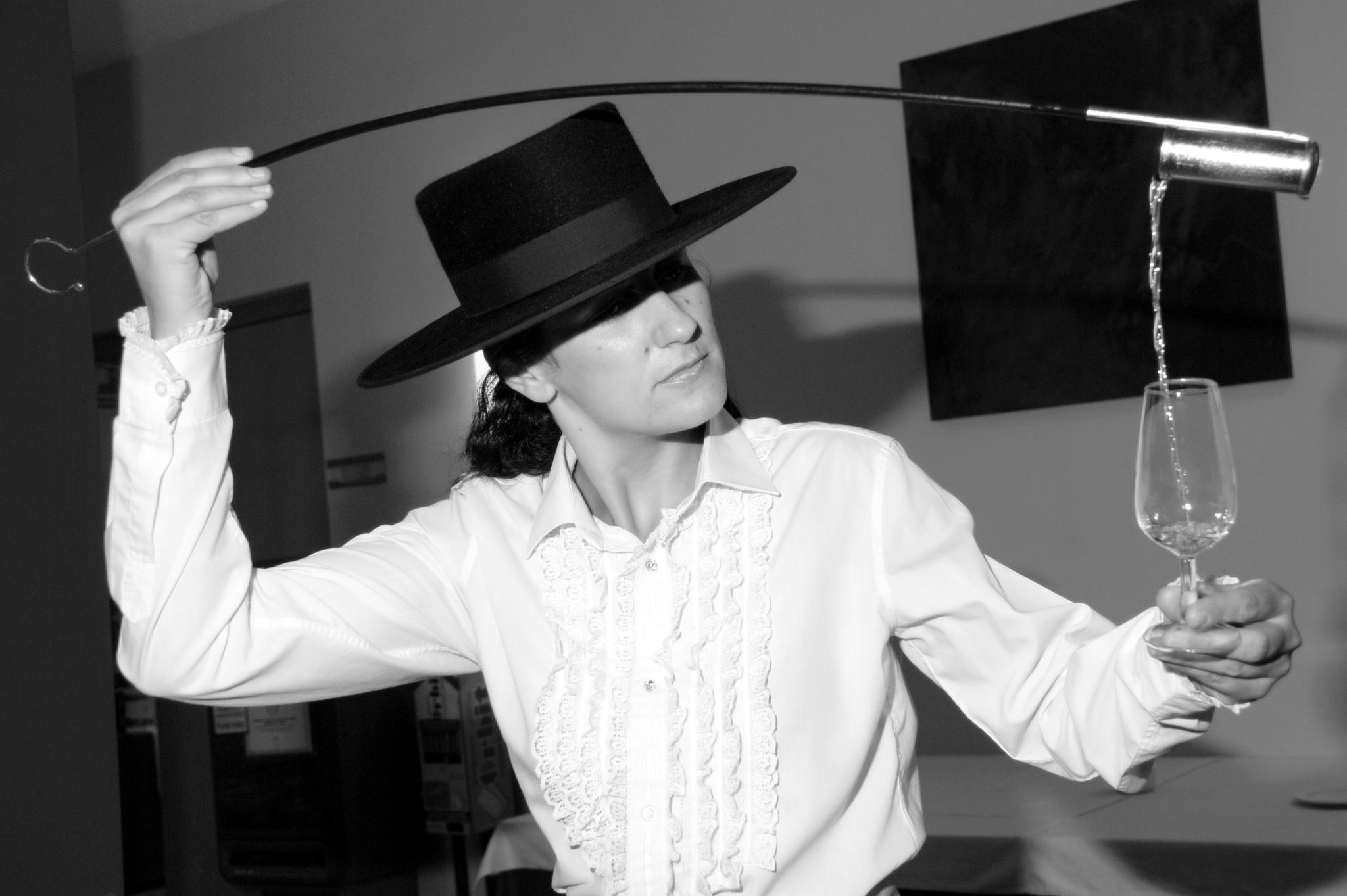
A venenciadora pours Sherry drawn from a cask (or "butt") into a catavino

The venencia is an implement used for pulling Sherry samples from the aging barrels in the cellars, consisting of a small cylindrical steel cup at the end of a long flexible shaft. It is dropped in to the barrels through the bunghole to break through the protective yeast called 'flor' that covers the aging wine. It is then poured into a glass from above head height. Those who use the venencia are called 'venenciadores'.

== History ==
Some form of venencia has been used since ancient times as noted in Greek mosaics. The modern implement is usually dated back to the 19th century or before wherein it was used to take out Sherry samples for merchants. This is how the name came to be as it is derived from the Spanish word, 'avenencia' or an agreement in that the venencia was a crucial part to forming an agreement on purchase price and quantity.

Older venencias originally had the shaft made from the whisker of a whale although this hasn't been the case for the last 60 years due to the decline in whale hunting and the fact that a shaft made of PVC has proven to be more durable. In other areas outside of Jerez, the venencia consists of a bamboo shaft cut to be a cup.
