= Summerville, Nova Scotia =

Community in Nova Scotia, Canada

Coordinates: 45°5′47.58″N 64°9′50.16″W

Summerville in Nova Scotia

Summerville is an unincorporated community in the Canadian province of Nova Scotia, located in West Hants Regional Municipality. As of 2015, the population of Summerville was estimated to be 248.

== History ==
The identities of the Acadians who settled this community prior to the Expulsion of the Acadians are unknown.

After the American Revolution, Summerville, Hants County was first settled by American Loyalists Captain John Robert Grant.

A large wharf was built at Summerville in the late 19th century to export gypsum. It was also used to repair ships and later became a vessel graveyard for old sailing ships converted to gypsum barges. Trace of the hulls of several of these large sailing vessels may still be seen at low tide, including the hull of the Barque Hamburg, the largest barque ever built in Canada.

== Climate ==
Climate data for Summerville
Month	Jan	Feb	Mar	Apr	May	Jun	Jul	Aug	Sep	Oct	Nov	Dec	Year
Record high °C (°F)	18 (64)	15 (59)	21 (70)	24 (75)	31.1 (88.0)	32 (90)	34 (93)	36 (97)	30.6 (87.1)	26 (79)	22 (72)	17 (63)	36 (97)
Mean daily maximum °C (°F)	−1 (30)	−0.6 (30.9)	3.2 (37.8)	9 (48)	15.8 (60.4)	21 (70)	24.2 (75.6)	23.7 (74.7)	19.3 (66.7)	13.3 (55.9)	7.3 (45.1)	2 (36)	11.4 (52.5)
Mean daily minimum °C (°F)	−9.4 (15.1)	−9.1 (15.6)	−5.3 (22.5)	0.1 (32.2)	5 (41)	9.6 (49.3)	13.2 (55.8)	13 (55)	9.1 (48.4)	4.5 (40.1)	0.2 (32.4)	−5.7 (21.7)	2.1 (35.8)
Record low °C (°F)	−24 (−11)	−32 (−26)	−24 (−11)	−12 (10)	−5 (23)	−1.7 (28.9)	3.3 (37.9)	1.1 (34.0)	−2.2 (28.0)	−6.7 (19.9)	−13 (9)	−22 (−8)	−32 (−26)
Average precipitation mm (inches)	99.9 (3.93)	84 (3.3)	97.3 (3.83)	80.4 (3.17)	87.9 (3.46)	69.3 (2.73)	73.7 (2.90)	72.1 (2.84)	93 (3.7)	94.4 (3.72)	99.9 (3.93)	102.1 (4.02)	1,054 (41.5)
Source: Environment Canada

== Shuffleboard Team ==
Since 2007, Summerville has been the home of the Summerville Daryns who practice and play in the area.

== Notable residents ==
- William Hall (VC) – Summerville-born winner of the Victoria Cross during the Indian rebellion of 1857. Hall was the first black person as well as the first Nova Scotian to receive the award.
