= Strathspey Railway =

Strathspey Railway may refer to two railways in Scotland:

- Strathspey Railway (preserved), a preserved railway running from Aviemore to Broomhill
- Strathspey Railway (GNoSR), between Boat of Garten and Dufftown, closed in 1966
