= Osborne bull =

Advertising icon and unofficial national emblem of Spain

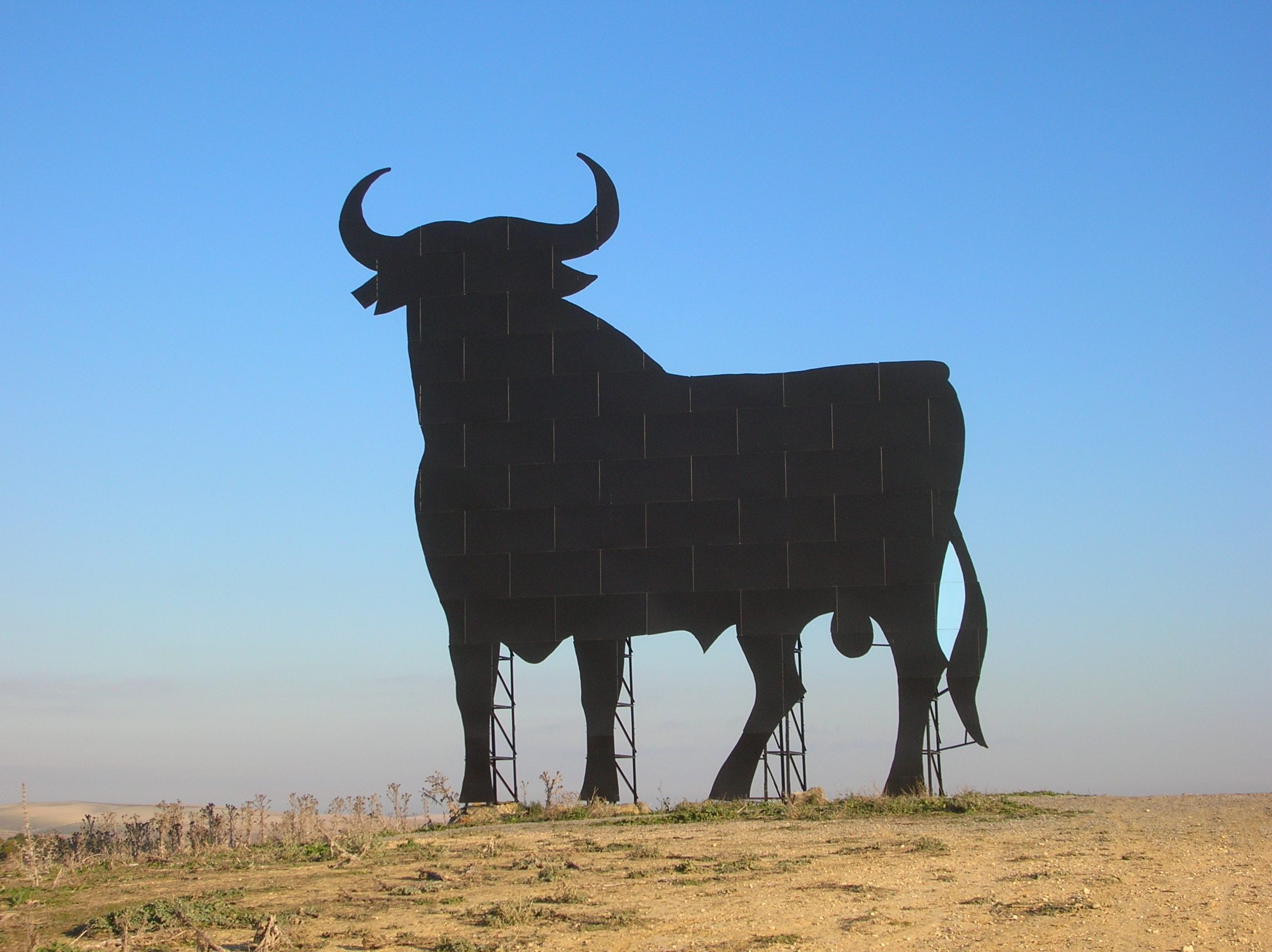
Osborne bull in Las Cabezas de San Juan, Sevilla

The Osborne bull (Spanish: El Toro de Osborne) is a black silhouetted image of a bull in semi-profile. Erected as either 14-meter-tall (46 ft) or seven-meter-tall (23 ft) billboards, as of July 2022 there are 92 of them installed on hilltops and along roadways throughout much of Spain. The bull was originally conceived as an outdoor advertisement for the Brandy de Jerez made by the Osborne Group in 1956, which also has the images on bottles and other advertising materials.

Similar bulls, also placed by the Osborne Group, but usually with the name of the Magno brandy printed on them, exist on Mexican highways.

== History ==
The bull was created by Manolo Prieto in 1956 to advertise the Brandy de Jerez produced by the Osborne Group. His design was simple: the silhouette of a bull, entirely black but for the words Veterano Osborne ('Osborne Veteran') stenciled on it.

The boards were placed near major roads in much of Spain. They were initially of wood and some four meters (13 ft) high; within a few years they were made at least partly of metal and were up to seven meters (23 ft) in height.

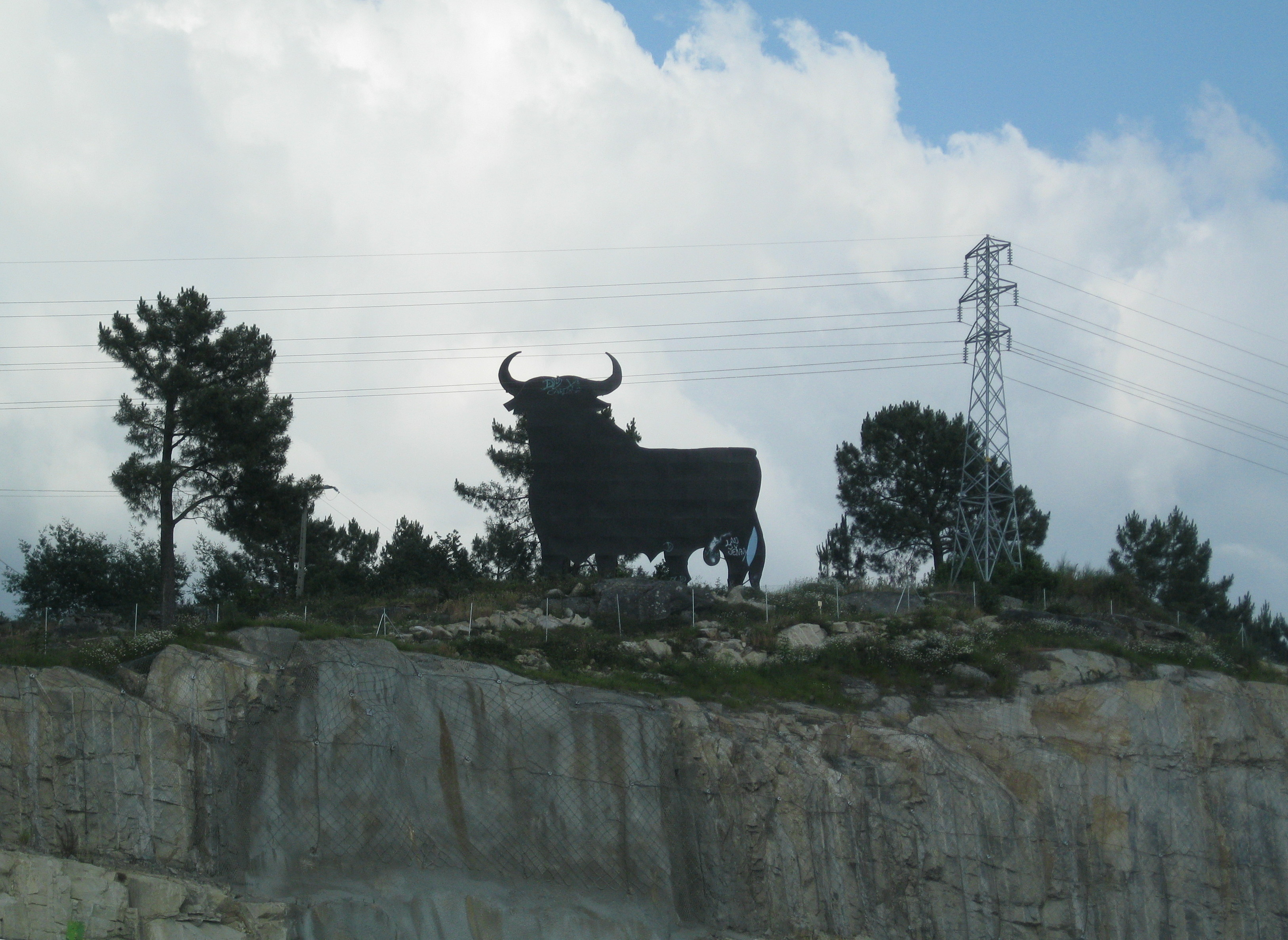
Osborne bull in Ponte Sampaio, Pontevedra

To comply with a 1962 law that prohibited advertising billboards within 20 meters (66 ft) of a road, the bulls were moved back but were increased in size to 14 meters (46 ft), weighing 4 metric tons (4.4 short tons). Then in 1974, another law required all advertising billboards to be moved to a distance of 50 meters (160 ft), so the bulls were moved again.

In July 1988 a law that prohibited all roadside advertising went into effect. All advertising content was removed from the billboards, although the bulls themselves remained.

New regulations governing national roadways in September 1994 called for the removal of all the Osborne bulls. Public outcry over the bulls' removal resulted in the Congress of Deputies declaring them a part of the "cultural and artistic heritage of the people of Spain." The bulls stayed up. In December 1997, the Supreme Court ruled that the bulls could remain, on the grounds that they had become a part of the landscape and have "aesthetic or cultural significance."

== The bull today ==
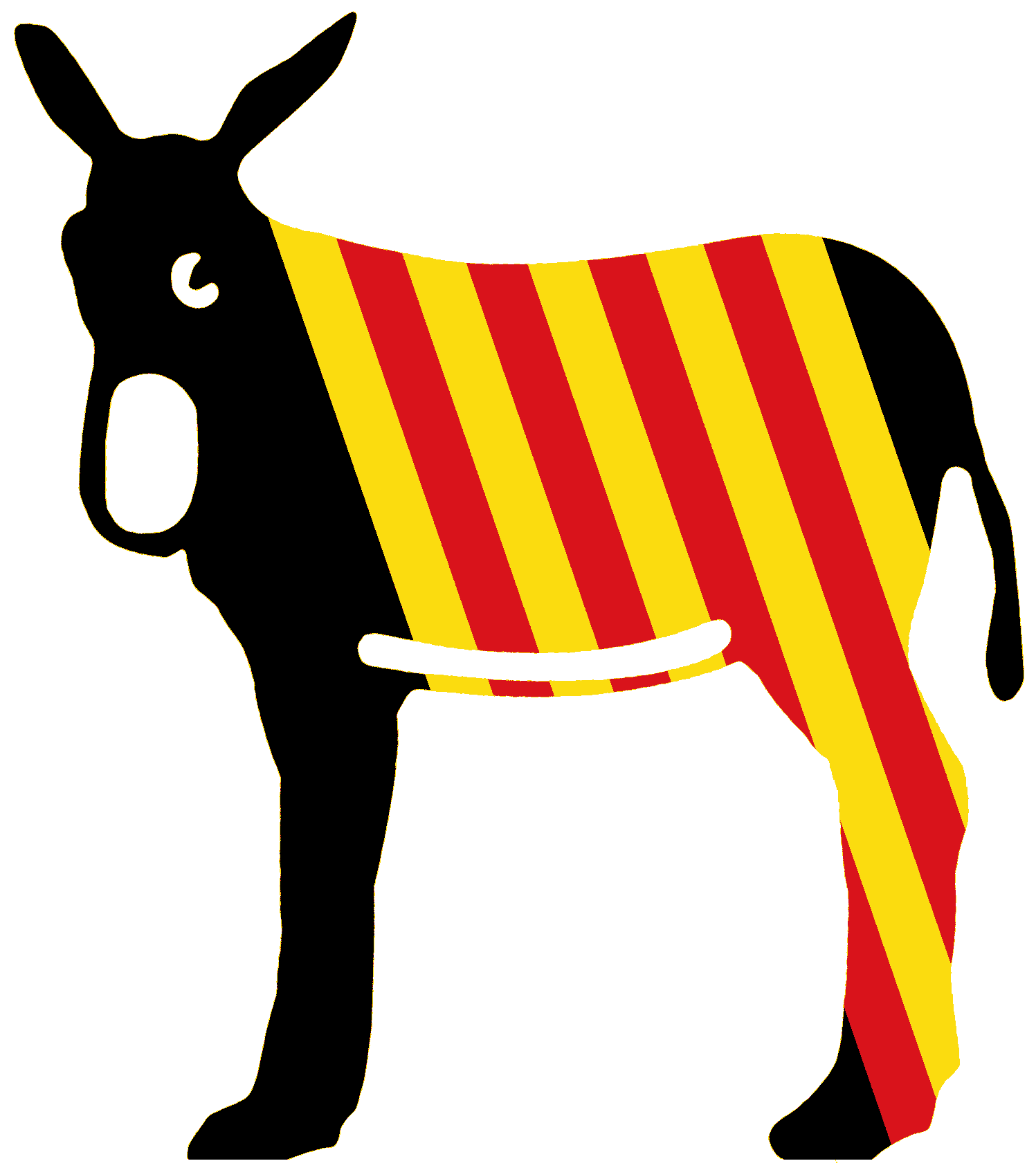
The Osborne bull is often caricatured by independence-minded regions, as shown here with the Catalan donkey

As of 1998, the Osborne bull is no longer a strictly commercial symbol. Having become a cultural icon of the country, it occasionally becomes embroiled in its politics; as a symbol associated with the national identity of Spain, it is frequently the target of vandalism by members of nationalist and independentist movements within the country.

Because the Osborne bull has become such a recognized national symbol of Spain, some of the more independence-minded Spanish regions have taken to caricaturing its image. In these regions, it is not uncommon to find similar black silhouettes of, for example, the cow used by the Galicians, the donkey used by the Catalans, the sheep used by the Basques or the Tudanca cow used by the Cantabrians.

The image of the Osborne bull is internationally recognized and can be found on stickers, souvenirs, post cards and many other items. It has become a broader symbol for Spain by sports fans, who embed it in the flag of Spain in the manner of a coat of arms, and even by members of the Spanish Armed Forces on international missions. However, as a commercial logo owned by the Osborne Group, the company retains exclusive commercial rights to its use. This has resulted in various trademark infringement lawsuits through the years.

Once numbering almost 500 across all of Spain, as of July 2022 there are 92 Osborne bull billboards erected throughout much of the country. They are scattered irregularly around the country, with a larger concentration of the bulls appearing in the south. Many regions only have one bull, while others have none.

=== Location of the Osborne bulls ===
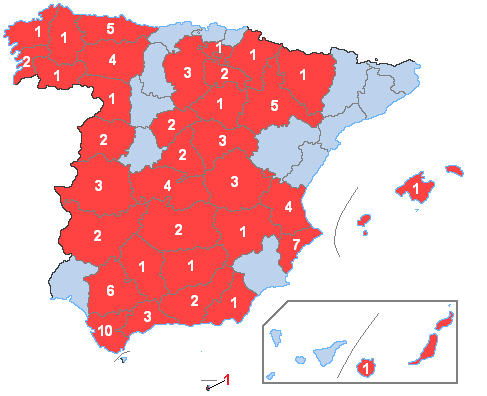
Distribution of Osborne bulls in Spain by province

Only two billboards remain in Spain with the word "Osborne" still stenciled on them. One is at the Jerez Airport northeast of Jerez de la Frontera in the province of Cádiz, and the other is in the nearby town of El Puerto de Santa María, where the Osborne Group is headquartered.

Region	Quantity	Región	Quantity
Andalucía	24	Extremadura	5
Aragón	6	Galicia	5
Asturias	5	Madrid	2
Baleares	1	Melilla	1
Canarias	0	Región de Murcia	0
Castilla-La Mancha	14	Navarra	1
Castilla y León	14	La Rioja	2
Cantabria	0	Comunidad Valenciana	11
Cataluña	0	País Vasco	1
Ceuta	0	TOTAL	92

== The bull abroad ==
As of August 2017, four of the Osborne bulls remain, in a slightly different design, in Mexico. They retain their advertising function, with “Magno” (in white) and “Osborne” (in red) stenciled across them.

An Osborne bull was erected in Spain’s North African enclave of Melilla in early 2011. Its location makes it visible along the length of the city’s Mediterranean coastline and even across the border in Morocco.

Beginning in the early 2000s, Osborne began considering requests to erect bulls in cities outside of Spain, notably in Dallas and Copenhagen. An Osborne bull originally from Spain’s Costa del Sol was installed as artwork in a public places fixture in Superkilen park in Copenhagen in the early 2010s.

An Osborne bull was erected as part of an art installation at the Echigo-Tsumari Art Triennial exhibit in Japan in July 2018, commemorating 150 years of relations between Spain and Japan. Titled The Black Symbol, the replica is 10 meters (33 ft) high and was built by workers following blueprints provided by Osborne and modified to incorporate advanced earthquake-resistance features. The installation proved so popular that, after the festival ended, the museum incorporated it into its permanent collection. The bull was integrated into a beech forest that changes with the seasons, enhancing the installation and giving added meaning to a work that was intended to be displayed outdoors.

In 2021, to mark the 65th anniversary of its creation, the Osborne bull underwent a redesign by Spanish artist Juan Díaz-Faes that combines the original black outline with a red version meant to represent the texture of the bull’s body. This redesign was displayed at the Osborne Museum in Cádiz before embarking on a worldwide museum tour with stops including London, Berlin and Beijing.

== Incidents ==
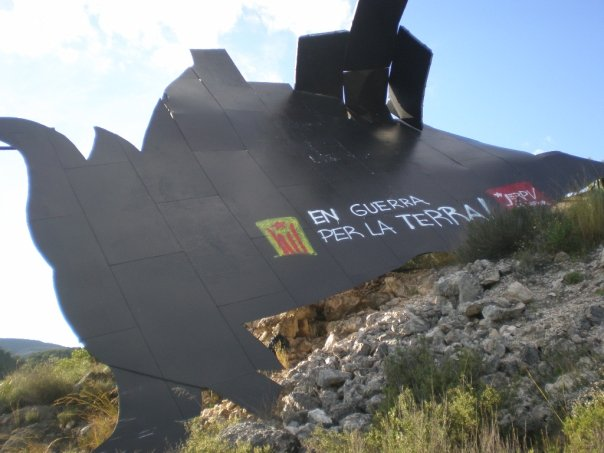
The Osborne bull in Tavernes de la Valldigna was toppled in 2009. The slogan translates from Catalan as "At war for the land!"

The only bull in Catalonia, in the municipality of El Bruc, was toppled on 12 October 2002 by people who identified themselves as Catalan independentists, protesting against what they considered a symbol of Spanish nationalism. On 3 August 2007, barely a week after the bull had been restored, Catalan independentists toppled it again. Then in March 2008, residents of the town of Masquefa restored the bull once again, only to see it ultimately demolished by the independentists less than a year later, on 24 February 2009.

A bull in the Galician municipality of Trasmiras was painted orange in January 2008, as a protest against symbols of Spanish nationalism.

In January 2009, a bull in the Valencian municipality of Tavernes de la Valldigna was destroyed in a storm with wind gusts approaching 110 kilometers per hour (68 mph). The company rebuilt it in October. In December 2016, the bull was knocked down in strong winds again, this time after vandals sawed through its lower supports. It was restored again in June 2017. Vandals again sawed through the supports, and the bull succumbed again to strong winds on 29 April 2018.

The only bull in Mallorca is often vandalized by graffiti artists or independentist or other movements. It is a frequent target of Catalan separatist groups. On 13 April 2007, the bull was painted in the colors of the LGBT rainbow flag and had its testicles removed, and remained that way for weeks before it was restored. And then, within the same month, vandals painted it with multicolor flowers. It was the target of political vandalism in December 2012, when its horns and the top of its head were cut off, and again in October 2019. The bull, covered in graffiti and in a general state of disrepair, succumbed to strong wind gusts in December 2021; it remained down for five months, until it suddenly and mysteriously reappeared in May 2022, still covered in graffiti.

Between May 8 and 11, 2005, the artist Javier Figueredo, with the help of three assistants, transformed the bull in Casar de Cáceres into a Holstein cow, referred to at the time as "the Osborne cow" (Spanish: la vaca de Osborne). They painted white spots on the bull, put a pink bow on it, and replaced its testicles with a pink steel udder they bolted onto the frame. Figueredo said at the time that he did it to spark more cultural interest in the region. The local authorities charged him with vandalism.

On 18 May 2017, as a protest against bullfighting, the urban artist Sam3 reproduced Picasso's Guernica on the bull in the Alicante town of Santa Pola.

Over the course of one night in late May 2022, an unknown artist and three assistants painted a seven-meter (23 ft) bull in A Limia sky blue, which caused it to seemingly disappear into the sky at certain times of the day. (This same bull had also been painted white in 2008, which also caused it to seemingly disappear under certain lighting conditions.) Calling it an act of vandalism against private property and not a form of artistic expression, by late July Osborne had repainted the bull black.

== In popular culture ==
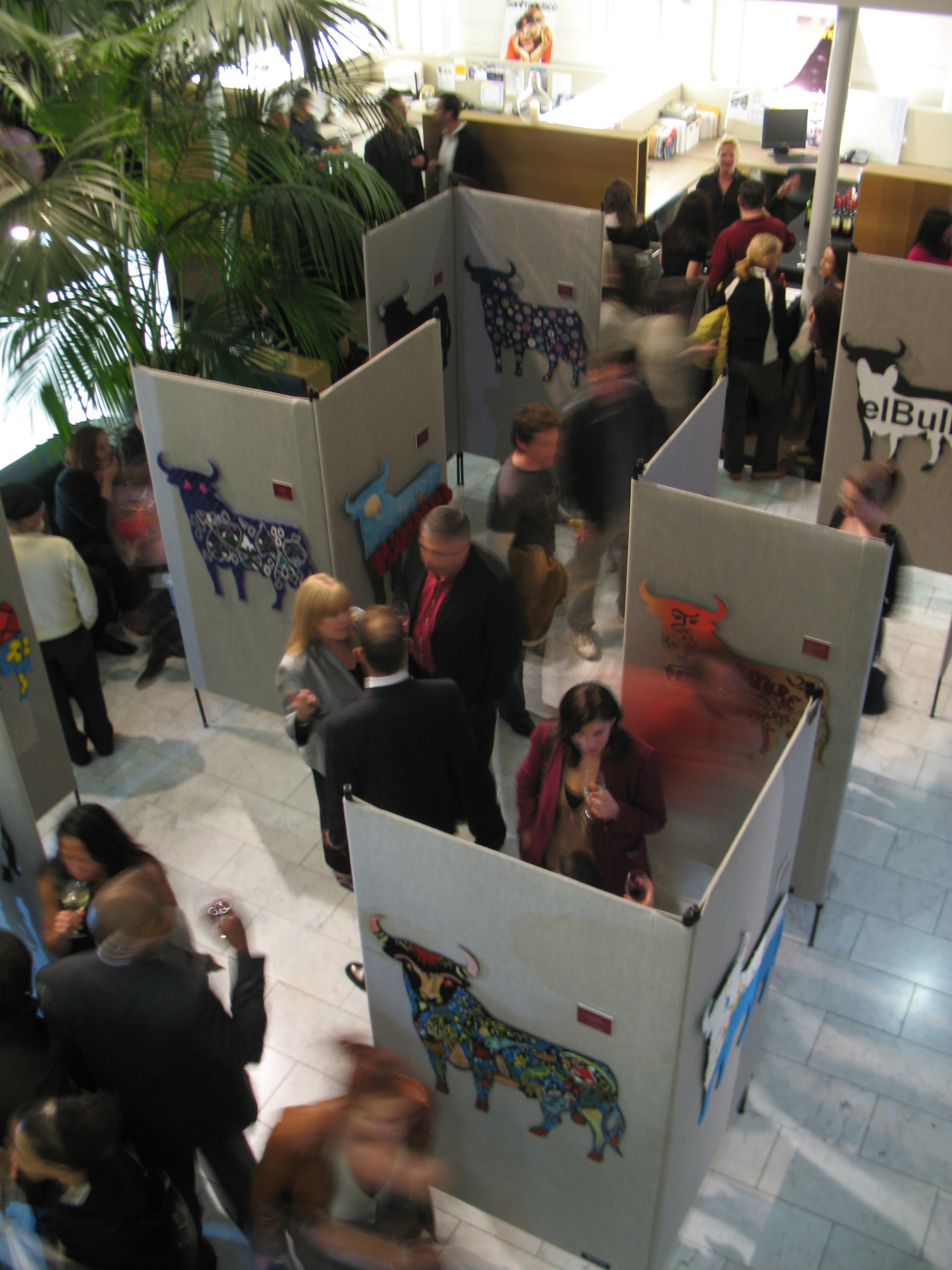
One of the US "Art Bulls for Charity" exhibits, on January 18, 2007

- An Osborne bull (and his testicles in particular) figures prominently in director Bigas Luna's 1992 film Jamón Jamón.
- The Osborne bull was included in the exhibit "Signs of the Century: 100 Years of Graphic Design in Spain" held from March 14 to May 23, 2000 at the Queen Sofía National Museum Art Centre in Madrid.
- John Robinson's character in Gus Van Sant's 2003 film Elephant wears a yellow tee shirt with an image of the Osborne bull.
- To celebrate the bull’s 50th anniversary, in 2006 to 2007 Osborne partnered with the Washington, DC–based nonprofit Share Our Strength to launch the "Art Bulls for Charity: Osborne’s Charge Against Hunger" fundraiser in the United States. Some two dozen notable personalities were given a small PVC version of the bull, along with painting materials, which they then decorated. Starting with an exhibition on November 3, 2006, in Dallas, the bulls then traveled to Chicago, Washington, DC, San Francisco and Los Angeles before being auctioned off at the South Beach Wine and Food Festival in Miami Beach on February 23–25, 2007, with all money raised going to battle hunger.
