= Brandy de Jerez =

Spanish brandy brand line

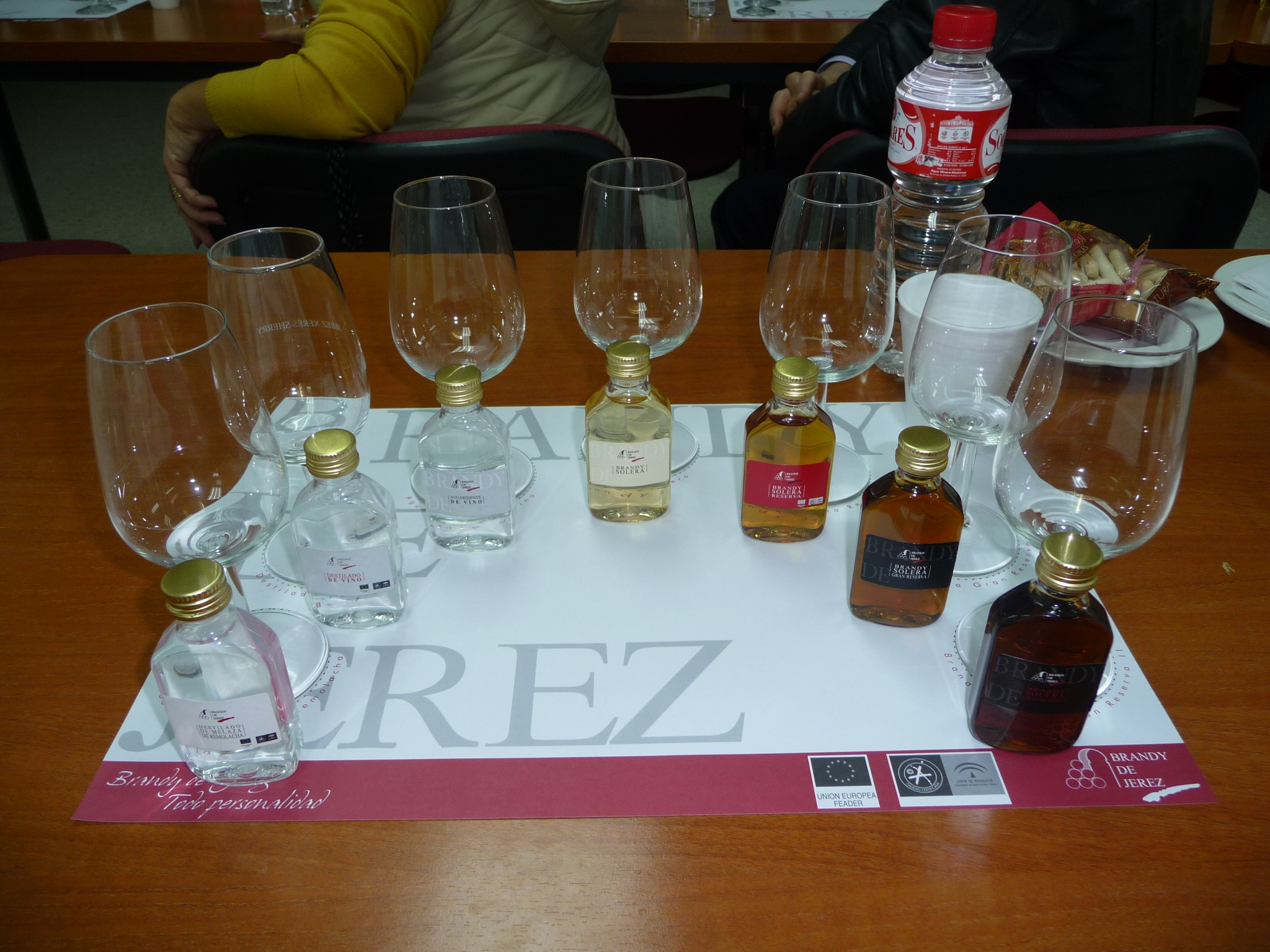
Brandy de Jerez tasting session

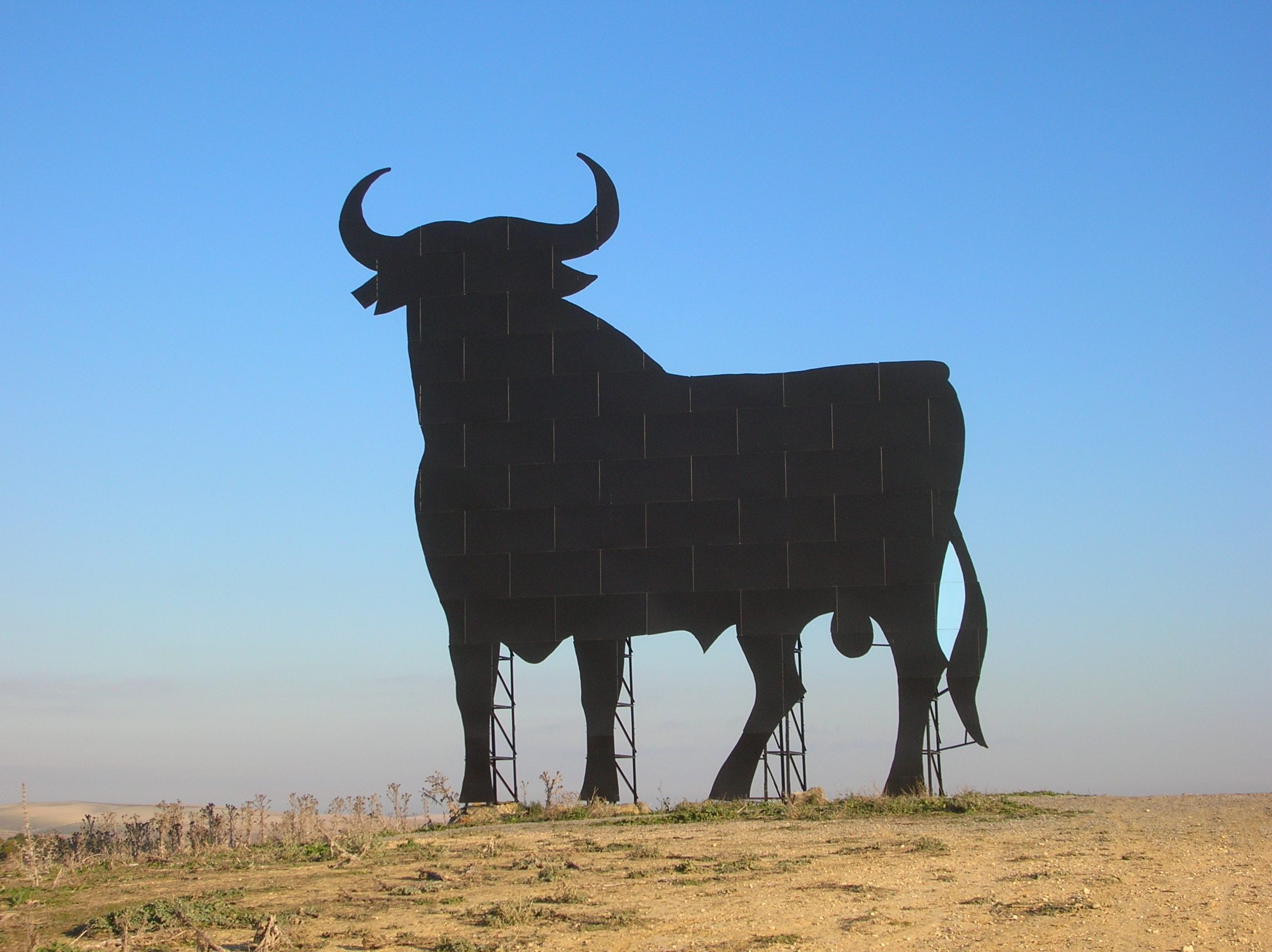
The Toro de Osborne (Osborne bull), was created to advertise Brandy Veterano.

Brandy de Jerez is a brandy that is matured in a solera system in the Jerez area of Andalusia, Spain. Besides being sold as a brandy, it is also an ingredient of some sherries. It has a Protected Designation of Origin (PDO), being matured exclusively within the "Sherry Triangle", the municipal boundaries of Jerez de la Frontera, El Puerto de Santa María and Sanlúcar de Barrameda, in the province of Cádiz.

== History ==
Being unable to drink the already famous wines to be found in the Jerez region for religious reasons, the Moors opted to distil them in order to obtain “alcohol” not only to make perfumes but also for antiseptic and medicinal use. When wine spirits began to be aged in oak-wood casks in order to produce brandy is unknown. However, by the sixteenth century sufficient wine spirit was being produced that levies on its manufacture could be dedicated to public works, as in the Town Council of Jerez handing over the revenue from its municipal Wine Spirit Tax to the Church in 1580 for the construction of a Jesuit college.

The eighteenth and nineteenth centuries saw the consolidation in Spain of the production of wine spirit for commercial use destined for exportation, especially to countries in Northern Europe. The Netherlands was the main market and from there shipped on to practically the whole world.

Brandy is an English adaptation of the original Dutch word “brandewijn” (burnt wine) whilst the term holanda (name given to wine spirits of low alcoholic content used in the production of Brandy de Jerez) is derived from the name of the country to which most of the exports were destined: Holland. The term 'brandavin' was already in use in picaresque literature of the 17th Century, as can be seen in “The Life and Works of Estebanillo González, man of good humour”. In the early 19th century English and French merchants began to arrive in Jerez and, together with Spanish traders with clear commercial instincts, promoted trade and laid down the guidelines for the characteristic production and ageing process of Brandy de Jerez.

The creation of brand names for Brandy de Jerez occurred during the 19th Century on the initiative of sherry firms who were pioneers in the sale of brands which still exist today, not only in Spain but in numerous countries throughout the world.

== Production ==
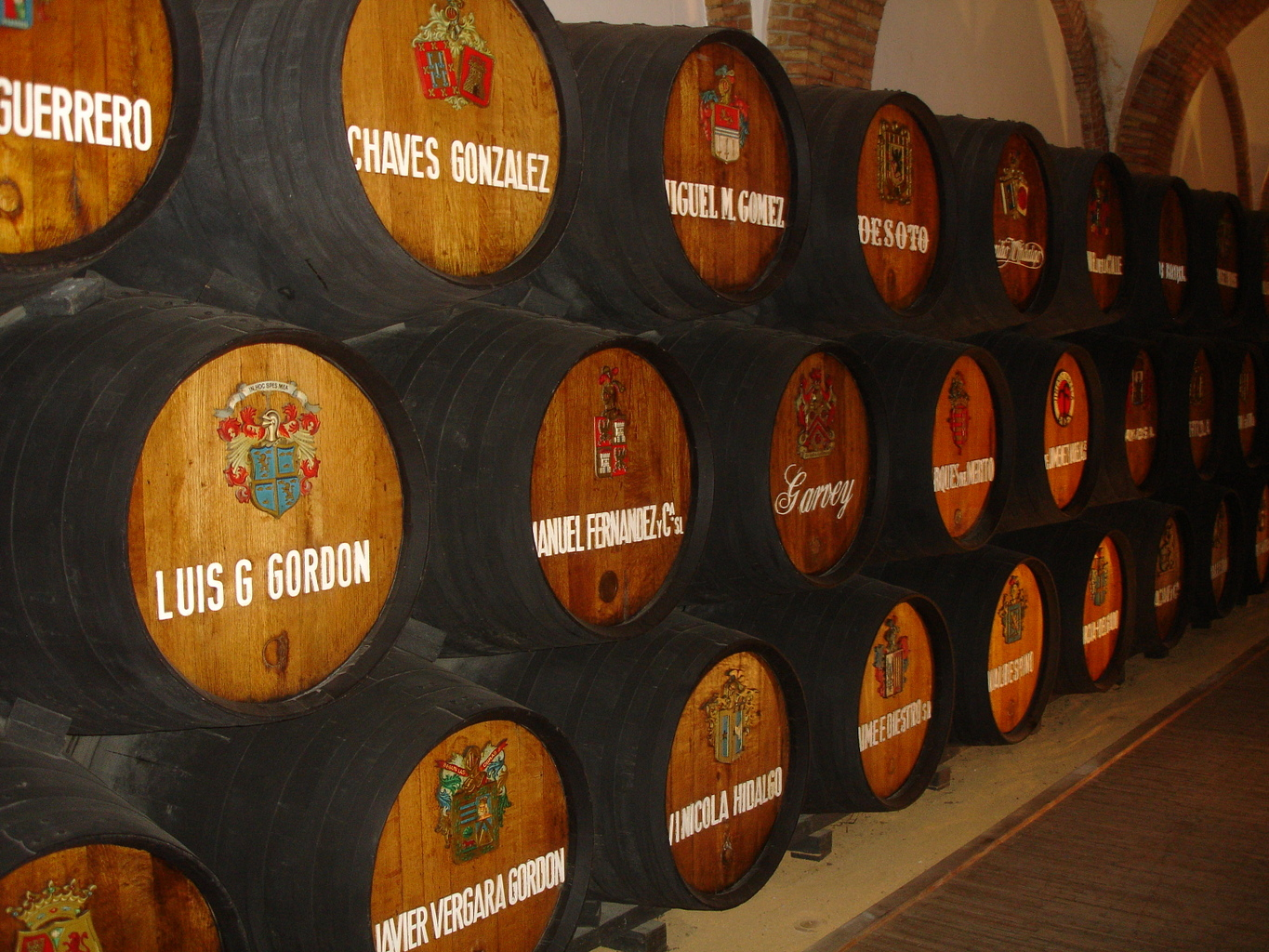
Casks of brandy de Jerez

Brandy de Jerez uses two different types of distillation equipment, both made of copper:

1. the traditional pot still which in Jerez is called an alquitara – introduced by the Moors - made of copper and heated directly by a holm-oak wood fire using a discontinuous process (loading and unloading). These are used to obtain spirits of low alcoholic content, between 40° and 70°. Holandas is the term used in Jerez to refer to these wine spirits low in alcoholic content, which are of greater quality as they require the distillation of the best of wines and better evoke the raw material from which they are produced.
2. distillation columns which are more modern and efficient into which the wine is introduced continuously. These columns are used in order to obtain strengths of between 70° and 94.8°.

In the case of Brandy de Jerez double distillation is not required. From a simple distillation wine spirits of 65% by volume are obtained. The more a wine is distilled, the more of its characteristics and aromatic substances are lost.

The traditional production method of Brandy de Jerez is controlled by the Consejo Regulador del Brandy de Jerez (the Brandy de Jerez Regulatory Council). The method has three main characteristics:

1. The brandy must have been produced exclusively within the municipal boundaries of Jerez de la Frontera, El Puerto de Santa María and Sanlúcar de Barrameda.
2. It must be aged in American oak casks with a capacity of 500 liters that previously contained sherry. Different types of sherry give the brandy a slightly different flavor.
3. The traditional aging system of criaderas y soleras must be used.

In Jerez it is also possible to use wine spirits of a higher degree of alcoholic content, but never (by decree of the Consejo) more than 50% of the total. The holandas must always represent 50% minimum of the final brandy.

== Classification of Brandy de Jerez ==
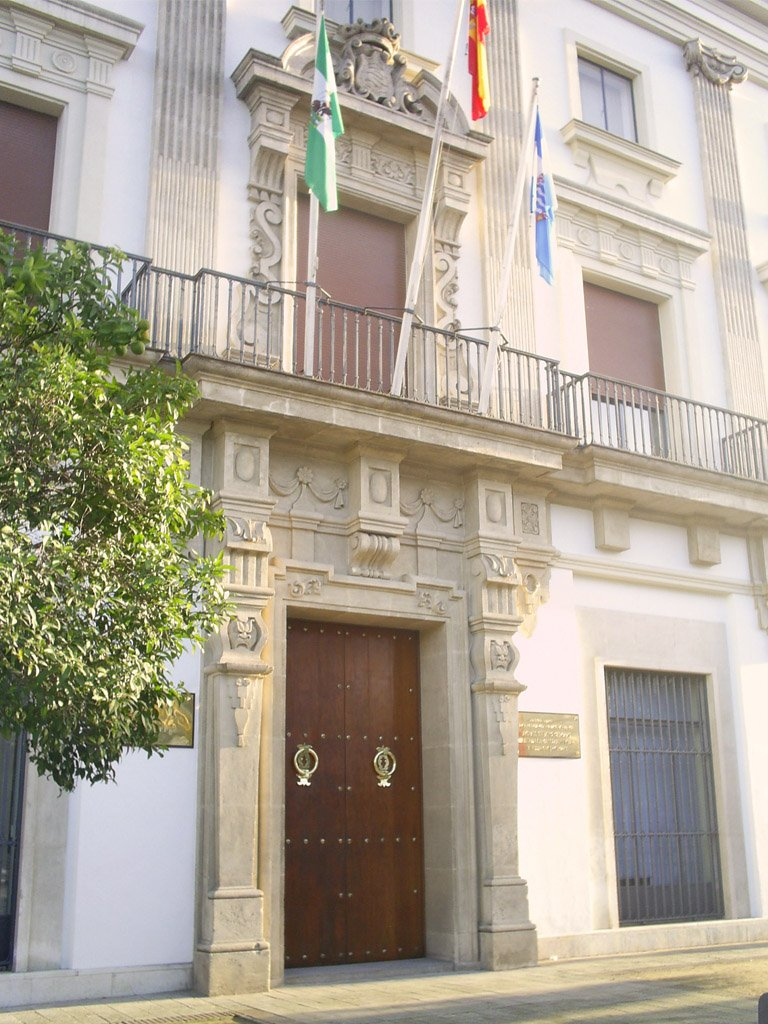
Offices of the Brandy de Jerez Regulatory Council in Jerez

The Brandy de Jerez Regulatory Council classifies brandy de Jerez according to age:

- Brandy de Jerez Solera — Is the youngest, with a minimum average age of 6 months and a volatile content greater than 150 mg. per 100 cc. pure alcohol
- Brandy de Jerez Solera Reserva — With a minimum average maturation period of 1 year and a total content of volatile components of 200 mg. per 100 cc. of pure alcohol.
- Brandy de Jerez Solera Gran Reserva — Is the longer aging, with a minimum average of 3 years and a total content of volatile components of 250 mg. per 100 cc. of pure alcohol.

== Tourism ==
"Enotourism" is a quite new kind of tourism that looks for places where wines and distilled beverages are produced. Recently the Route of Sherry Wine and Brandy de Jerez has been established.

== Brandy de Jerez in Spanish cuisine ==
Brandy de Jerez is being used in Spanish cuisine in recent years, especially with meats.
