= History of Algeciras =

History of a region of Spain

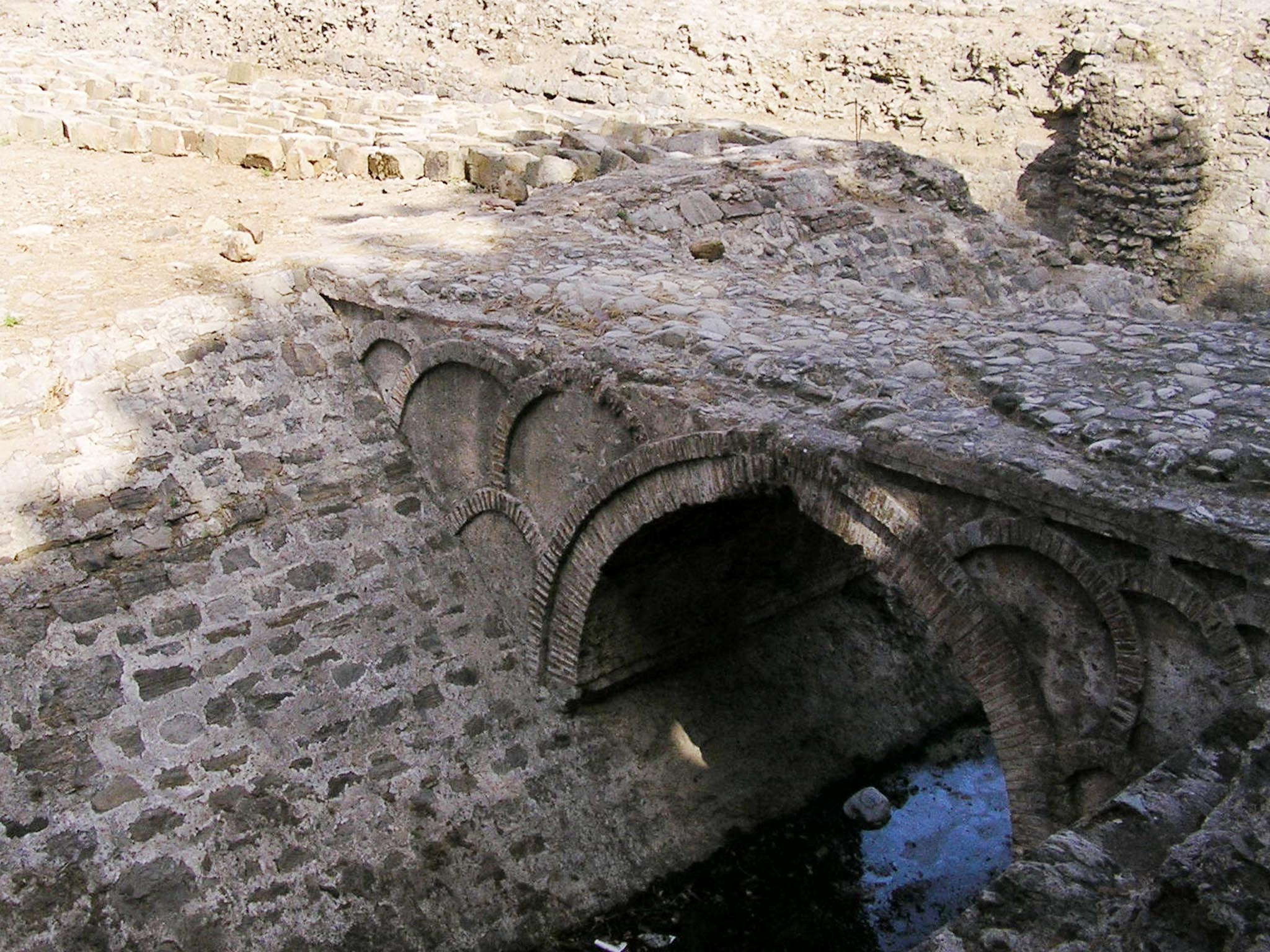
Villa Nueva access bridge.

The history of Algeciras, a Spanish region, can be traced back to initial Paleolithic outdoor settlements. In antiquity, Algeciras was home to two significant settlements: the Roman city of Iulia Traducta, which served as an important commercial hub, and the city of Al-Yazira al-Jadra, the first Arab settlement established in the peninsula. Following a three-century period of abandonment, a new city of Algeciras was re-founded in 1704.

The most noteworthy aspect of its history is the uninterrupted process of development and destruction of the various settlements that have constituted it. Consequently, the city would have undergone at least three periods of abandonment and destruction: during the transition from Carthaginian to Roman occupation, from Byzantine to Muslim rule, and from the latter to Spanish occupation in the modern era.

During the Middle Ages, an era of considerable prosperity and architectural grandeur for the city, it would have also endured at least four significant sieges.

The history of Algeciras attests to its strategic and cultural significance over centuries, making it one of the most influential cities in Spanish history. In the present era, Algeciras has become the primary seaport of Spain and is among the most populous and fastest-growing cities in Andalusia, having been repopulated within the past three centuries.

== Prehistory ==
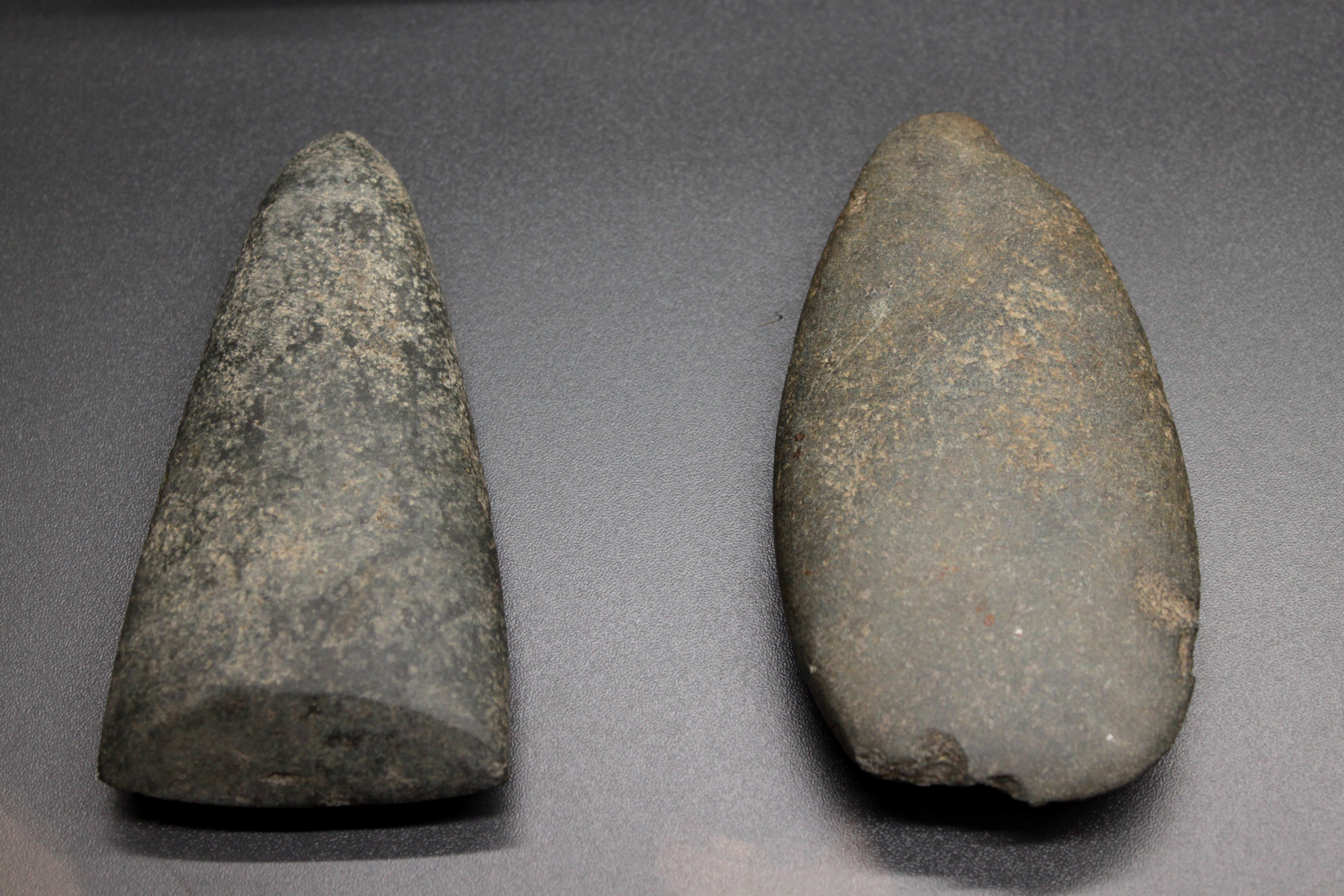
Bronze/Chalcolithic Age polished axes from the site of the Río de la Miel gorge.

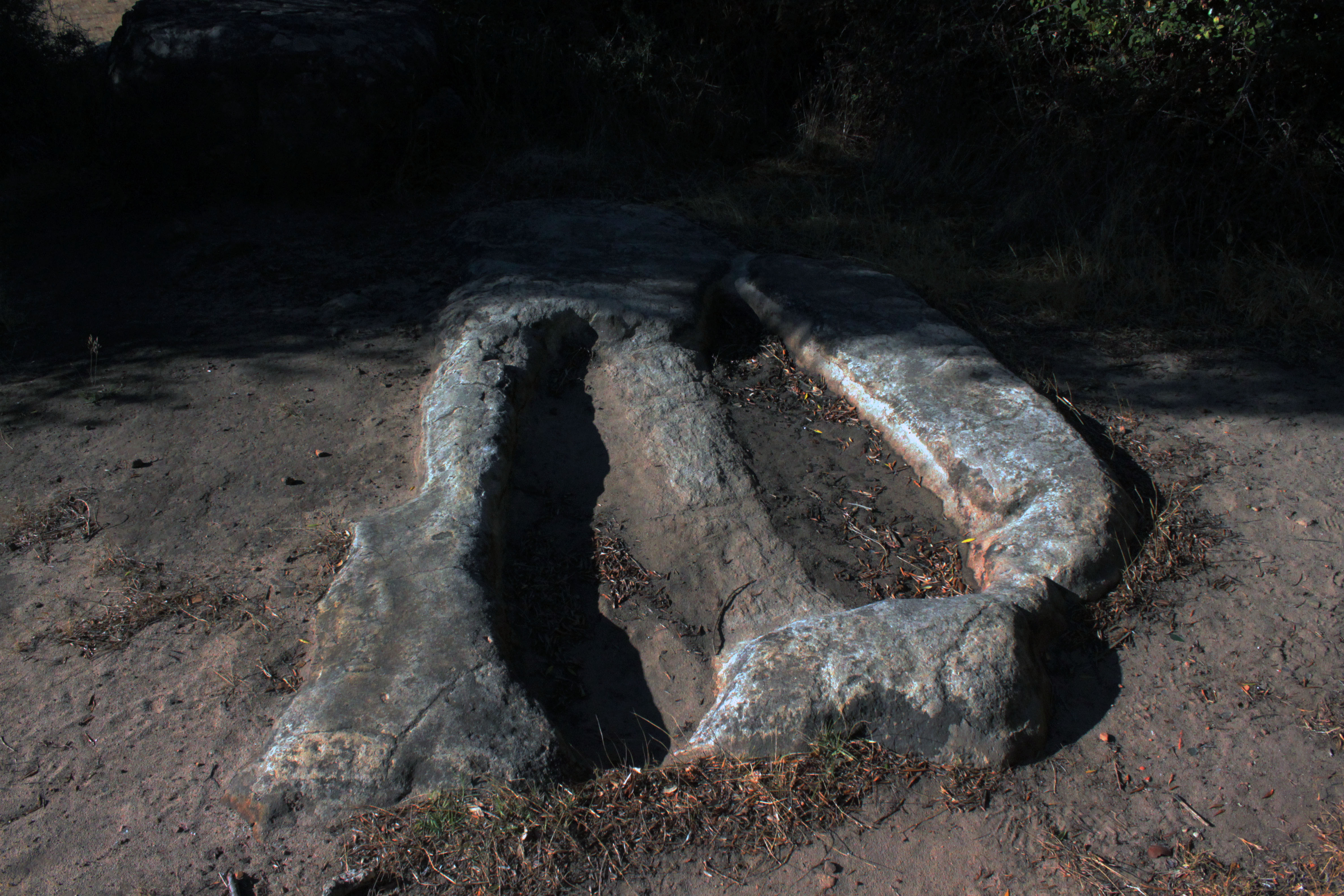
Tombs excavated in the rock in the area called Llano de las tumbas (Tombs' plain)

A considerable number of lithic tools have been unearthed, some of which were discovered in the city's Villa Nueva. The site of the Palmones river wharf, which was excavated in 1994, yielded numerous flint and protoquartzite tools dated to the Acheulean period, as well as the site located in the vicinity of Playa de Getares, which also yielded significant findings.

The presence of Neanderthal man on the northern shore of the Strait of Gibraltar is confirmed in the paleontological record by the discovery of several remains in several caves of the Rock of Gibraltar. In the municipality of Algeciras, a single isolated lithic industry associated with Homo neandertalensis has been found around the El Saladillo stream, which would place groups of hunter-gatherers belonging to this human species in the region.

The majority of the prehistoric sites in the area date back to the Paleolithic and Neolithic periods. The archaeological record also includes several hand axes from the Solutrean period in the Torrealmirante area and in Punta Carnero, indicative of hunter-gatherer societies.

In the area around the city there are shelters with rock art dating from the Palaeolithic to the Late Roman period, called Arte Sureño, or "southern art."

== Ancient history ==
=== Punic period ===
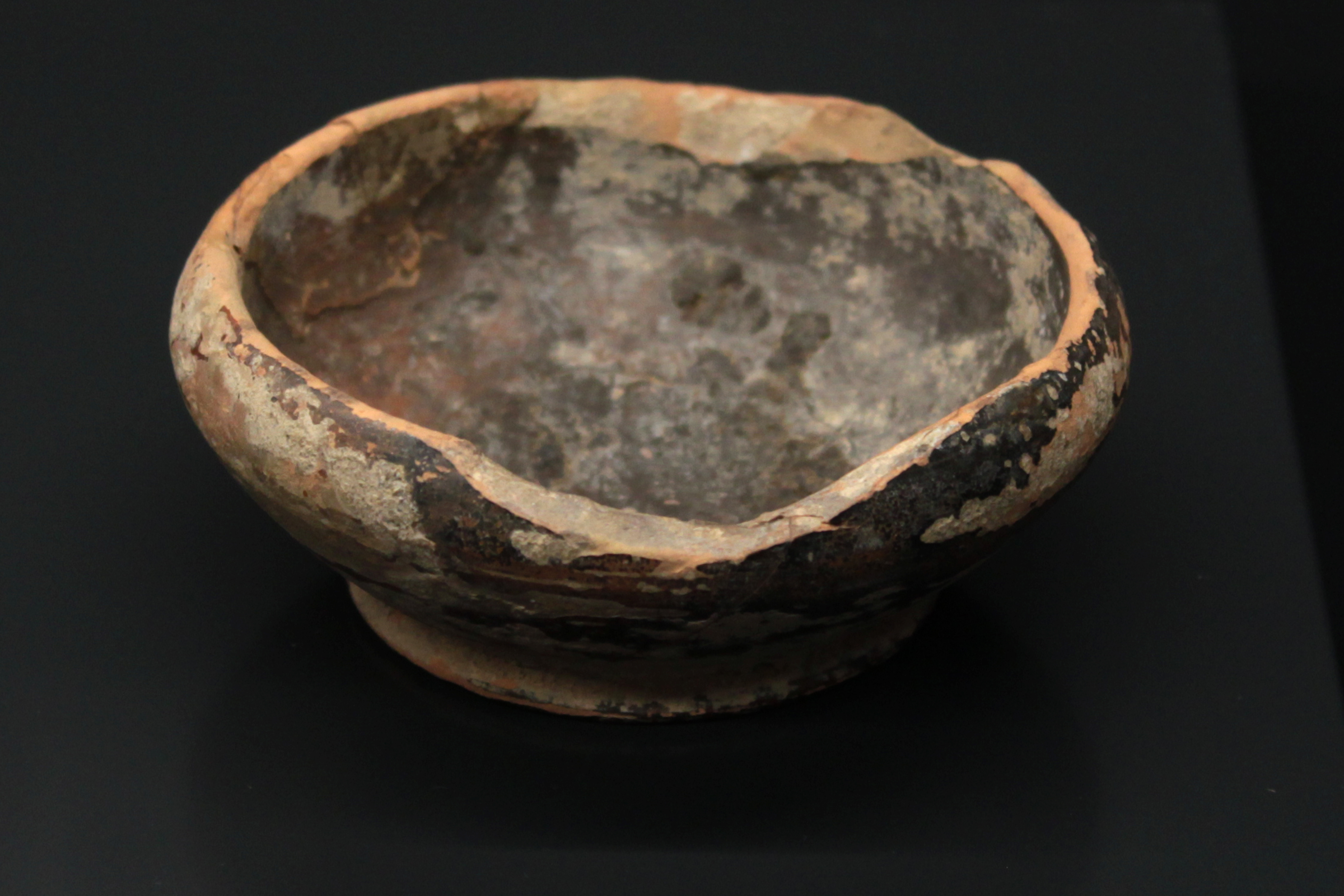
Attic bowl corresponding to between the 4th and 3rd centuries B.C. located in a deposit of the Baluarte Street of Algeciras.

The neighboring city of Carteia played a significant role in the Carthaginian world since its foundation in the 4th century B.C. It was especially renowned for its economic strength as a stopover on the sea route that linked the cities of Malaka and Gades. As a result, any reference to another town in the Bay of Algeciras is largely absent from the historical sources. Modern archaeology employs the consistency of Phoenician-Punic settlement patterns to identify new sites. It is therefore evident that they deliberately selected locations for the construction of ports and even cities. In this way, they almost invariably sought a promontory in close proximity to the coast, easily defended by land and sea, and with access to running water. The excavation of sites in locations that meet these criteria has revealed numerous findings that were previously overlooked in written sources. The Punic site of Cala Arenas and other smaller sites still under study in the municipality of Algeciras were located in this context. This coastal landmark, situated to the west, is believed to have served as a point of sustenance and a temporary halt before or after traversing the Strait of Gibraltar.

The evidence suggests that a small city or port existed in the urban center of Algeciras since at least the 5th century B.C. This is evidenced by the discovery of Attic pottery in the Villa Nueva area of the city. It is thought that this was the origin of the later Roman city of Iulia Traducta. The possibility of the existence of a settlement, perhaps a temple to Melqart in Isla Verde, a few meters from Río de la Miel, is also considered by some experts.

=== Roman period ===
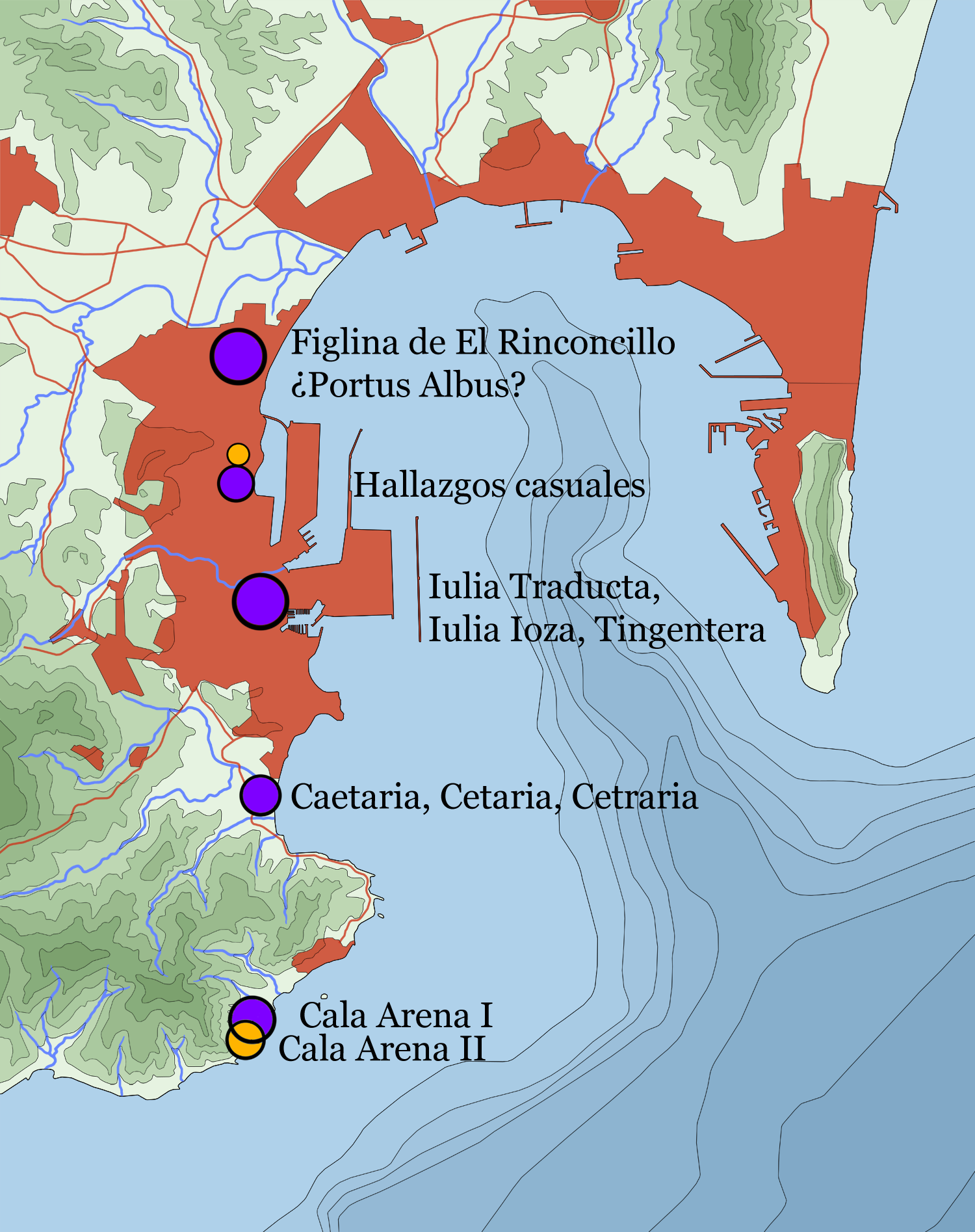
Punic sites (orange), and Roman sites (purple),) in the municipality of Algeciras.

A total of three Roman settlements have been identified in the city through the combination of classical sources and the archaeological record. The interpretation of the sites with the names provided by geographers of the time is a topic of debate among experts. Three toponyms are known from this period: Iulia Traducta, Caetaria and Portus Albus. These are located with varying degrees of certainty in three different areas of the city;

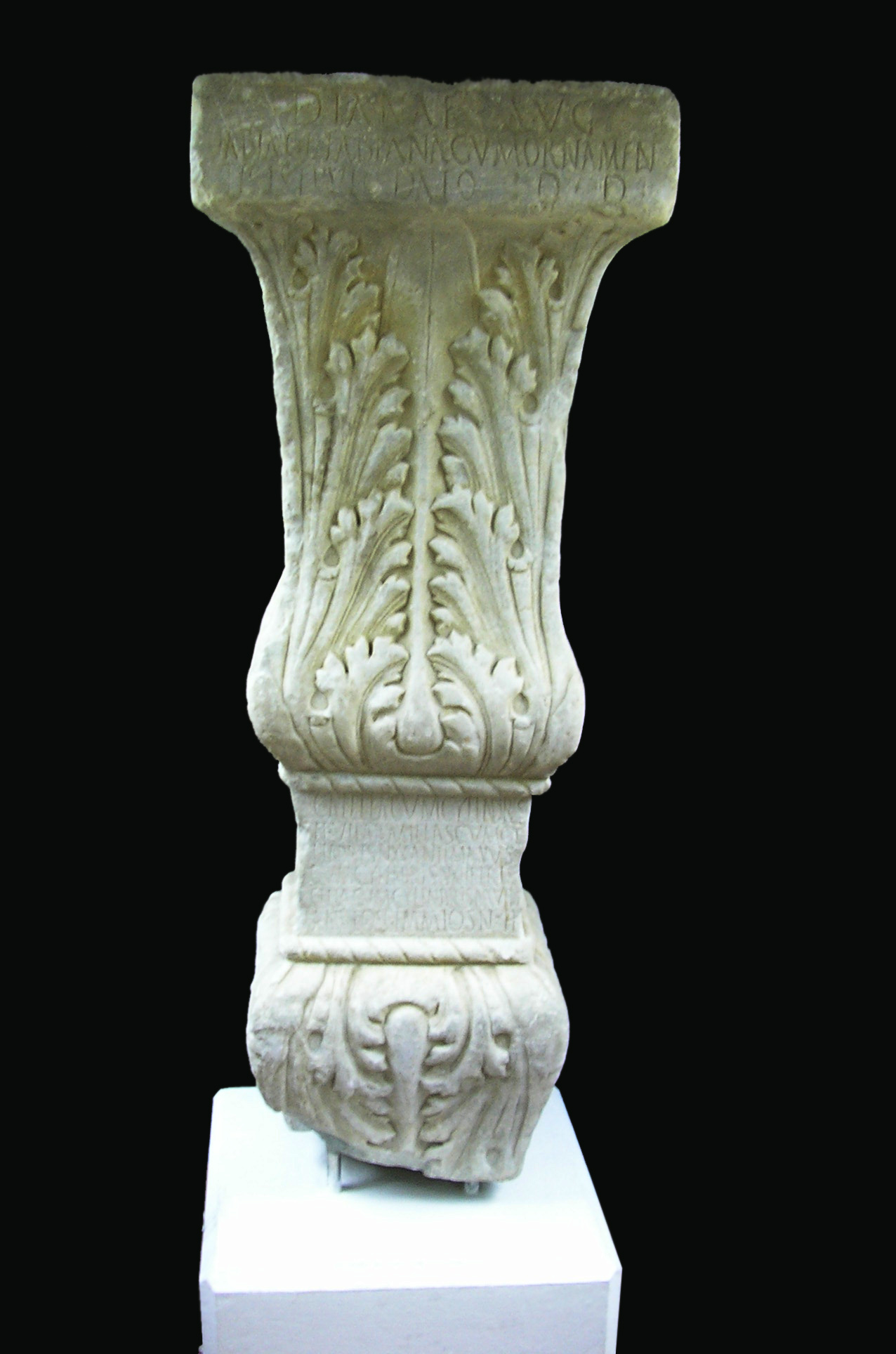
1st century pedestal dedicated to the Greek goddess Diana in Algeciras.

==== Iulia Traducta ====
Located beneath what is currently the Hotel Reina Cristina in the Villa Vieja. A number of historians have previously proposed that the city in question could not be Algeciras, largely due to the absence of Roman remains. However, recent findings have challenged this assertion. In the mid-20th century, for instance, the discovery of Roman structures, sewage system remains, and column bases beneath the aforementioned hotel led to the interpretation of this area as the city's acropolis. Next to it, the industrial complex for the elaboration of garum of the Roman fish salting factory in the current street of San Nicolás, dating from the 1st century, and formed by several small independent factories of greater or lesser size within a building or enclosure that would close an industrial neighborhood. The port is usually located in the estuary of the Río de la Miel, where it was also located in the Middle Ages until its silting. There is often talk of a neighborhood associated with the port in the lower part of the Villa Nueva in alluvial areas as an explanation for the specific deposits of the 1st century located there. According to the chronicles the city was populated in Roman times with people from Tinjis (Tangier) and Zilis, as a measure of punishment to this North African city for the insurrections against the empire that had starred, hence the name of Iulia Traducta. It was also called Iulia Ioza, Ioza is a Punic word that would mean "transported", like traducta obvious duality if you think that the North African citizens who lived in the city would maintain their own language. It is also called by Pomponius Mela Tingentera, or Tinjis Altera, the other Tangier according to some historians.

==== Caetaria ====
In the Playa de Getares, just twenty meters from the coast, remains of buildings and pools for the manufacture of garum have been found. In addition to these structures, toponymy allows to locate the city of Caetaria, Cetaria or Cetraria, a name that comes etymologically from ketothereía or "place of cetaceans", and from where the current name of Getares would come from, documented as Xetares in the rhymed chronicle of Alfonso XI of Castile in the 14th century. The archaeological evidence allows for the dating of the Cetaria remains to the interval between the 1st and 5th centuries. It also suggests that this was a period during which the fishing industry in the area was significantly disrupted, potentially as a result of the prevalence of barbarian raids in the region.

==== Portus Albus ====
In the 1960s, the remains of two amphora manufacturing furnaces were discovered to the north of the city, adjacent to Playa de El Rinconcillo. These furnaces were part of an industrial complex that included at least two additional potteries, which were uncovered through private excavations. The city of Portus Albus, mentioned in the Antonine Itinerary as a mansion located six miles from Carteia and identified by some scholars as a small village whose economy was based on fishing and salt production, may have been discovered in this northern area. This is based on the discovery of structures for saltworks in the mid-20th century, which could be considered a complementary industry to the garum manufacturing industries of Iulia Traducta and Cetaria.

== Middle Ages ==
=== Barbarians and Byzantium ===
During the last years of the Western Roman Empire barbarian incursions reached the Strait region. The Mauritanians in 172 to 175 during the rule of Marcus Aurelius and in the period 193 to 211 with Septimius Severus ravaged the area. In 280 being Emperor Gallienus there was the passage of the Suebi, Germanic and Franks. In 429 the Vandals, in a number of 80,000 according to the sources of the time, passed the Strait of Gibraltar to settle in the territories of ancient Carthage. One of the ports used was that of Iulia Traducta but also that of Carteia. According to the chronicles, before moving on to Africa, they seized all the ships they found in the area, stocked up on provisions and destroyed those installations that could represent a future danger in the form of a new invasion, especially the port and the shipyards. There is hardly any archaeological evidence from this period, which leads us to believe that the area was practically unpopulated for at least two centuries. The southern part of Hispania was controlled by the Suebi until the arrival of the Visigoths in 454.

Gothic control in the southern fringe of the peninsula was maintained until 557 when the Byzantine Empire occupied the region in its attempt to recover the ancient Western Roman Empire. The presence in the city was scarce and there are archaeological references such as the discovery of a Visigothic-Byzantine cemetery in the Villa Vieja of the city, and of a Byzantine chalice in the surroundings of the later Aljama Mosque (later Arab sources indicate that a mosque was built on the site of a pre-existing church), also in the Villa Vieja. In any case, the Byzantine presence in this area of Andalusia was very limited. The Byzantines remained in the region until 622, the year in which the Visigoths returned to control the area.

=== Arab period and foundation of the city ===
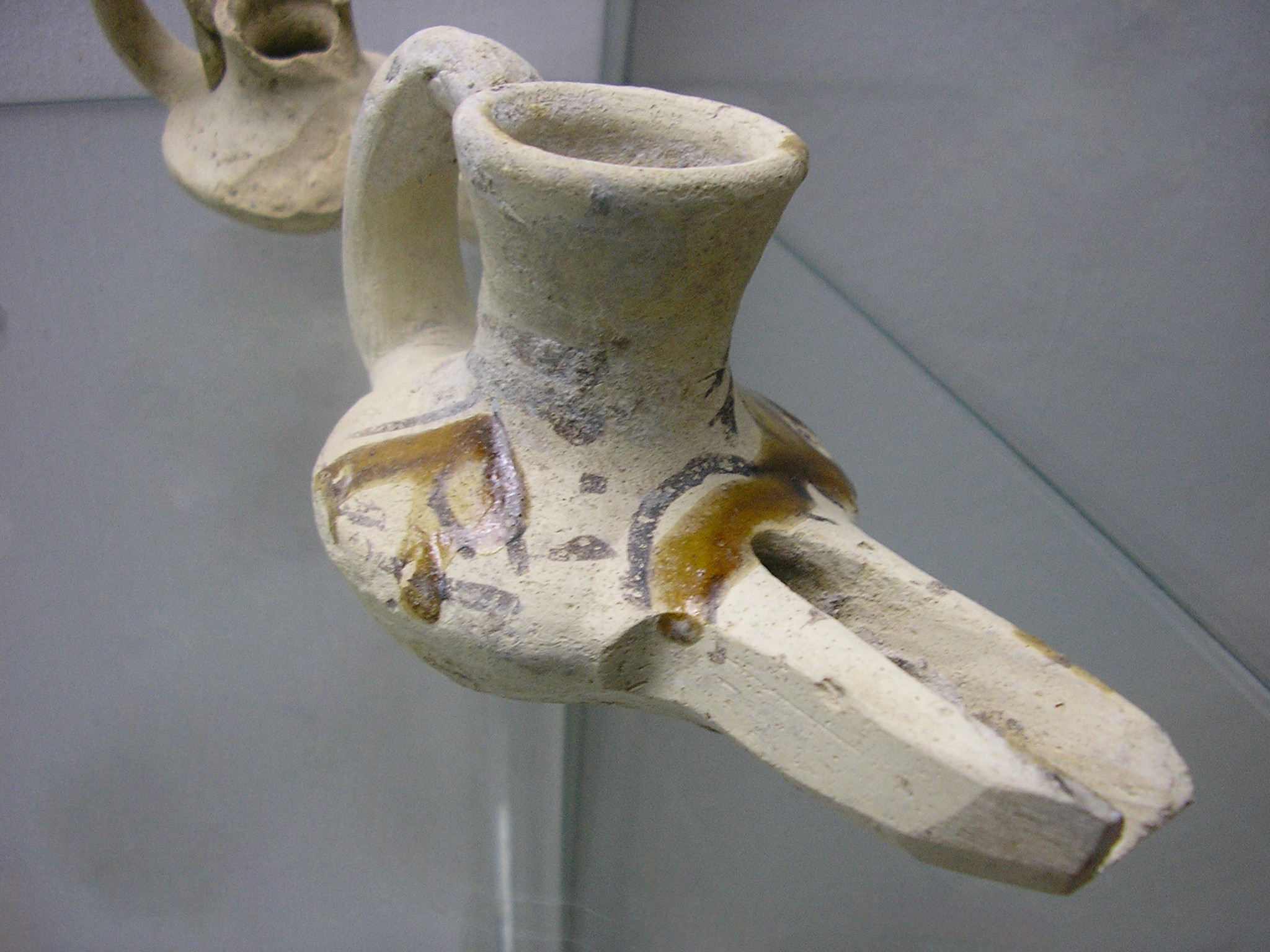
Arabian lamp found in Algeciras.

In 711 the Arab troops commanded by Tarik landed on the Iberian Peninsula and, after occupying the rock of Gibraltar (Ghebel Tarik or Mount Tarik) and the city of Carteia, arrived near the city of Algeciras. Here they established a base on the Isla Verde leaving a small detachment and the favorite of Tarik called Umm Hakim, which gave name to the place (Al Yazirat Umm Hakim or island of Humm Hakim). After the first days of the troops on the peninsula and after noting the little opposition from the Hispanics, the camp was moved to land, and with the name of Al-Yazira al-Jadra, the Isla Verde, they established the bases of the new city.

Since its foundation it was a fundamental city for the Muslim cause as it was the main gateway to Europe from Africa and soon the city saw its number of inhabitants grow mainly with Arab soldiers passing through for the war.

The city was the scene of Berber revolts during the second half of the 8th century. Thus, in 741 the emir of al-Andalus asked the Syrian nobleman Balch for help in putting down a Berber revolt against the central power. These insurrections took place due to the non-fulfillment of the agreements by which the Berbers were to receive plots of land with which to settle in the peninsula. The nobleman brought with him about 6500 soldiers through the port of al-Yazirat, the emir of al-Andalus asked that the main nobles remained in the city as a guarantee that the Syrian was not going to occupy any land but simply to help in the fight. Once finished this Balch knew that his nobles had not been well treated during their confinement in the city and marched towards Cordoba where he killed the emir.

=== Emirate of Cordoba ===
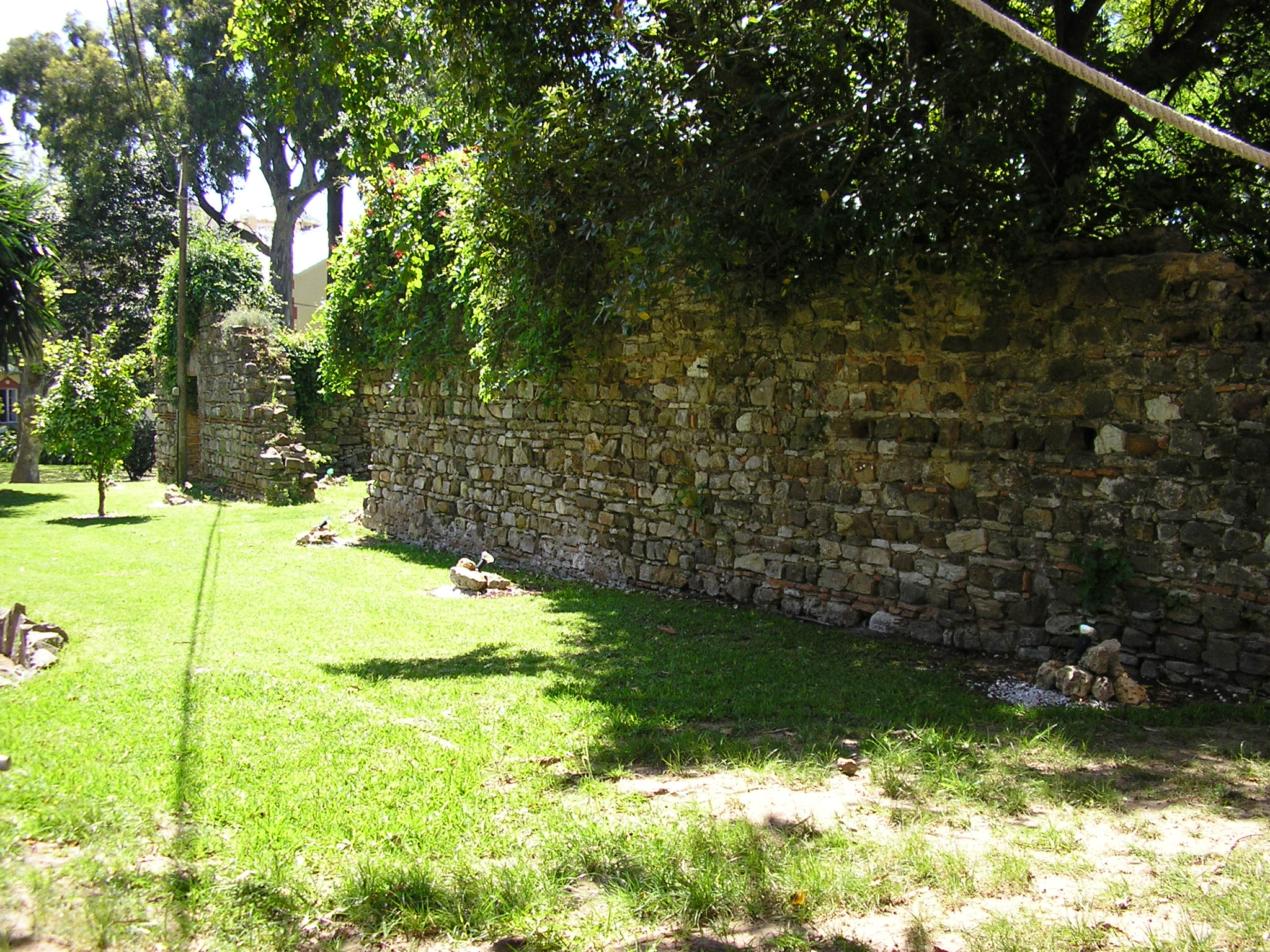
The 8th century Aljama Mosque, burned by Vikings in 859, was rebuilt with doors made of wood from a captured Viking ship.

In 755 the Umayyad prince Abd al-Rahman arrived in al-Andalus to proclaim himself independent emir of the country. Abd al-Rahman I built the Aljama Mosque in the city, the work of Abd-Allah ben Jálid. In the following years there were numerous Berber uprisings in the southern highlands of al-Andalus, thus several walis of the city confronted the central power even one of them, Rizq ben al-Numan to take the city of Seville in 760.

Sometime unidentified by sources in 859 Viking troops aboard 62 drakkars under the command of the warlords Hastein and Björn Ragnarsson besieged the city for three days and stormed it. After plundering the houses of the notables, they set fire to the Aljama Mosque and the Mosque of the Flags. Reorganized in the vicinity of the medina, the Yazirids managed to recapture the city and put the invaders to flight by capturing two of their ships. In the following years the mosques were rebuilt, the doors of which were made of wood from captured drakkars, and the walls were rebuilt.

In the year 879 Yahyá al-Yazirí revolted in the city as part of the revolts that at that time led by Muladí and Mozarabs against the high tributes that the emir of Córdoba forced them to pay. The aim of these insurrections was to create an independent state in the Penibetic mountains. Muhammad I sent to the city Háshim Ibn Al-Aziz with an army that subdued Al-Jazirí and took him to Cordoba. But it would be other dissidents who would put the emir in check. Lope Ibn Mandaril and Ben Abi Azara from Algeciras joined the powerful rebel chieftain of the Malaga mountains, Omar ibn Hafsún, against the caliphate power.

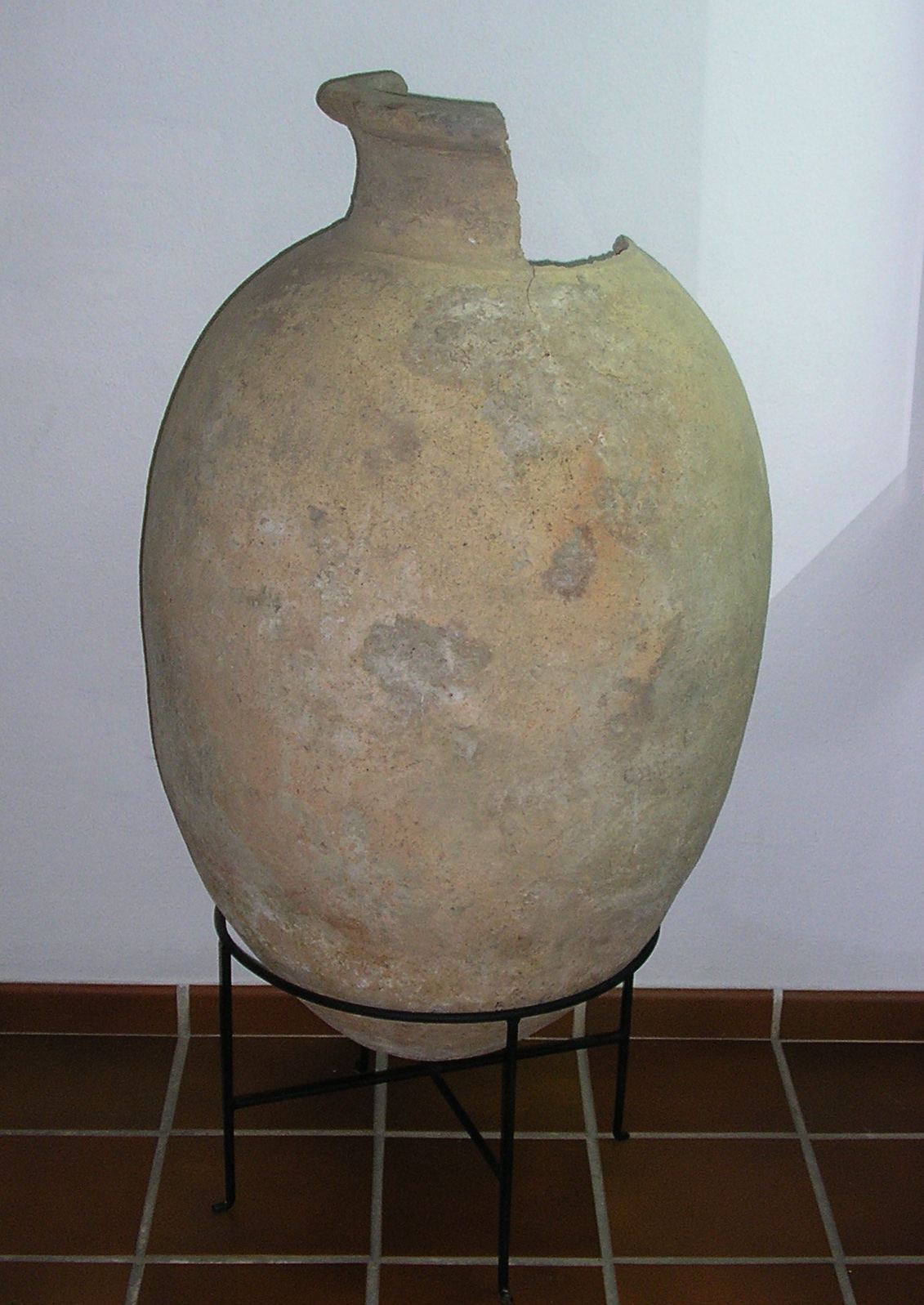
Arab jar from the Villa Nueva of the city.

Although from Cordoba governors loyal to the emirate were appointed in the city in the castles of the mountains insurrections were constant. This situation continued until 888 when the city of Algeciras revolted against the emir and expelled the governor. From that moment Hafsún began to use the port of the city to trade with the Maghreb. In the following years the city passed from one side to another. When Abd al-Rahman III came to power in 914, a large part of the south of al-Andalus did not recognize his authority, so he decided to attack with his army the castles of the Ronda mountain range and entered Algeciras where he set up his base of operations and built a shipyard to repair the ships captured from Hafsún. It was from this city that he launched the final attack against Omar, who died in the castle of Bobastro; a few years later Abd al-Rahman definitively pacified his kingdom and appointed himself caliph.

=== Caliphate of Cordoba ===
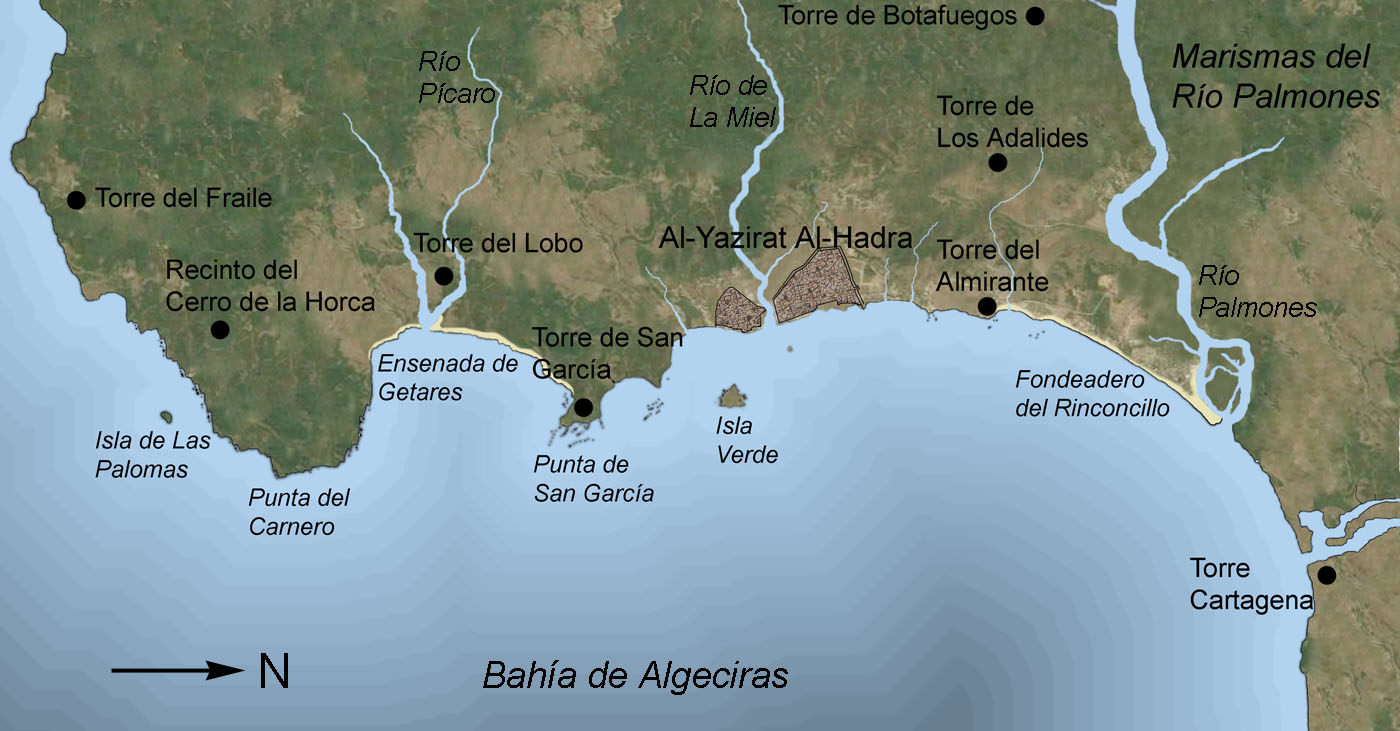
Sites of crenellated towers and fortifications near Al-Jazira al-Khadra.

Abd al-Rahman III was succeeded by Al-Hakam II and his son Hisham II, who, being a minor, appointed his prime minister Muhammad Ibn Abi Amir Al-Maafiri, born in a village near Algeciras and belonging to his Kora or province and known by all as Al-Mansur or Almanzor ("the victorious of God") as head of the government. Almanzor attacked Castilian cities, destroying León, Barcelona and Santiago de Compostela. In 1002 he was wounded in the battle of Calatañazor; the wound became infected and he died on August 10 in the castle of Medinaceli.

=== Taifa kingdoms, Almoravids and Almohads ===
Almanzor died in 1002, the Caliphate dismembered into a multitude of Taifa Kingdoms. In 1010 an army of Berbers from Cordoba confronted the troops of the central power in the vicinity of the city, defeating them and entering the city. There they killed all the men and captured the children and women. When Sulayman ibn al-Hakam arrived to the throne of Córdoba and distributed the territories among his allies, he gave the Cora of Algeciras to al-Qásim, thus forming the Taifa Kingdom of Algeciras. This lord of Algeciras was called to occupy the throne of Cordoba until he was assassinated by Idris I, his nephew, who marched on Algeciras, annexing it to his kingdom. However years later the sons of al-Qasim supported by troops loyal to his father took back the city proclaiming the Hammudid kingdom of Algeciras. This was governed by Muhámmad al-Qásim, son of the assassinated, who maintained a policy of support for the different Hammudid territories that undermined the meager economy of his own taifa. Muhámmad al-Qásim was succeeded in 1049 by his son Al-Qásim ben Muhámmad who saw how Al-Mu'tamid's kingdom of Seville was taking the taifas of Ronda, Morón, Arcos and Jerez and coming dangerously close to his kingdom. The city of Algeciras was finally surrounded in 1055 by land and sea until it finally fell to the Sevillian troops.

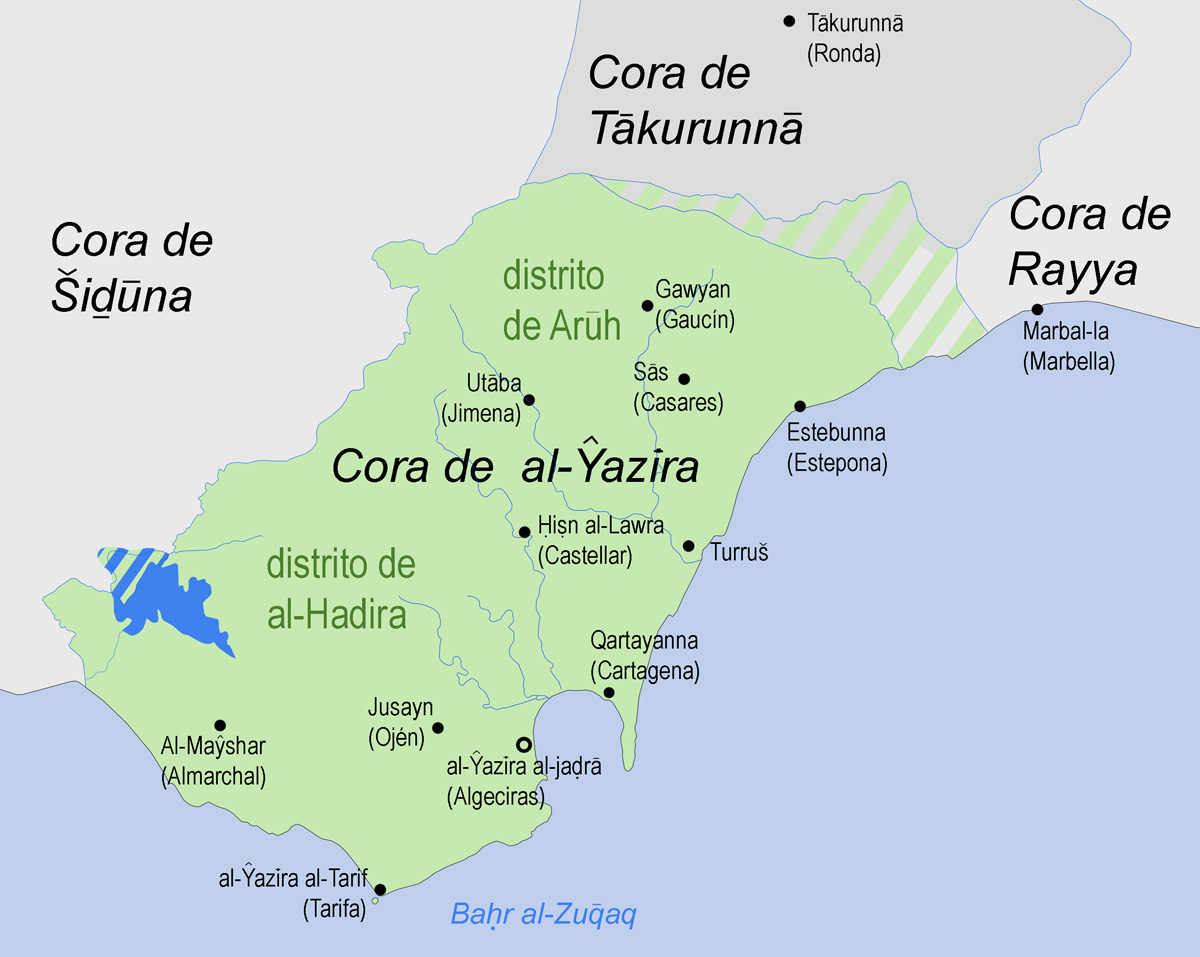
The extension of the Taifa kingdom of Algeciras corresponded to that of the ancient cora or province of Al-Yazirat.

Al-Mutamid of Seville had to ask for help from the Almoravids of Yusuf ibn Tasufin in 1085 to be able to face the King of Leon, Alfonso VI, who was endangering the northern borders of al-Andalus.

One of the promises made by the Sevillian to Yúsuf was that he would give him the city of Algeciras after the evacuation of its citizens. However, time passed and this was not fulfilled; seeing that the North African that the king of Seville did not give him the city, he disembarked at night in the shipyards with part of his troops and ordered the rest to surround the city. Seeing that it was impossible to keep the square, the king of Seville ordered the governor of the city, his own son, to leave it.

Once Algeciras was in the hands of Yusuf, it served as a base of operations for the North Africans for the conquest of the different Andalusian kingdoms, as well as Seville and Granada. The reign of the Almoravids was never popular and the people of Algeciras surrendered the city to the Almohads in 1147 due to dissatisfaction with their previous rulers. From there they undertook the conquest of al-Andalus, unifying it under an iron conception of the faith of Mohammed until they were defeated in 1212 in the Battle of Las Navas de Tolosa, a moment that marked the rapid decline of the Almohads, until in 1231 Algeciras rose up against them supporting Ibn Hud who, from Murcia, aspired to restore the ancient Taifa kingdoms.

=== The Merinid period and the conquest of Alfonso XI ===
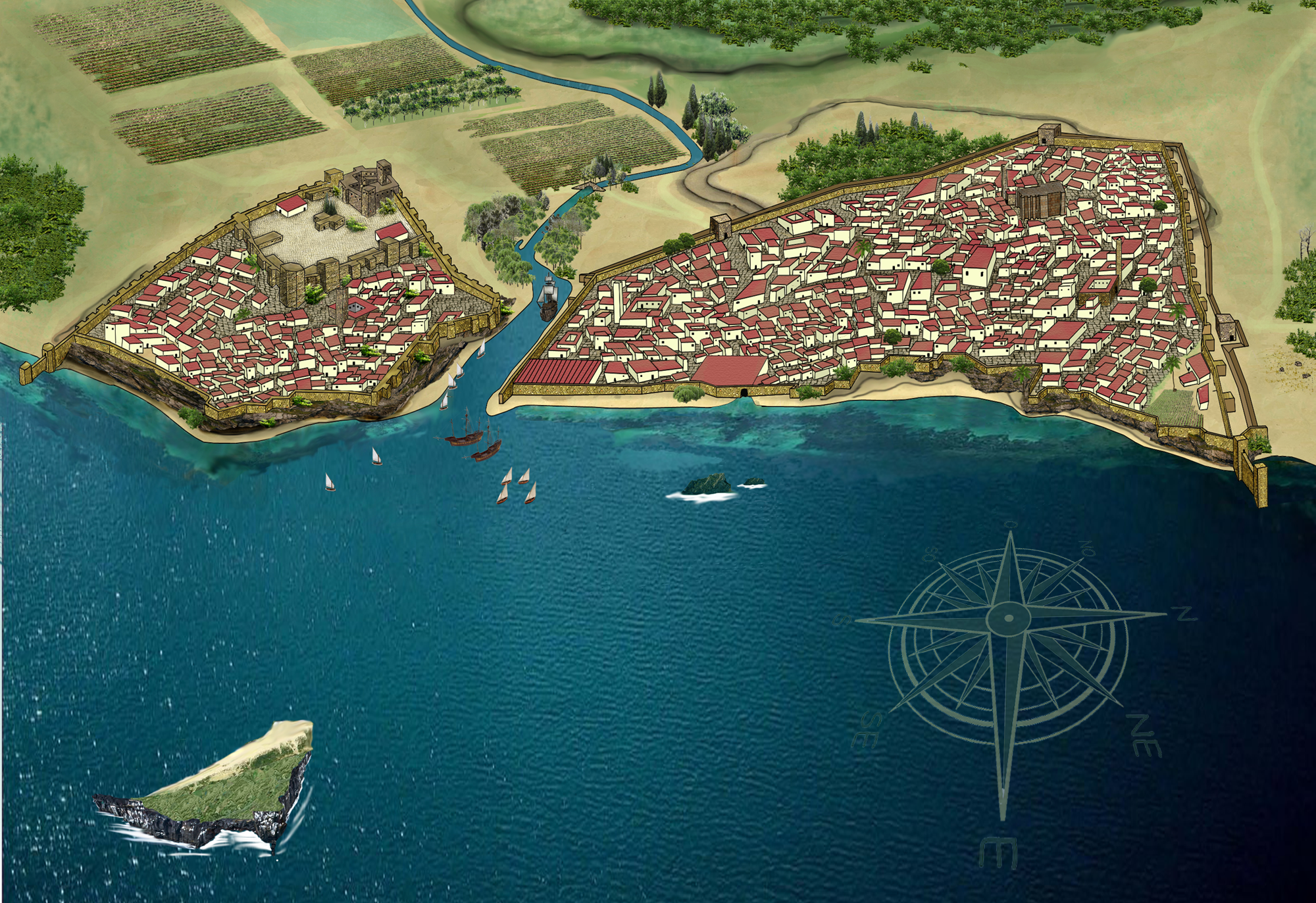
Ideal recreation of the Arab city, on the left the Villa Nueva Merinid and on the right the Villa Vieja Andalusian. Between the two the Río de la Miel with the port at its mouth.

In the mid-13th century, the Nasrid kingdom of Granada was founded, stretching from Almería to Algeciras. In the face of the Castilian advance, the Granadines asked for help from the Benimerines of North Africa who landed in Algeciras in 1275 with 17,000 knights. They occupied the city and the surrounding territory with the permission of the King of Granada and on the condition that they defend the frontier, thus making the city the capital of their European dominions.

Faced with the Merinid threat in 1278, Alfonso X arrived in the city with the intention of taking it. He blockaded its port and ordered the prince Don Pedro to do the same by land. The siege was long and hard and from a hill near the medina, the Castilians suffered hardships for more than a year while the Algeciras were reinforced by sea from nearby Ibralar. After this time the emir Abu Yusuf sent his squadron to defeat the Christian squadron and had all the soldiers beheaded. On the Castilian side, the infante Don Pedro realized that he could not maintain the siege and abandoned the camp with his men. Seeing that from the place where the Christians had settled, Yusuf could do much damage to the city in the future, he ordered the construction of a new villa known as al-Binyia or Villa Nueva in the Christian chronicles. The construction of this villa was completed in 1285 and consisted of a strong wall with a moat and four monumental gates, a fortress and a main mosque and was separated from the Villa Vieja or Al-Madina by the Río de la Miel. In 1294 the Grenadians recovered Algeciras and Gibraltar from the Merinids; however, on July 30, 1309 Ferdinand IV laid Siege of Algeciras by land with the help of Fez, while the Crown of Aragon laid siege by sea. In early 1310 the King of Castile negotiated to lift the siege of the city if the Nasrid would surrender Bedmar and Quesada to him.

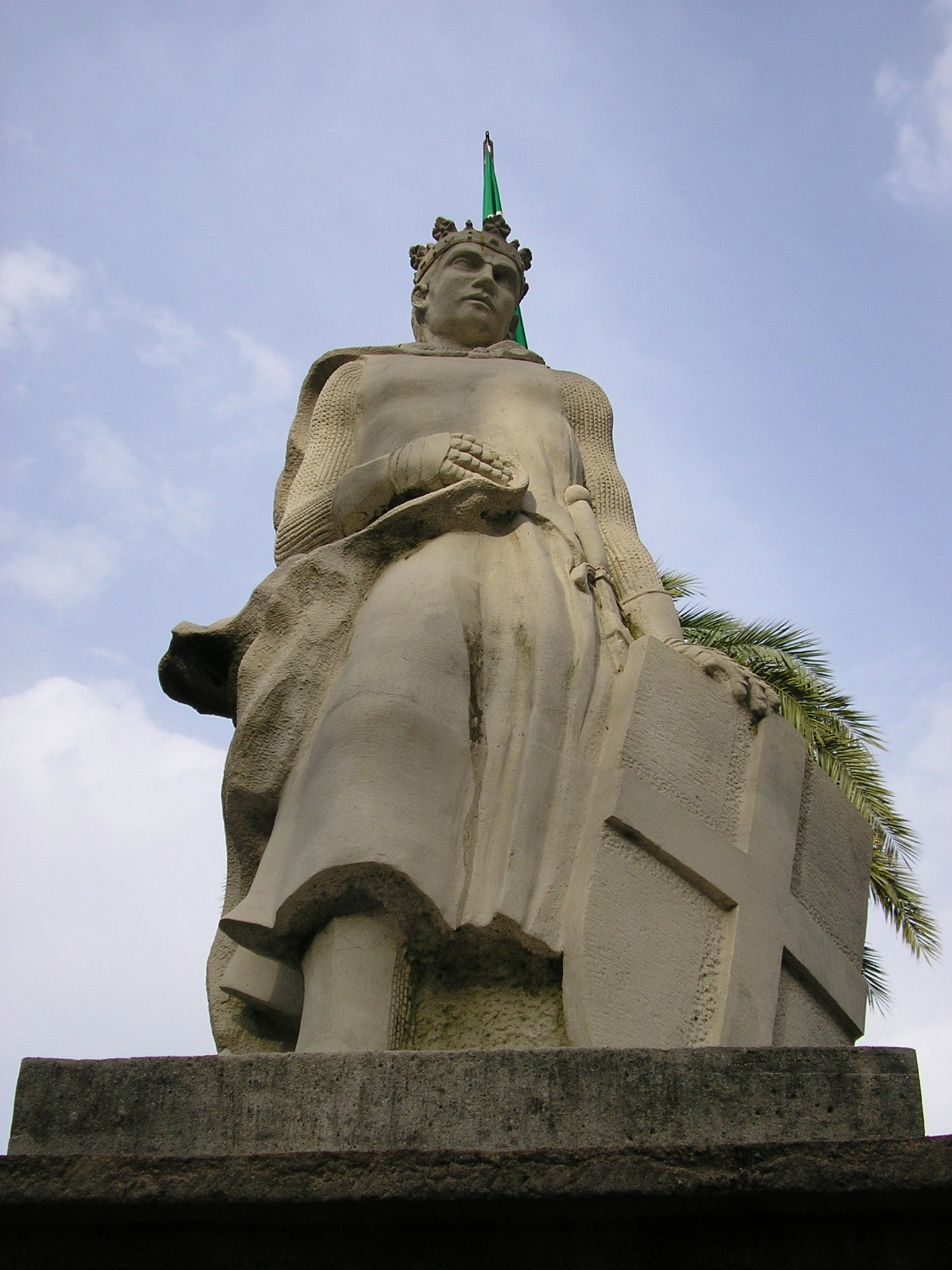
Alfonso XI, the Just, King of Castile, was born in Salamanca on August 13, 1311; son of King Ferdinand IV and father of King Peter I the Cruel. He died in the siege of Gibraltar on March 26, 1350 of the Black Death. This sculpture of Blas Infante Avenue is from 1971 and was made by Carlos Gómez de Avellaneda.

From 1338 the Merinids undertook different campaigns against the border with Castile that forced Alfonso XI to take the decision to besiege Algeciras being this city the point of entry of the troops from North Africa. In 1340, Alfonso XI defeated Abu-l-Hassan in the vicinity of Tarifa in the famous Battle of Río Salado. In 1342 the troops of Castile, Portugal, Aragon and Genoa arrived to the city together with European crusaders and with the support of the King of England, France and the Holy See, laying Siege of Algeciras. During more than twenty months of siege the people of Algeciras were supported by sea by the Merinids of Gibraltar until Alfonso XI decided to set up a maritime siege consisting of chains and logs from Isla Verde to the Playa de Los Ladrillos. This siege prevented the entrance of any ship to the city. Faced with the impossibility of maintaining the city, the people of Algeciras had to ask for support troops from Granada. The coalition of Granada and the Merinids of Gibraltar met the troops commanded by Castile in the vicinity of the Palmones River, defeating Alfonso XI and forcing the city to capitulate. On March 26, 1344, the Villa Vieja was given to the infante Don Juan Manuel and on the 28th, Palm Sunday, Alfonso XI entered the Villa Nueva and consecrated its main mosque to Santa María de la Palma. The Castilian king added to his titles that of king of Algeciras.

=== Arab reconquest and destruction of the city ===
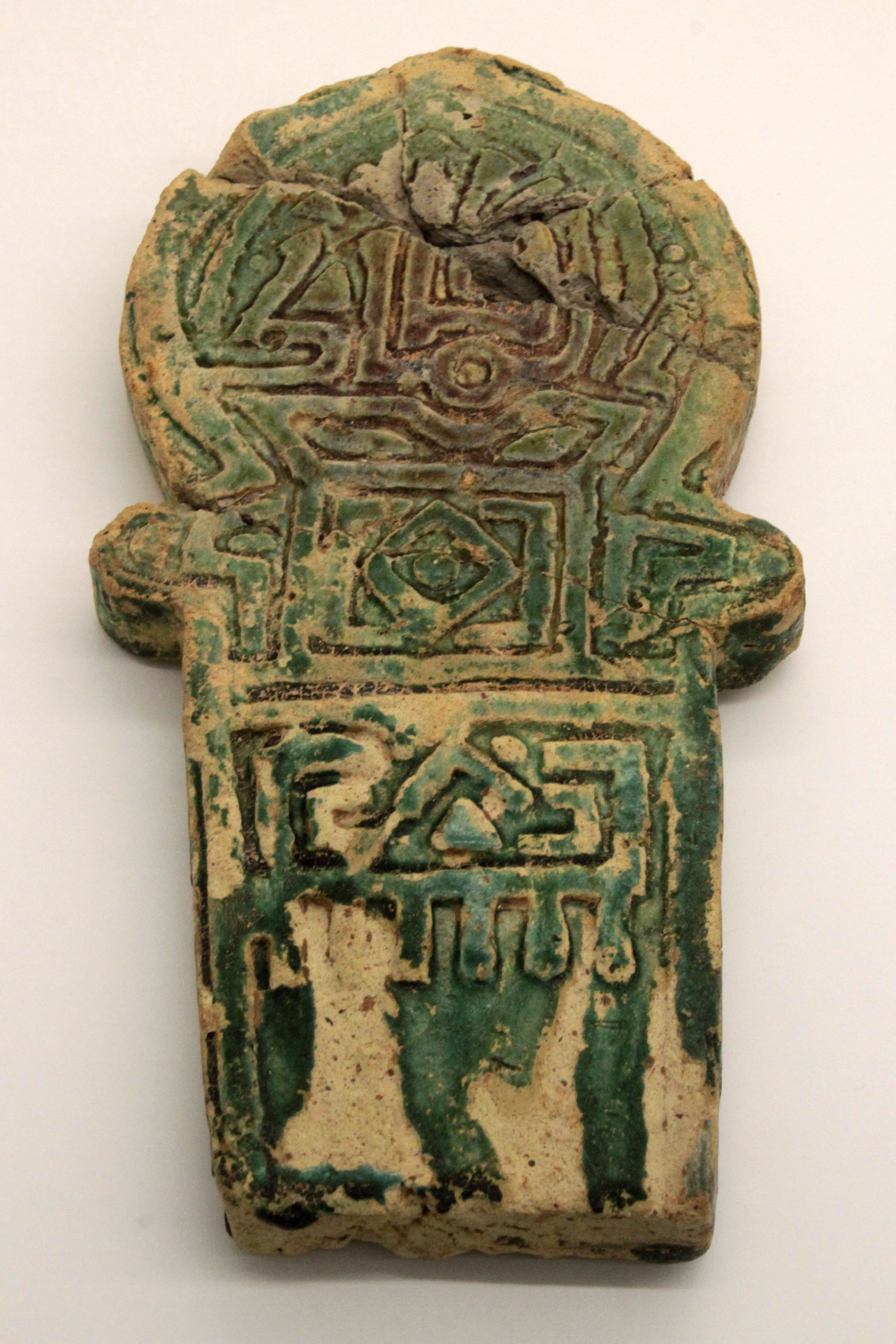
Merinid stele located in the cemetery of the Fuerte de Santiago, and dated from the 13th century.

Despite the constant attempts of Castile to repopulate the city (Charter of Algeciras of 1345) it fell into crisis especially after the death of Alfonso XI while he was besieging Gibraltar. The role of the city as a frontier territory and the weakening of the Kingdom of Castile due to dynastic struggles meant that the garrisons of the city were scarce to defend it against an eventual Arab incursion. The city was in this situation in 1369 when Muhammad V of Granada reconquered the city. The Granada intended to recover its former splendor by repopulating it and rebuilding the walls, but only ten years later Castile had recovered from its internal struggles. The Nasrid king then realized that he could not maintain the square for long and decided to destroy it in 1379 so that it would not fall into Christian hands again.

The city was completely razed to the ground and all its inhabitants had to leave this dangerous frontier territory. In 1462, with the conquest of Gibraltar, the former boundaries of Las Algeciras passed to this city.

== Modern and Contemporary Ages ==
=== Repopulation ===
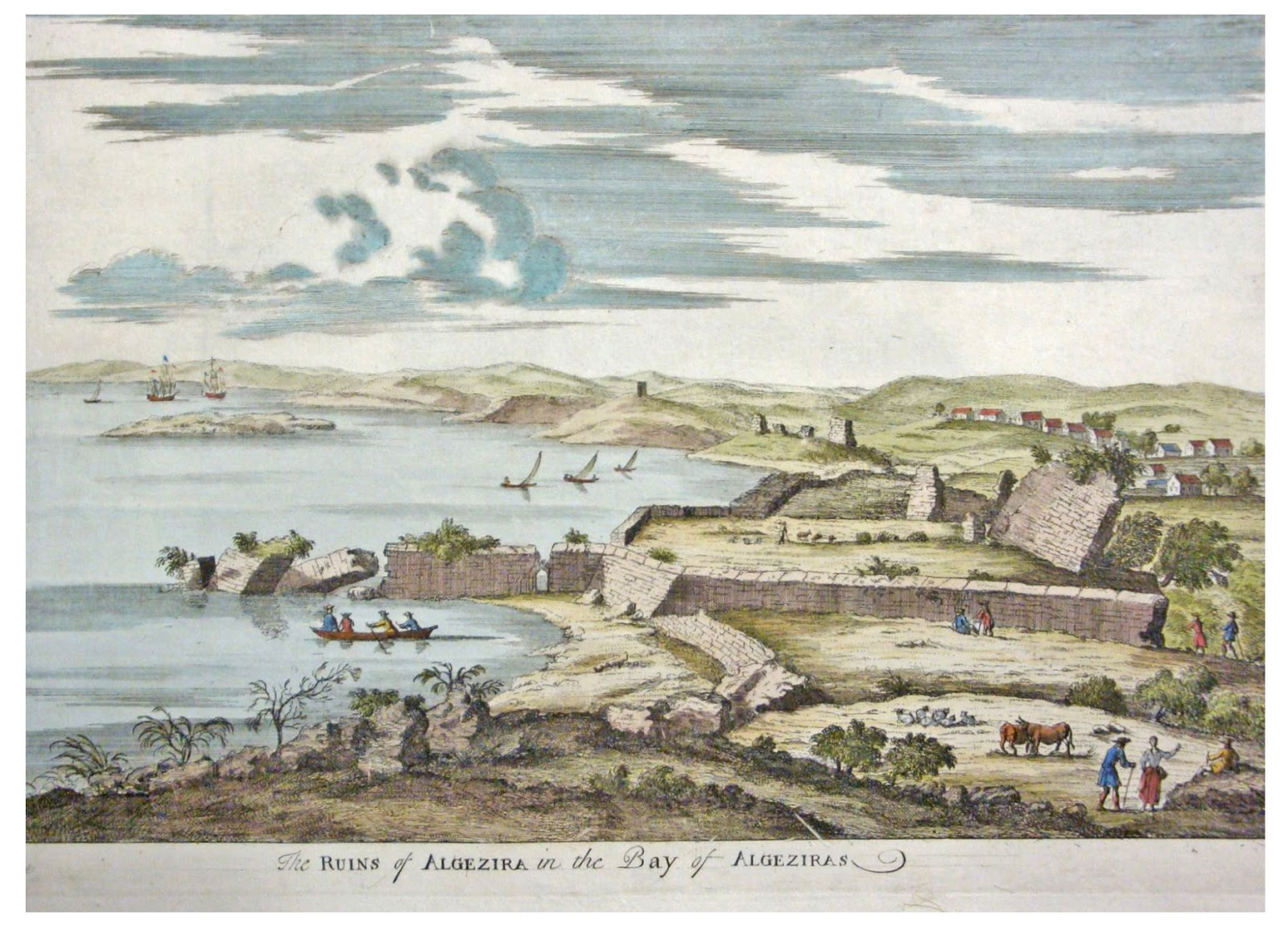
18th century engraving of Algeciras and the ruins of the old Arab medina.

Algeciras was refounded in 1704 by Spanish refugees from Gibraltar following the territory's capture by Anglo-Dutch forces during the War of the Spanish Succession. The refugees settled in the ruins of the city's Arab medina, and in 1705 Algeciras was described as "a heap of stones... only a few hovels scattered here and there, amidst an infinity of ruins." The place selected for this were the surroundings of the then chapel of San Bernardo, which since then would be called Our Lady of Europe to deposit in it the image of the Virgin venerated in Gibraltar and was rescued from plunder. Though the refugees intended on eventually returning to Gibraltar, such plans were abandoned following the 1713 Peace of Utrecht, in which Spain ceded the territory to Britain.

The refounded city's buildings were initially provisional, with the medina's stones being used to construct new structures. The cobblestones of the streets were also reused, so that part of the old Arab roads were reflected in the plan of the city. In 1721, Jorge de Verboom, 1st Marquess of Verboom drew up plans of the city, the Arab ruins and models of how the new streets should be built. Trazado de Verboom consisted of straight streets crossed in parallel forming closed blocks. He also contemplated the construction of a fortified city in Algeciras in case it was attacked by a foreign power. Of the layout of the city, only the northern part of the Villa Nueva (Ancha, Sevilla, Alfonso XI and perpendicular streets), with a grid layout, has been preserved.

In 1726 the return of the old terms of Algeciras to the city was requested and from the Council of Castile a writ was sent to San Roque so that these conditions were fulfilled. The city of San Roque refused and began a series of allegations that ended up putting the Royal Order on hold. Four years later and in 1734 two claims were presented and again they fell on deaf ears due to the opposition of the governors of San Roque who saw how the rights of their city could be reduced. The arguments of San Roque were mainly of a patriotic nature, thus they considered that the cities of Algeciras, Los Barrios and San Roque could not be separated because they were in effect one, that of Gibraltar.

=== Independence of San Roque ===
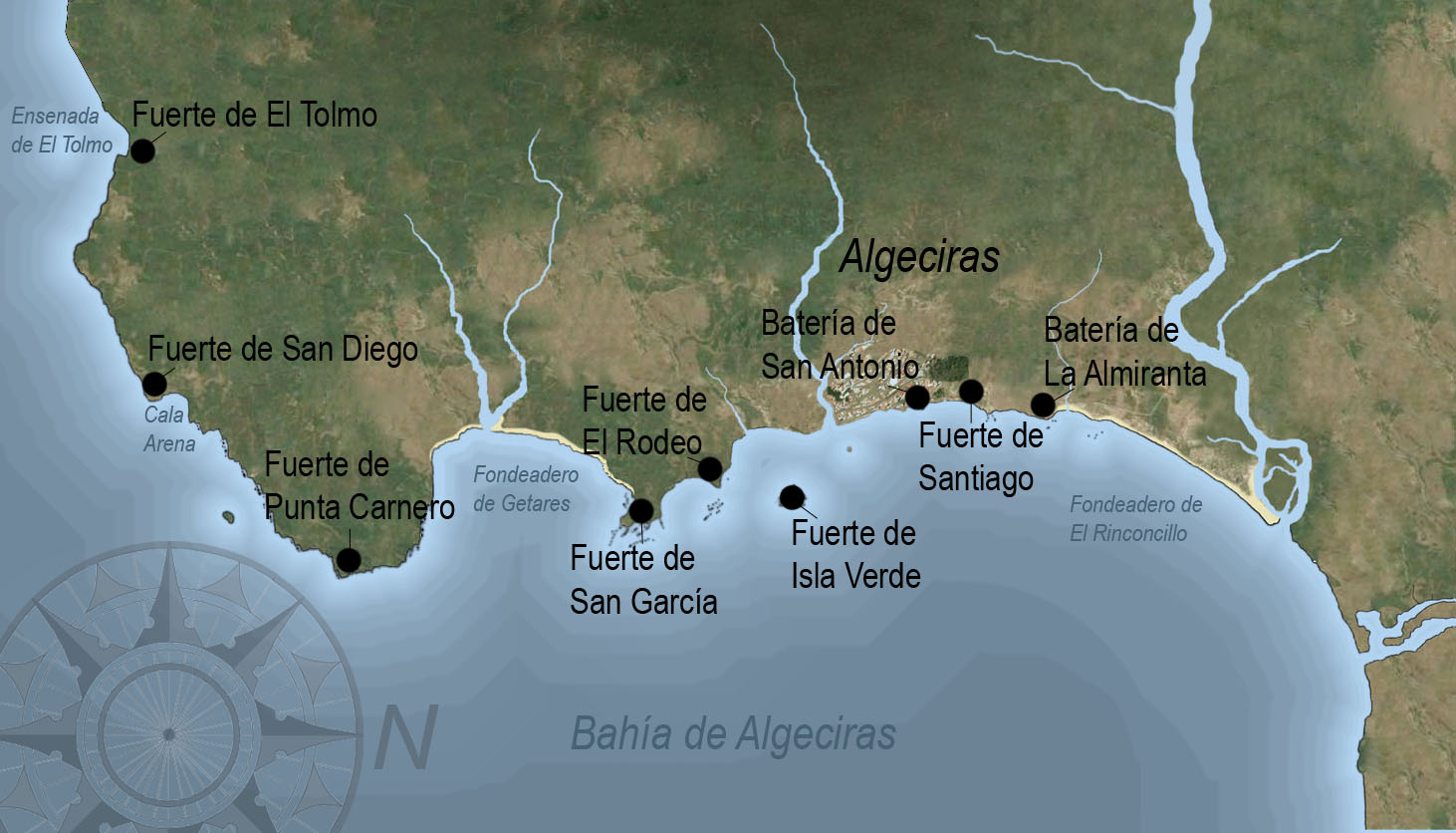
Location of the 18th century military forts in Algeciras, Torre del Almirante, Fuerte de Santiago, Batería de San Antonio, Fuerte de Isla Verde, Torre de El Rodeo, Fuerte de San García, Fuerte de Punta Carnero, Fuerte de San Diego and Fuerte de El Tolmo.

From 1751 the general commander of the Campo de Gibraltar, Francisco de Paula Bucareli, undertook various actions aimed at the municipal independence of the cities of the Campo. Thus, by the Cédula of February 9, 1755, following the request of the General, Algeciras was granted the title of city, its first mayor being Francisco Bermúdez Salcedo. In the territorial division of the former boundaries of Gibraltar, which also included the city of Los Barrios, it was decided to give Algeciras a smaller territory than the other two towns because its port was an advantage over the other two cities. However, the use of the mountains would be joint for the three cities. During the following years the Army Corps of Engineers built streets and squares. Time and archaeological excavations have shown that the urban layout of the city of the time follows the layout of the streets, walls and moats of the medina; thus the houses located on Teniente Miranda Street, for example, have their back walls always leaning against the city wall. The urbanization process of the city was enormous in these times, the first Plaza Alta was built and the aqueduct known as "Los Arcos" that brought water to the city from a nearby spring in 1777.

In June 1779 Spain declared war on Great Britain and initiated the ultimately unsuccessful Great Siege of Gibraltar. During the siege, Algeciras was the base of operations of the Spanish squadron under Antonio Barceló. The protection of Spanish warships was provided by the towers of Santiago, San Antonio and Isla Verde, which were part of a strong defense system built in the 1730s by Verboom.

In 1801 a French squadron bound for Cádiz had to take refuge in Algeciras to avoid being intercepted by the Royal Navy. A British squadron under James Saumarez attacked the sheltering French squadron, which nearby Spanish forts assisted in repelling. During the battle, which became known as the First Battle of Algeciras, the ship of the line Hannibal was captured and the British withdrew. However, Saumarez's squadron defeated a Franco-Spanish squadron shortly afterwards in the Second Battle of Algeciras, bringing the Algeciras campaign to an end. France built a ship called Algeciras (its original French name was Algésiras), which took part in the Battle of Trafalgar, in memory of the first battle.

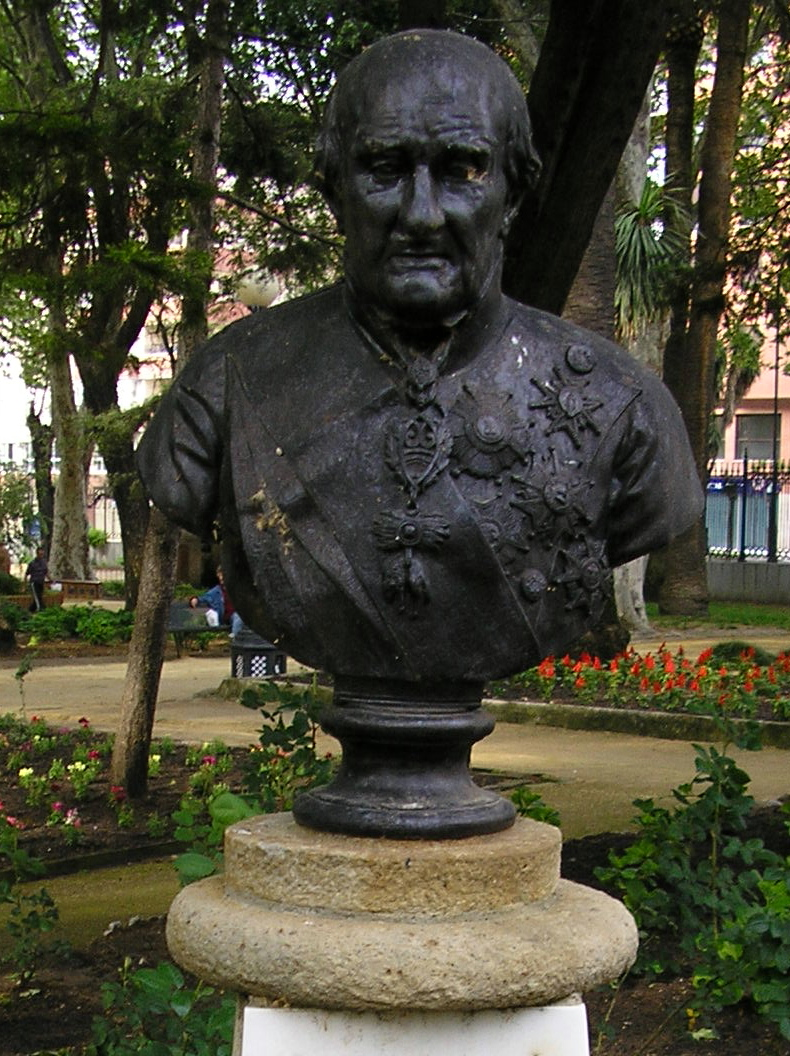
General Castaños, Francisco Javier Castaños Aragorri Urioste y Olavide, born in Madrid on April 22, 1758 and died in the same city on September 24, 1852, victor in the battle of Bailen in 1808. Of this bust, located in the Paseo Cristina, it is said that it was made with the bronze of the French cannons captured in that battle.

In 1802 Francisco Javier Castaños was appointed Lieutenant General of the Command of the Campo de Gibraltar and moved it to Algeciras because he considered it a more favorable place to conduct military operations. General Castaños carried out numerous works in the city through the Corps of Engineers, among them the remodeling of the Plaza Alta (1807) in which he placed a huge obelisk that was to be topped with a bust of Manuel Godoy and which was demolished in 1926 and the paving of numerous streets.

=== Independence War ===
General Castaños, accompanied by the garrison of Campo de Gibraltar, volunteers from Algeciras, San Roque and Gibraltar, went north to prevent the penetration of the French in Andalusia. This expedition ended in the famous battle of Bailén.

In February 1810, the French general Victor de Fay de La Tour-Maubourg settled in San Roque and sent two hundred troops to Algeciras with the intention of taking the city, but a group of citizens supported from the sea with a British gunboat attacked the French troops and they decided to retreat. There was no time for retaliation because three days later the towns of the Serranía de Ronda rose up in arms and the French had to abandon their posts in San Roque to try to quell the uprisings. From the Campo de Gibraltar militias were sent to Tarifa with the news of the imminent arrival of new Napoleonic troops from Cadiz. These militias were defeated but the French had to return to Chiclana due to the casualties suffered.

In 1811, French troops again approached the city but were defeated at Jimena de la Frontera by General Francisco Ballesteros and the volunteers of the Getares Riflemen Company. After the battle, Ballesteros and his troops attempted to gain entry to Gibraltar but were rebuffed by Governor Colin Campbell. Taking advantage of this situation, the French general Godinot capture Algeciras while its citizens took refuge on Isla Verde; after taking supplies and valuables, the French withdrew, never to return.

=== African War ===
In 1859 and 1860 the African War between Spain and Morocco took place. The Spanish army that was to settle in the northern part of Morocco left from Algeciras. This war brought to the city a transfer of people that helped a lot to the meager local economy, but it also brought a lot of pain and misery. Many people from Algeciras died in the war, some of them have streets named after them in the city: Ensign Villalta Medina, Commander Gómez Ortega, etc. In addition, the presence of the troops in the city coincided with an outbreak of cholera that wreaked havoc especially among the wounded who were crowded in the military hospital (see: Cholera epidemics in Spain).

In 1873, the city having a great federalist influence, Algeciras was proclaimed as an independent canton, taking advantage of the confusion created in the Central Government after the proclamation of the First Republic. The canton of Algeciras remained until August 8 of the same year when the troops from Cadiz dissolved the Algeciras Volunteer Battalion.

=== Late 19th and early 20th century ===
Algeciras became from 1880 onwards an enclave of tourist interest for the British due to its proximity to Gibraltar. From this interest arose in the area of the Villa Vieja an important number of houses locally called the Chalecitos where wealthy Gibraltarians lived, some of these chalets are now part of the public facilities of the city as the municipal museum installed in the house of the Guardeses, the headquarters of the Commonwealth of Municipalities in the Villa Smith, etc. The arrival of the railroad (1892), from the hands of Anglo-Saxon investors, in those years favored the development of its port. Therefore, the germ of the current port of Algeciras were the first wooden docks used for the berthing of the steamers that crossed the Bay bound for Gibraltar. Public lighting was also installed (1891) at the behest of Mayor Emilio Santacana y Mensayas.

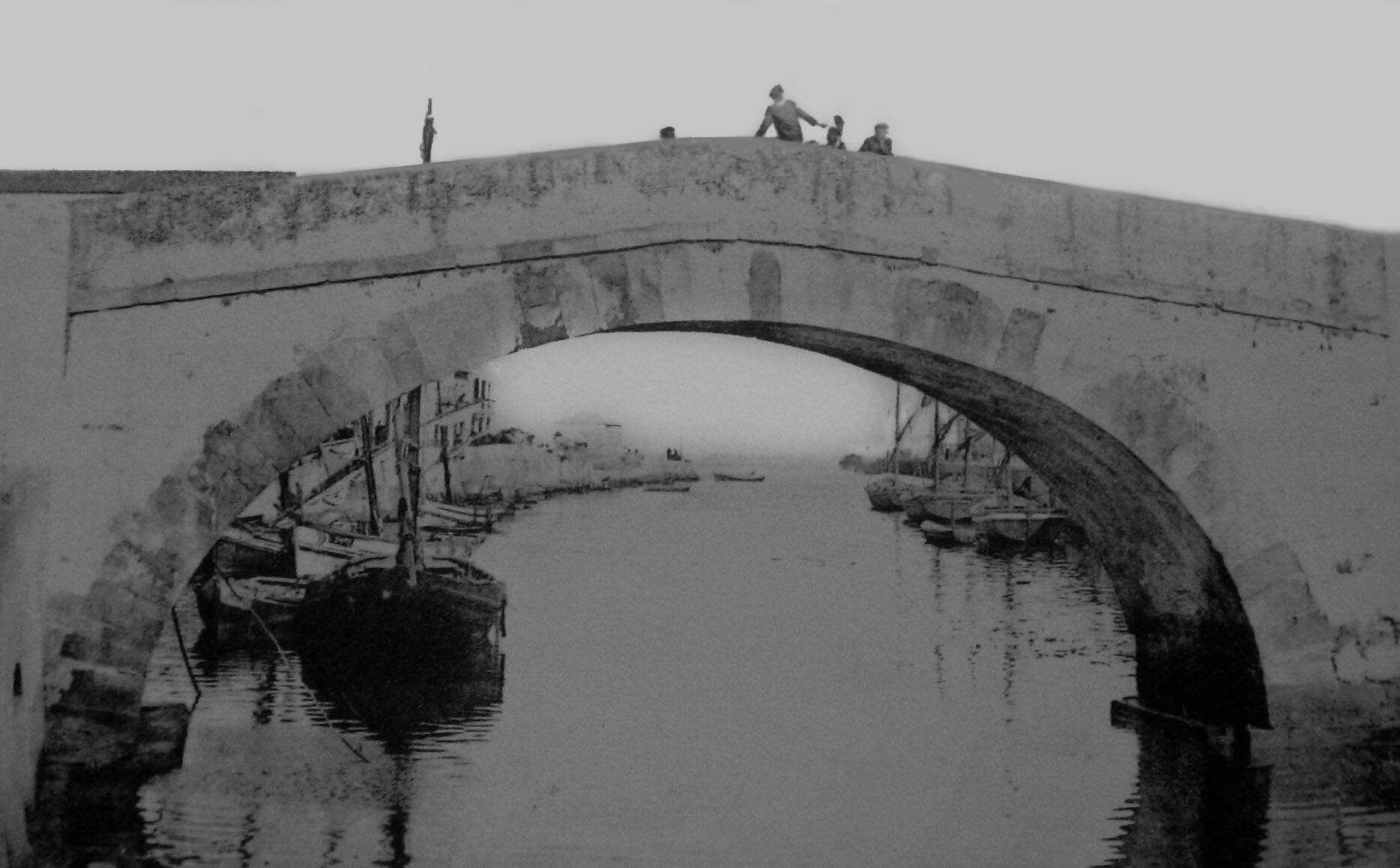
The Old Bridge over the Miel River.

In 1906, the Algeciras Conference was held in this city, dealing with the distribution of the surface of Africa. The pacifying objectives of the conference were never fulfilled and in fact the division of Morocco among the different European countries brought nothing but misery and war to that country, however the repercussions of the conference in the city were tremendously positive and in a certain way marked the future of the city. The international event revealed the numerous deficiencies of the city at the same time that it made evident the need of a strong city in the south of the peninsula that would diminish the economic strength of the colony of Gibraltar and at the same time could maintain commercial relations with the north of Africa, It is for this reason that in the same year of 1906 was created the Board of Works of the Port, precedent of the current Port Authority of the Bay of Algeciras, and that will develop a pattern of growth for the port based in a first place on the docks of Isla Verde, linked to land by a wooden bridge. The growth of the port, first supported by the stone of Galera, where the Hannibal would run aground in 1801, and then towards the interior of the Bay, would eventually give rise to the current Port of Algeciras, the most important port in Spain in terms of goods traffic and one of the most important in Europe.

=== Civil War ===
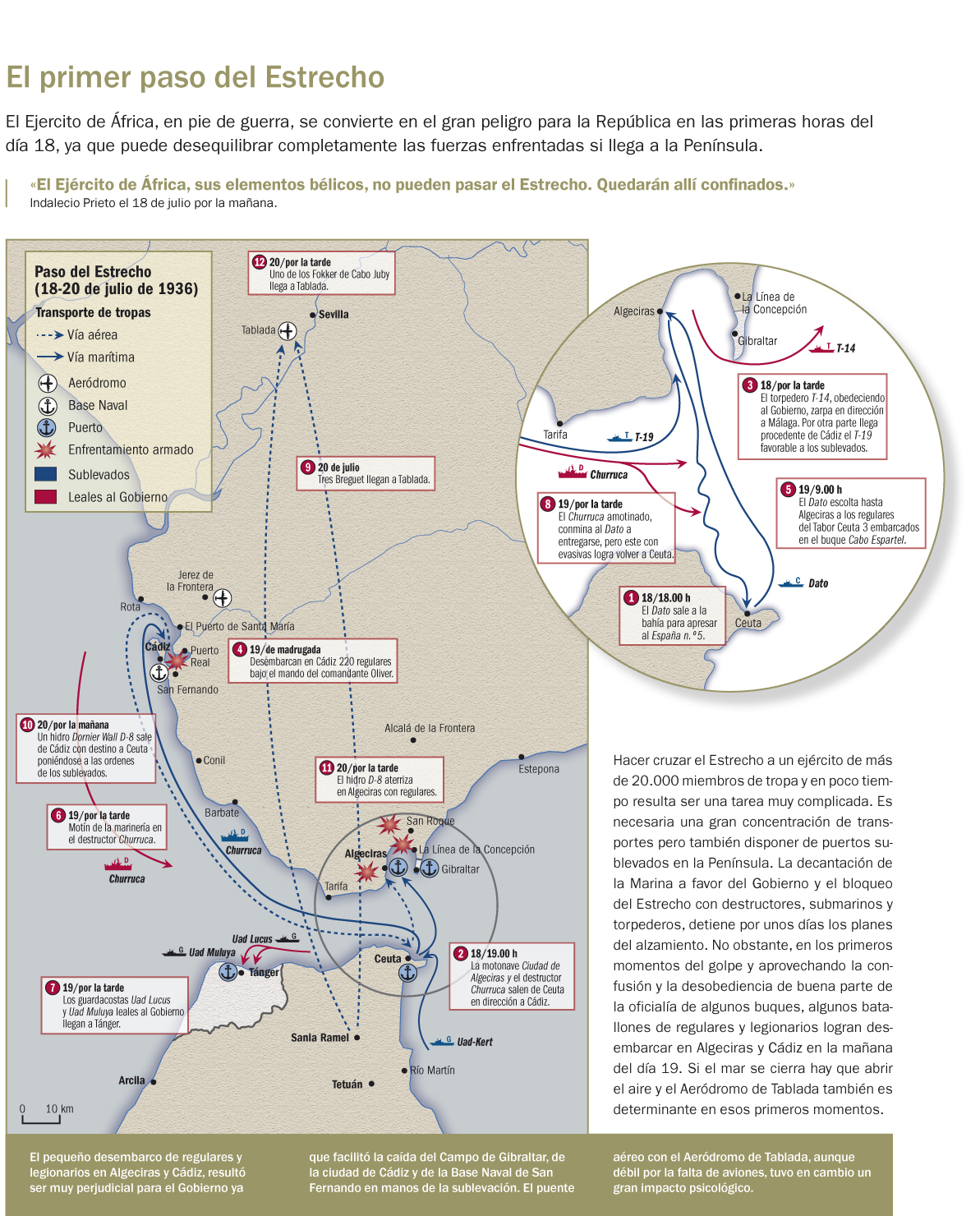
Infographic narrating the crossing of the Strait of Gibraltar by some rebel units of the Army of Africa between July 18 and 20, 1936.

In 1936, after the military uprising against the government of the Republic, Algeciras became the only possible port for the landing of troops from North Africa if they finally joined the uprising. Given the importance of the city at this time, the Republican mayor Salvador Montesinos decided to meet with the full city council and maintain communication with Madrid to await news.

On July 18, the Civil Guard commanded by Miguel Romero Garcia took the most important buildings of the city, telegraphs, radio and stationed part of its forces at the entrances of the city while preventing citizens loyal to the republic, fearful, to take arms from the barracks to defend the city. That same day Colonel Emilio March received orders from Gonzalo Queipo de Llano to declare a state of war; in a few hours the different garrisons of the city took over the public buildings and arrested the mayor and the government team. After taking the City Hall without resistance, the battalions of San Roque and La Línea lined up against the insurgents and this situation was maintained until the arrival of the troops from Ceuta.

In this way, Algeciras adhered almost from the beginning to the cause against the Republic. On the eve of the military uprising, when the rumors of an imminent military coup and possible civil confrontation were already public, the death threats of the republican union militias, made the families of the landowners of Algeciras to go into exile in Gibraltar. Immediately after the military coup, many people from Algeciras had to flee the city, mainly to Gibraltar, in the first weeks to avoid the executions and arrests that were carried out. The British authorities refused entry into Gibraltar to most of the exiles, who were held in refugee camps in the Neutral Field, allowing only those families to pass, such as landowners who fled before the coup, had resources to support themselves or those who were claimed by families living in Gibraltar and who were responsible for their maintenance to the British authorities.

In the first days of the insurrection there were bombings by the Republican air force and the Jaime I.

On August 5, the Convoy de la Victoria departed from Ceuta, the gunboat Eduardo Dato, the old torpedo boat T-19, the coast guard cutter Uad Kert, the tugs Benot and Arango and the ships Ciudad de Ceuta and Ciudad de Algeciras were crossing the strait carrying troops; halfway across the strait the Republican destroyer Alcalá Galiano appeared and attacked the convoy, the Eduardo Dato fired on it and soon planes belonging to the rebel troops appeared and caused the Alcalá Galiano to flee; the convoy arrived at 8 in the evening at the port of Algeciras.

Two days later the battleship Jaime I, the destroyer Almirante Ferrándiz and the cruisers Libertad and Miguel de Cervantes opened fire against the Eduardo Dato docked in the port, causing a fire in the port; later they opened fire against the city, destroying the entire waterfront and forcing the population to flee to the nearby mountains.

Once the first troops disembarked in the city, the region of Campo de Gibraltar soon fell before their advance; the African troops left for Madrid leaving garrisons in the city, part of them with local Falangists, which prevented any kind of local defense. In the following months the rest of the North African troops would disembark in Algeciras and join the insurgent army.

After the war the repression in the city was as hard as in other Spanish cities, Algeciras, like the rest of the region was an area with a predominantly leftist population, in this way in the elections of 1933 the Popular Front had obtained in the city 84.5% of the votes, in the same way Algeciras had a great number of Masonic lodges.

Due to all this and the prompt adherence to the uprising against the government of the Republic by the military in the area during the war and the early years of dictatorship there were numerous arrests and shootings in the city and no armed confrontation; In this way it is known that in the old barracks of riflemen, in the Casino Cinema and in the building behind the Church of La Palma, where the bar La Oropéndola was, dissidents were imprisoned and tortured to be shot next to the cemetery in the area still known today as Punta Paredones. Numerous road and military infrastructures were built by political prisoners during the first decade, such as the old road of Los Barrios or the screens that protected the roads to the barracks of Arroyo del Lobo, which were built by prisoners sentenced to forced labor.

The activity of the maquis in the mountains of Algeciras is confirmed in the first two decades of the dictatorship, the survival of these anti-Francoist groups was maintained until well into the sixties, especially in the interior of the region, near the towns of Castellar and Jimena.

=== From mid-20th century to the present ===
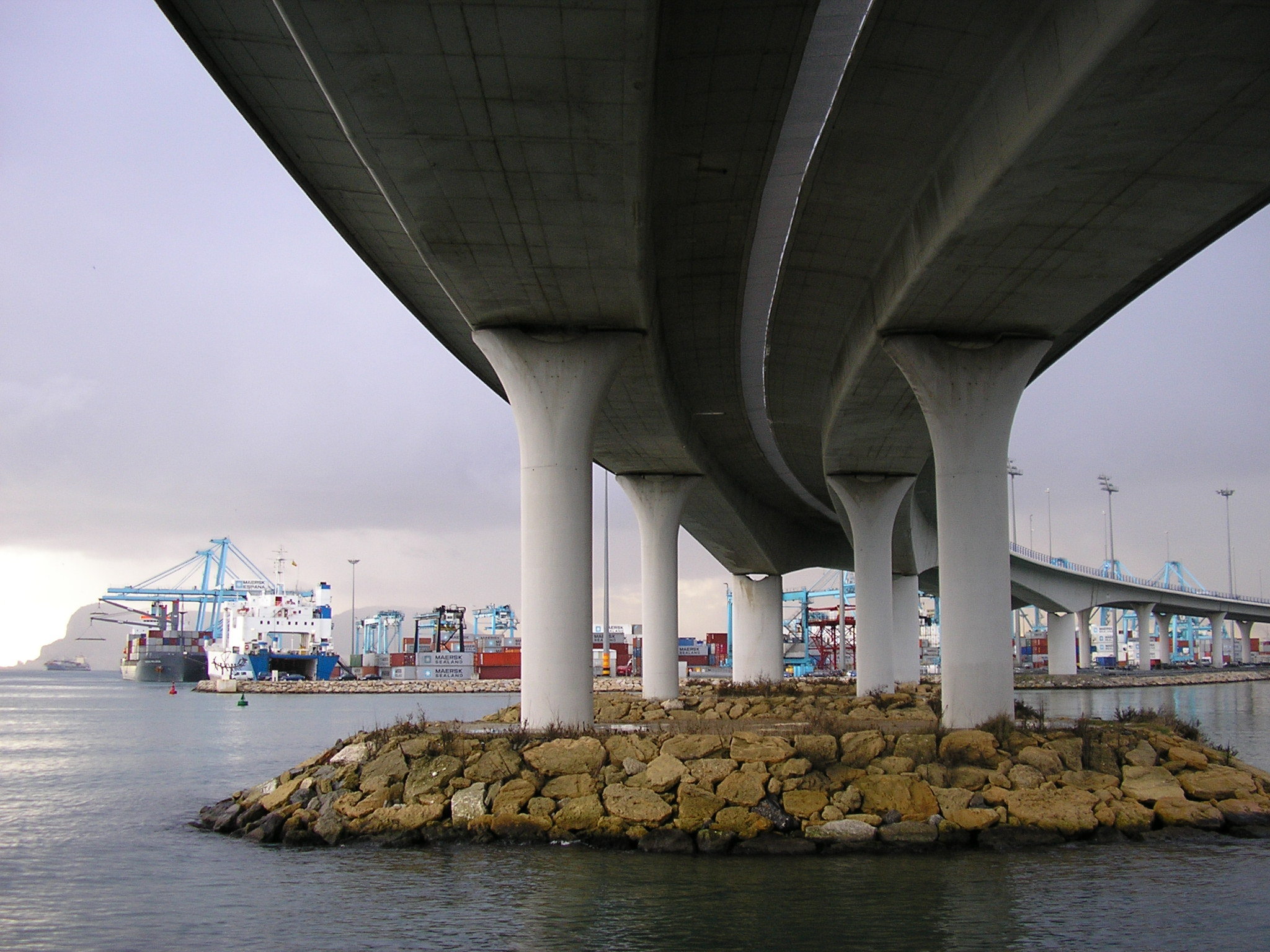
The Almanzor Bridge, inaugurated in 2000, is the northern access bridge to the port of Algeciras. It starts at La Concha beach and ends at the Juan Carlos I pier. This work avoids the passage of large container trucks through the center of the city to join the Mediterranean highway.

The first years of the dictatorship in the city were similar to those of the rest of Spain, although the numerous barracks in the city and the consequent presence of the military meant that local life was greatly influenced by them and by the city's small bourgeoisie, who soon saw how they were granted a large number of privileges.

As a consequence of the closure of the Gibraltar Gate, in 1969 the Development Plan for the Campo de Gibraltar was carried out, which provided the region and the city of Algeciras with an important industrial complex. This was the era of the Spanish economic miracle (1959-1973). This, together with the unstoppable development of the port, has given the city an enormous growth, which is evidenced by the large number of residents of the city, about 110,000 registered, but close to 150,000 residents in fact.

The port of Algeciras is, every year, the venue for Operation Crossing the Strait, in which thousands of North African citizens living in Europe take a ship bound for Ceuta or Tangier to spend their vacations in their country. Since its creation in 1906, the port of Algeciras has grown to the point of converting practically the entire coastline of the urban area into a macro-port which, due to its geographical location, is an obligatory stop for cargo ships that are preparing to cross the Atlantic or that come from the West and are going to enter the Mediterranean Sea. More than a hundred ships (many of them oil tankers) cross daily from east to west, and vice versa, the Strait of Gibraltar, which separates Algeciras from the North of Morocco. In turn, and mainly during the summer, the ferries that link Algeciras with the African shore do not cease to rotate transporting, mainly, North Africans working in Europe, foreign tourists from the neighboring Costa del Sol who want to know another culture and adventurers who enter from Tangier in the Black Continent. Due to its peculiar border situation, Algeciras has been an illegal point of entry of people and goods from Morocco. However, strict police controls have led traffickers to look for alternative routes.

Algeciras is the administrative and financial capital of the Region of Campo de Gibraltar, headquarters of the Commonwealth of Municipalities of Campo de Gibraltar; it has a subdelegate of the government of the Junta de Andalucía and a coordinator of the General Administration of the State.

== Bibliography ==
- I Congreso Internacional Fortificaciones en Al-Andalus (Actas) (in Spanish). Algeciras: Fundación Municipal de Cultura José Luis Cano. 1996.
- "Almoraima". Instituto de Estudios Campogibraltareños (in Spanish).
- "Caetaria". Fundación Municipal de Cultura José Luis Cano (in Spanish) (5).
- Delgado Gómez, Cristóbal (1971). Algeciras, pasado y presente de la ciudad de la bella bahía (in Spanish). Algeciras: Gráficasal. ISBN 978-84-400-2196-0.
- Delgado Gómez, Cristóbal (1989). Cosas de Algeciras (in Spanish). Algeciras: Librería El Libro Técnico. ISBN 84-404-5981-5.
- Delgado Gómez, Cristóbal (2003). Algeciras en Blanco y Negro (in Spanish). Fundación Municipal de Cultura José Luis Cano. ISBN 84-605-1829-9.
- El paleolítico superior final del Río Palmones (Algeciras, Cádiz) (in Spanish). Instituto de Estudios Campogibraltareños. 2001.
- García Jiménez, Guillermo (1980). Estampas algecireñas (in Spanish). Algeciras: Tipografía algecireña y Celupal. ISBN 84-300-2575-8.
- García Jiménez, Guillermo (1989). Capricho árabe (in Spanish). Algeciras: Alba S.A. ISBN 84-86209-22-6.
- Historia de Algeciras (in Spanish). Vol. 3. Diputación de Cádiz. 2001. ISBN 84-95388-34-0.
- Moreno Ortega, Fernando; Viñas González, Manuel (1995). Algeciras, ayer y hoy (in Spanish). Imprenta Grafisur.
- Pardo González, Juan Carlos (1995). La fortaleza inexistente (in Spanish). Instituto de Estudios Campogibraltareños. ISBN 84-88556-09-8.
- Requena, Fermín (1956). Muhammad y Al-Qasim "Emires de Algeciras" (in Spanish). Tipografía San Nicolás de Bari.
- Santacana y Mensayas, Emilio (1994) [1901]. Antiguo y moderno Algeciras (in Spanish). Algeciras: Tipografía El Porvenir. ISBN 84-88556-21-7.
- Torremocha Silva, Antonio (1993). Algeciras, entre la cristiandad y el islam (in Spanish). Instituto de Estudios Campogibraltareños. ISBN 84-88556-07-1.
- Torremocha Silva, Antonio (1999). Al-Binya, la ciudad palatina Meriní de Algeciras (in Spanish). Algecira: Fundación municipal de cultura Jose Luis Cano. ISBN 978-84-89227-20-0.
- Valenzuela Tello, Jose M. (1993). El afloramiento paleontológico de Los Pastores (in Spanish). Instituto de Estudios Campogibraltareños. ISBN 84-88556-01-2.
- Vidal Delgado, Rafael (2000). El fuerte de Santiago y la batalla de Algeciras (in Spanish). R.A.C.T.A. n.º 5.
