= Roman kilns of El Rinconcillo =

Coordinates: 36.1579°N 5.4481°W

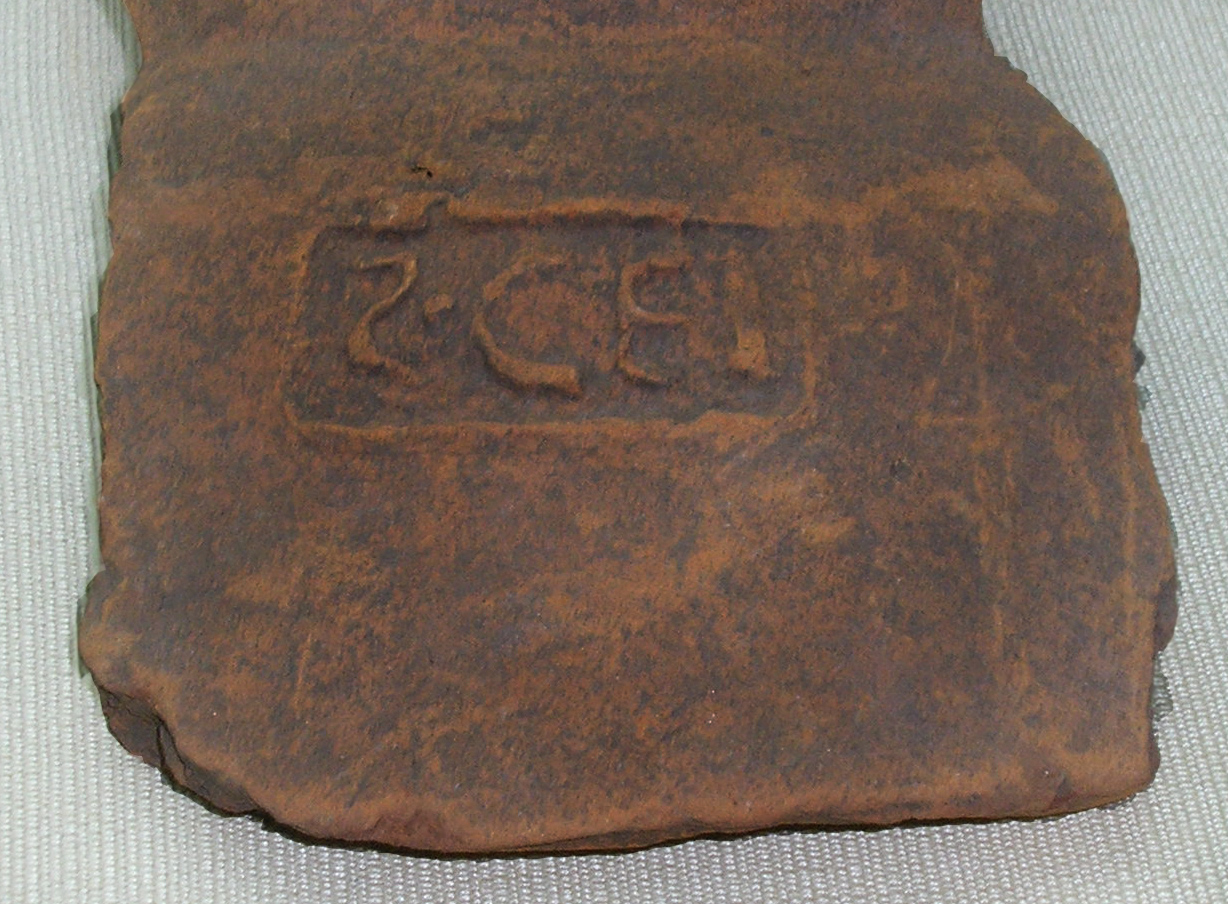
Unearthed at the site

The Roman kilns of El Rinconcillo (Spanish: Hornos romanos de El Rinconcillo) were Roman kilns located in the Spanish city of Algeciras. They were part of manufacturing complex of Portus Albus, which supplied container for transport to the processing industry of the neighboring city of Iulia Traducta, besides making other ceramic household products and items.

The kilns were discovered in 1966 by archaeologist Manuel Sotomayor, just 300 meters from the Playa de El Rinconcillo. The archaeological site consists of two furnaces attached together to form a single unit. The walls are made of ceramic and mud bricks, and the central vaults are supported by a central column and eight arches lining the walls with adobe structures including narrow holes to allow air to circulate. A site of archaeological and historical interest, it was declared a Bien de Interés Cultural site in 1969.
