= Playa de Getares =

Beach in Spain

- Beach
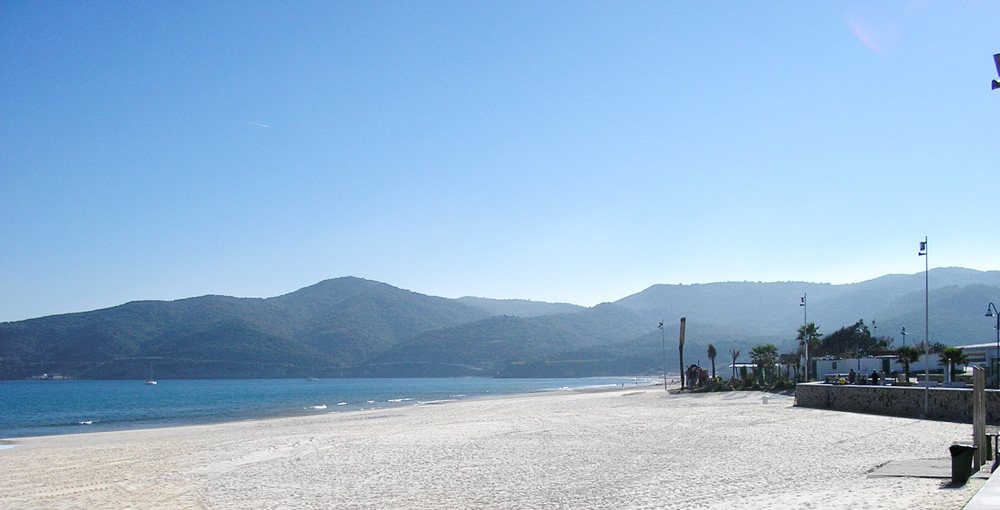
- Interactive map of Playa de Getares
- Coordinates: 36°05′42″N 5°26′33″W
- Location: Algeciras

Dimensions
  - Length: 1,500 metres (4,900 ft)(approx.)

Playa de Getares is a beach in the municipality of Algeciras, southeastern Spain. It overlooks the Bay of Gibraltar about 5 kilometres (3.1 mi) south of the city of Algeciras, between Punta San García and Punta Carnero, where the cliffs begin on the Strait of Gibraltar. It is approximately 1.5 kilometres (0.93 mi) in length and 40 metres (130 ft) wide on average.

The name comes from a Roman fish salting factory which was located in the old Roman town in the vicinity of Caetaria, and was called Cetares, and then Xetares during the Middle Ages, named in the chronicles of Alfonso XI. The whole beach is surrounded by terraced housing developments and has a promenade with bars and restaurants.
