= Fuerte de Isla Verde =

Coordinates: 36.123247°N 5.434642°W

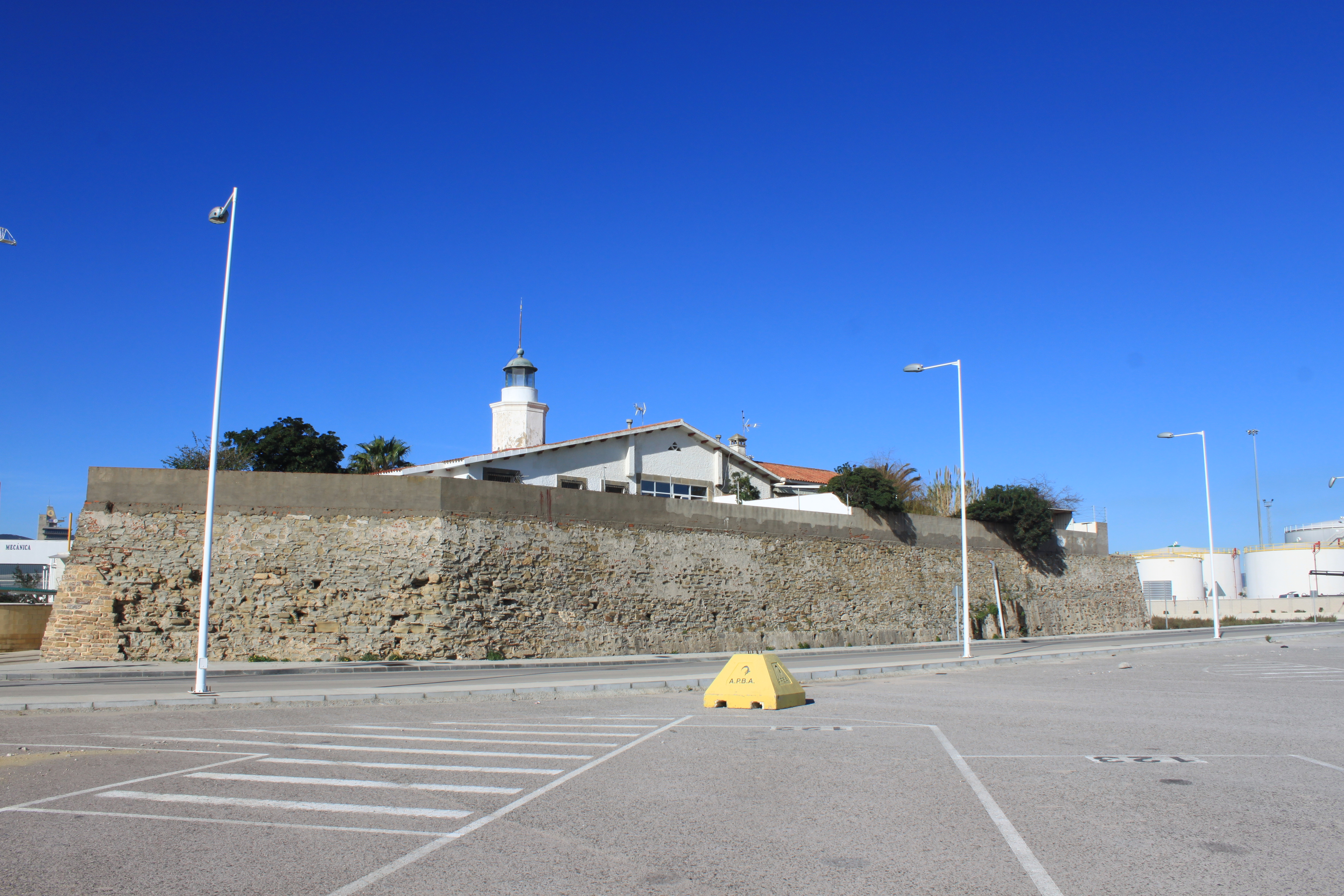
Main battery and the Isla Verde lighthouse from the East in 2013.

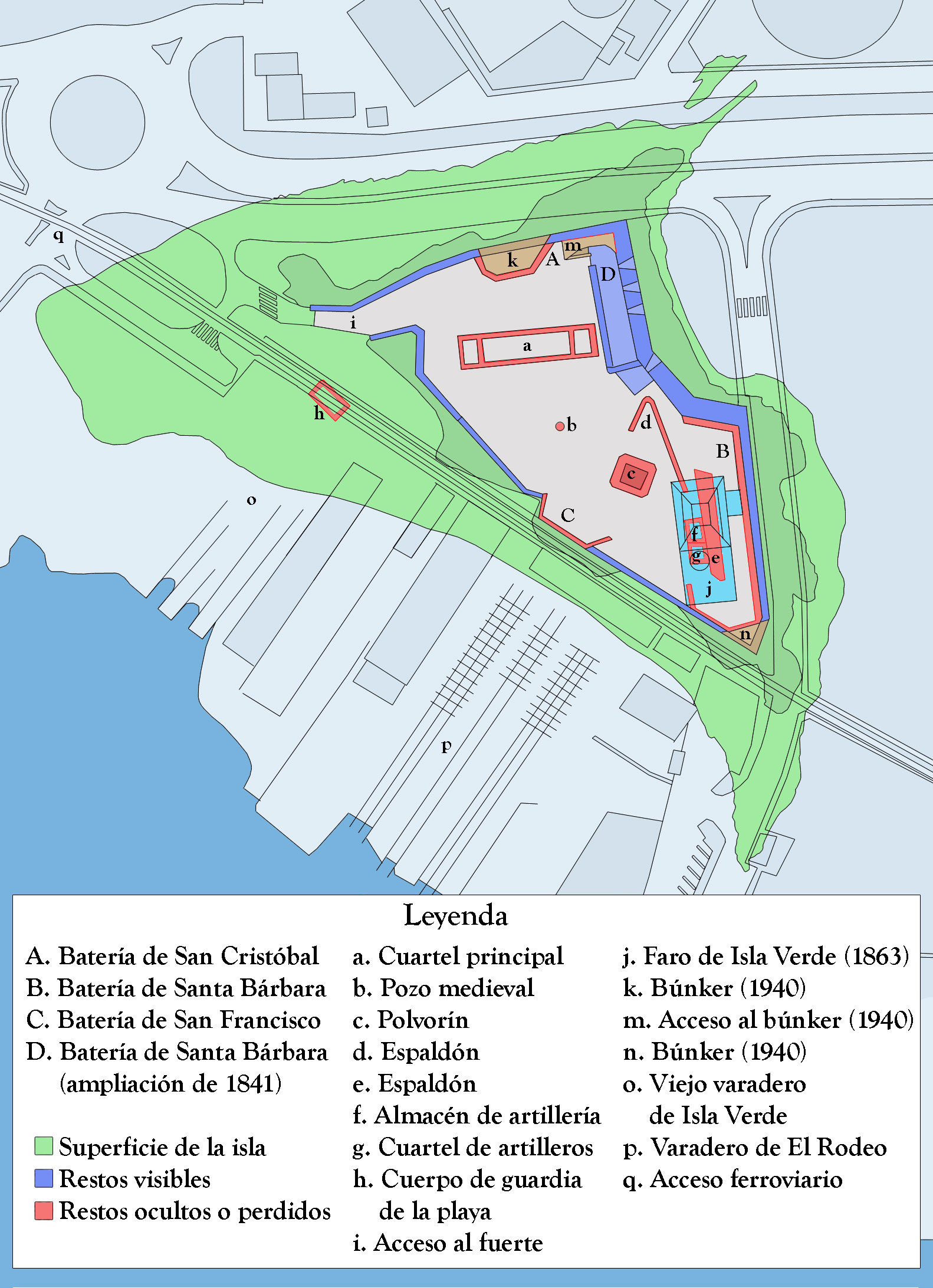
Map of Fuerte de Isla Verde prior to the remodeling of 1745

Fuerte de Isla Verde (English: Green Island Fort) was a military installation formerly located in Algeciras, Spain. It occupied the Isla Verde (English: Green Island), which gave its name to the city as a whole (via the Arabic name Al-Jazira Al-Khadra', English: Green Island, corrupted into "Algeciras"). The elongated island, which stood a short distance offshore of the city's old town, was already the site of an artillery battery in 1720. In 1734 the fort was constructed on the island to the plans of the military engineer Juan de Subreville. Further remodeling took place in 1745 under Lorenzo de Solís. The installation, which followed the roughly triangular shape of the island, was initially equipped with three batteries. These were:

- The Algeciras Battery (known from 1745 as the San Cristobal Battery, English: St. Christopher's Battery), situated on the eastern side of the island. It faced northwards and controlled the maritime access routes to the New Town of Algeciras. It was about 20 metres (66 ft) wide and could accommodate four or five guns.
- The Main Battery (Santa Barbara Battery, English: St. Barbara's Battery, from 1745), facing southeasterly towards the entrance of the Bay of Gibraltar. Its arc of fire overlapped with that of the Fuerte de San García, another fortress in Algeciras. It was about 40 metres (130 ft) wide and could accommodate thirteen heavy cannon.
- The San García Battery (the San Francisco Battery, English: St. Francis' Battery, from 1745), on the western side of the island, facing southwest. Its arc of fire overlapped with a shore battery at Punta Rodeo. This was the smallest of the fort's three batteries, measuring only 9 metres (30 ft) wide with room for two guns.

The island was ringed by a masonry wall to block access to invaders. Several buildings occupied the interior of the fort. Up to 70 men could be accommodated in the living quarters, located next to the Algeciras Battery, which were divided into separate spaces for the officers and rank-and-file. A grocery storeroom was also located there. The gunners were quartered in a barracks next to the San García Battery, alongside the artillery store where gun carriages and spare gear was stored. The building was protected by a large shoulder to protect it from enemy fire. In the centre of the island was the main magazine, constructed with thick walls to reduce the risk that a projectile hitting the building would detonate the shells and ammunition stored inside. Drinking water was drawn from a well constructed nearby. There was only one entrance to the fort, in the northwest quadrant of the island adjoining the beach. This was the most vulnerable point of the structure so it was reinforced by external obstacles located on the beach. It was also reconfigured several times during the fort's existence to strengthen it.

In 1810 most of Spanish fortifications around the Bay of Gibraltar were demolished by the British in 1810, during the Peninsular War, to stop them falling into French hands. However, the fort at Isla Verde was not affected and underwent remodelling and reinforcement on several occasions during the 19th century. By 1821 the number of batteries had been increased to five. A number of firing positions were added to facilitate the use of muskets from the fortress walls and the batteries were paved with flagstones to make it easier to move the gun carriages around. But, during the course of the century the fort gradually fell into ruin. Deficiencies in its construction and erosion caused by the sea caused the structure to deteriorate, and in 1863 the Faro de Isla Verde (English: Green Island Lighthouse) was built on top of the old San García Battery.

Improvements in artillery technology meant that by the start of the 20th century the fort had lost its previous military importance. In 1919 its management passed into the hands of the newly created Board of Harbour Works, which had to bear the cost of relocating the munitions stored there to a new magazine – which it also had to pay for – at Punta de San García. A breakwater was constructed to the north of the island to provide shelter for the construction of the docks of the Port of Algeciras. Military use continued for a while; the fort was reoccupied during the Second World War when two bunkers with machine-gun posts were constructed and manned by a detachment of 40 soldiers, for whom a barracks and kitchen were built. The fort was partly destroyed in the 1960s when an expansion of the port resulted in warehouses and factories being built on the site.

The fort was given protected status as an historical heritage site in 1985 and was awarded special recognition in 1993 by the Government of Andalusia. In 2006, the Port Authority of Algeciras sponsored work to excavate and restore the surviving parts of the fort. The remains of the structure were partly reconstructed in an attempt to restore it to a semblance of its original appearance.
