= Canton of Algeciras =

Canton of Algeciras Cantón de Algeciras
- Canton of First Spanish Republic
- 1873
- Flag

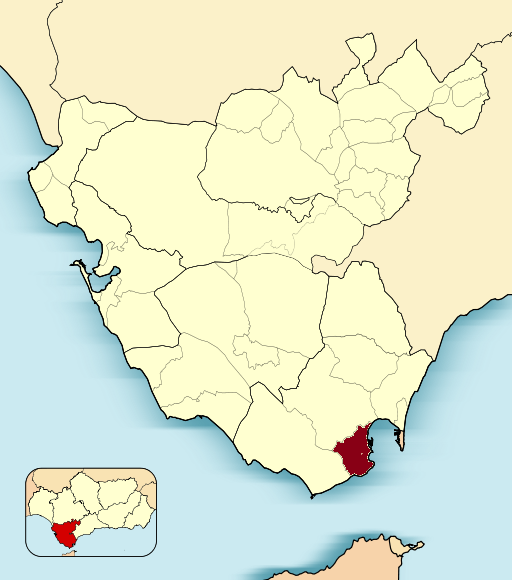
- Algeciras within the Province of Cádiz
- Capital: Algeciras
  - Type: Commune (Junta)
- Historical era: Sexenio Democrático
  - Cantonal rebellion begins: 12 July 1873
  - Established: 22 July 1873
  - Disestablished: 8 August 1873
  - Cantonal rebellion ends: 12 January 1874
Preceded by	Succeeded by
First Spanish Republic	First Spanish Republic

The Canton of Algeciras was a national entity that was part of the revolutionary movement in of Algeciras during the First Spanish Republic, known as the cantonalist movement.

== History ==
After the proclamation of the canton of Cádiz on 19 July 1873 and the subsequent adhesion to this of a large number of municipalities on 22 July, the Committee for Public Safety formed by federalist republicans was formed in Algeciras, which dismissed the city council. The proclamation of the independent canton of Algeciras was accepted by the mayor of the city, Francisco Guerrero, in an extraordinary session; the next day a statement was sent to Fermín Salvoechea and other cantonal leaders by Eleuterio Torrelo, who likely belonged to the Federal Republican Committee. The lack of municipal acts during the days that the canton was in force indicates that except for this first act of resignation of the municipal body, no sessions were held by the Committee for Public Safety in the city. Among the measures adopted by the Committee for Public Safety after the dissolution of the city council, the unblocking of tobacco, the suppression of the Lottery, neighborhood bank notes and pensions as well as the collection of contributions.

Contrary to other cities in the southwest of Andalusia, Algeciras did not show its adherence to the canton of Cádiz but maintained its independence and organized itself autonomously. In this sense, a group of citizens marched in the first days after the proclamation towards the neighboring city of Los Barrios and intended to destroy the bridge that separated both municipalities when they learnt that this city had joined the Cadiz canton. A few days later, a representation from the Committee for Public Safety left for the neighboring city of Ceuta to request weapons from the military governor of the city. Given this refusal, it was decided in Algeciras to blockade the North African city, preventing the departure of ships from the port to the neighboring city.

Military support for the revolutionary movement in Algeciras was nil during the time it lasted as the military governor of Campo de Gibraltar, General Letendre, did not intervene on either side. Not even when Cádiz fell on 4 August and the volunteers from Algeciras tried to seize the weapons did the Algeciras police force take part in the incidents. The carabinieri troops were quartered in the San García fort until the Committee for Public Safety was dissolved on 8 August, when it was learned in the city that General Pavía's troops were near Algeciras. After that, several members of the cantonal city council took refuge in Gibraltar, while others were arrested and later amnestied. On the same day, 8 August, the city council was restored with the same councilors who were part of it on 22 July.

== Bibliography ==
- Villatoro Nobre, Antonio Jesús (1988). "Algeciras y el movimiento cantonalista" (PDF). Almoraima, revista de estudios campogibraltareños (in Spanish). Archived from the original (PDF) on 12 December 2009.
- del Castillo, Luis Alberto (1988). "El cantón de Algeciras en las actas municipales" (PDF). Almoraima, revista de estudios campogibraltareños (in Spanish). Archived from the original (PDF) on 12 December 2009.
- Santacana y Mensayas, Emilio (1901). Antiguo y moderno Algeciras (in Spanish). Establecimiento tipográfico El Porvenir. ISBN 84-88556-20-9.
