= Playa de Los Ladrillos =

Former beach in Spain

Coordinates: 36°08′25″N 5°26′48″W

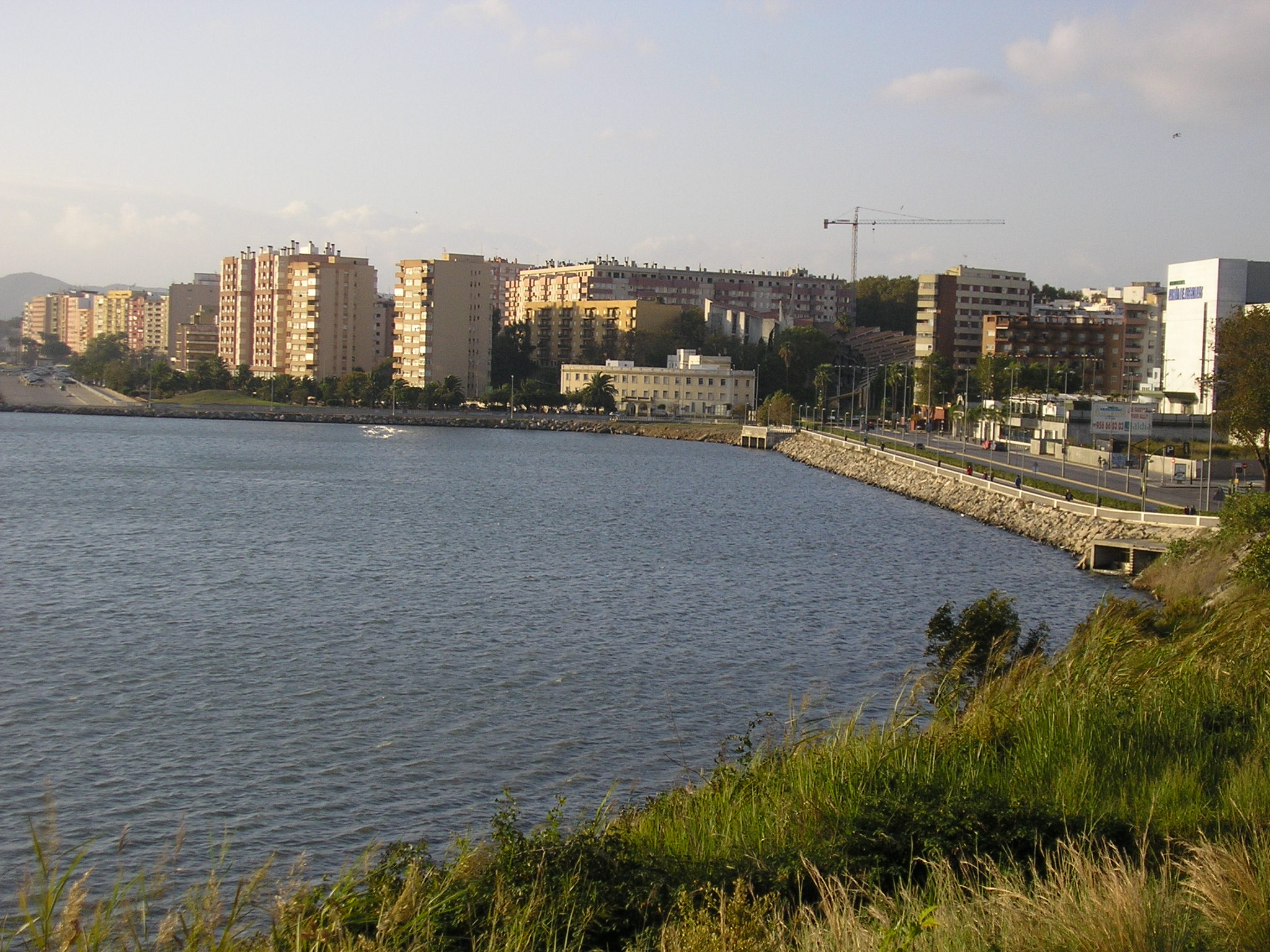

Playa de Los Ladrillos was a beach in the municipality of Algeciras, southeastern Spain. It overlooked the Bay of Algeciras, next to Playa del Barranco. It was about 200 metres in length. It disappeared with the growth of the Port of Algeciras.
