= Fort of El Tolmo =

- Fuerte de El Tolmo (Spanish)
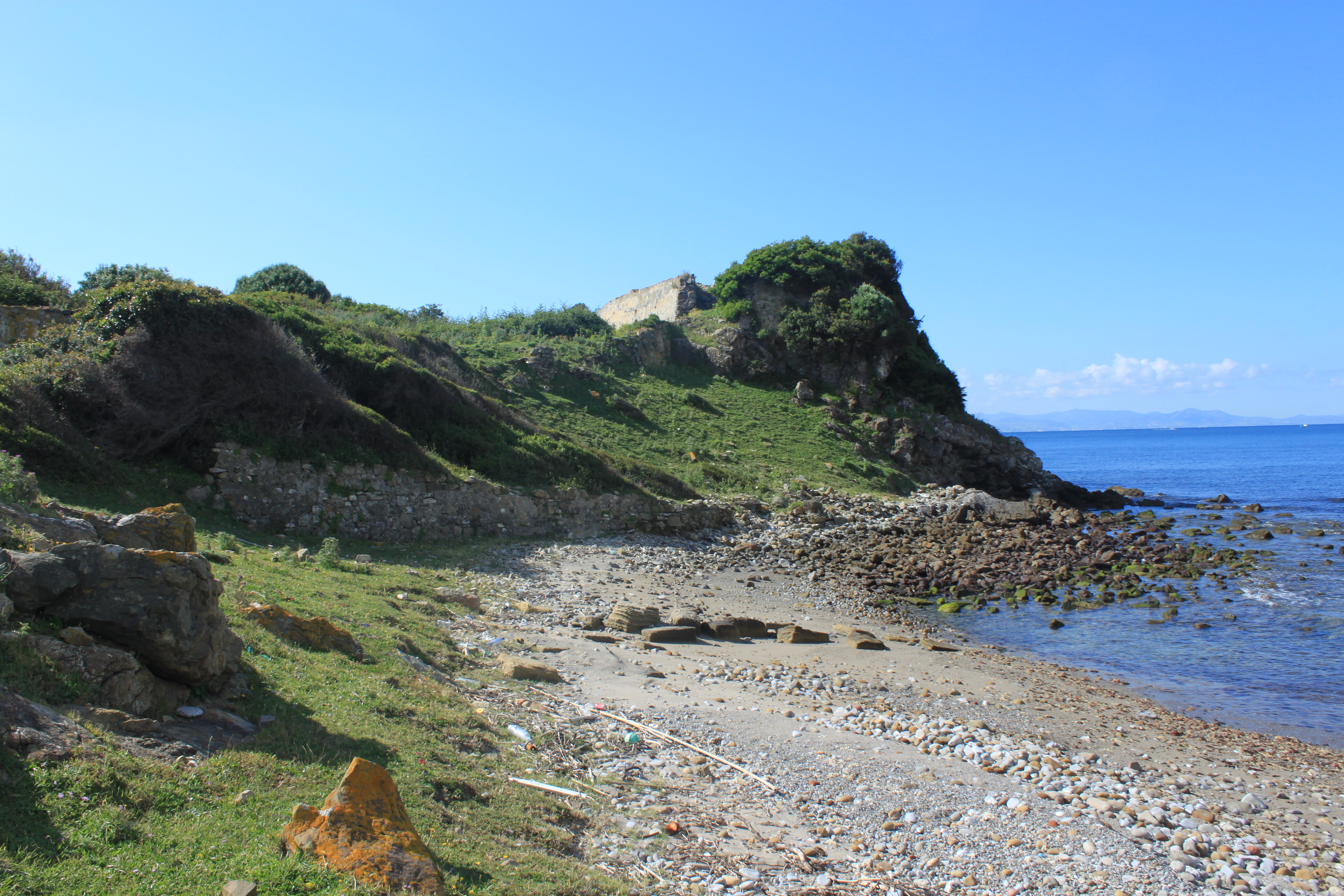

- Location within Spain
- 36.053680°N 5.482762°W
- Location: Algeciras, Spain

Spanish Cultural Heritage
- Official name: Fuerte de El Tolmo
- Type: Non-movable
- Criteria: Monument
- Designated: 1985
- Reference no.: RI-51-0012210

The Fort de El Tolmo (Spanish: Fuerte de El Tolmo) was a fort located in Algeciras, Spain. It was declared Bien de Interés Cultural in 1985. Only large ruins remain.
