= Río de la Miel =

River of Honey
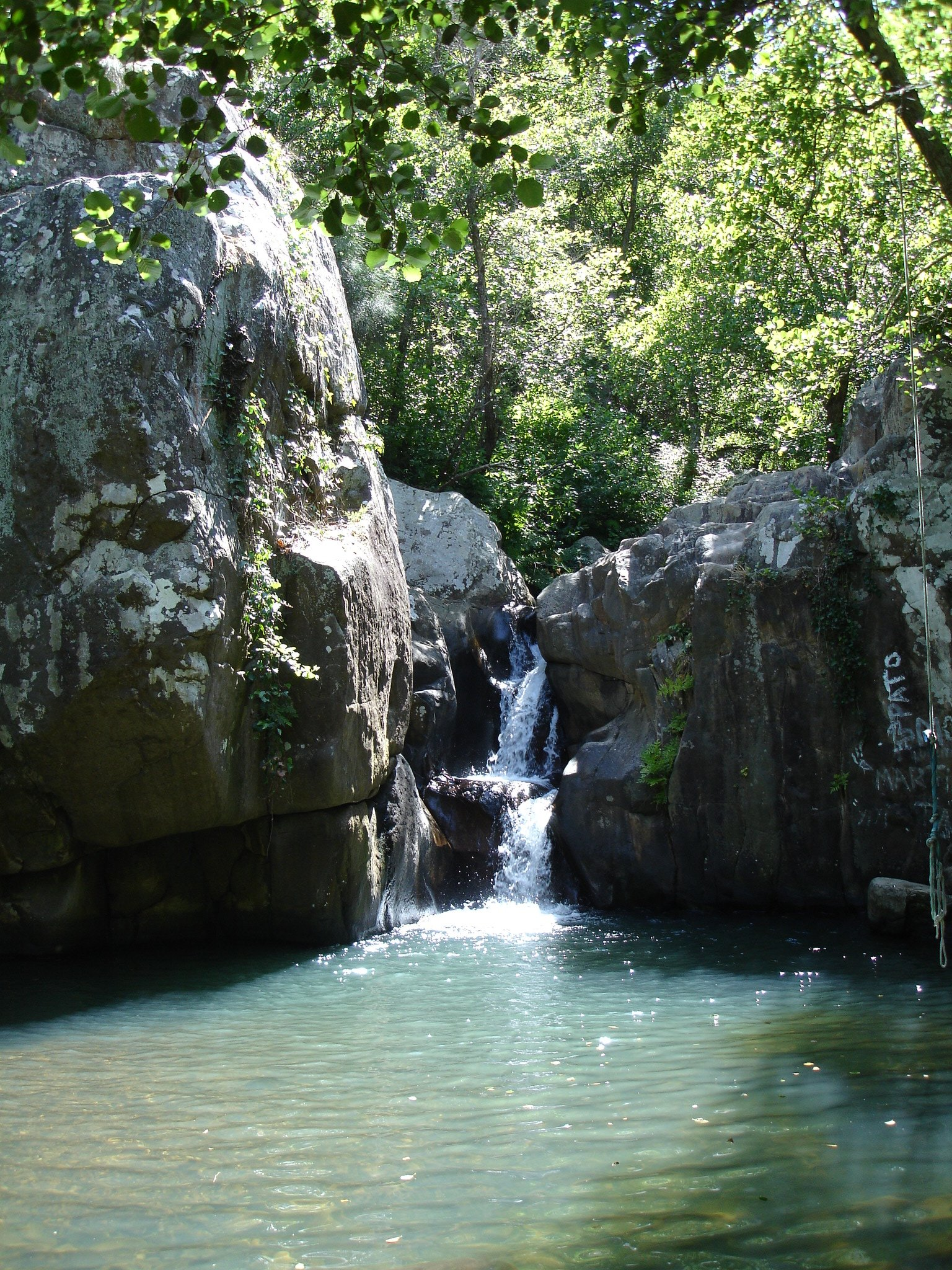
- Río de la Miel.

- Location within Algeciras
- Native name: Río de la Miel (Spanish)

Location
- Country: Spain
- Autonomous Region: Andalusia

Physical characteristics
- Source
  - location: Sierra del Bujeo
- Mouth
  - location: port of Algeciras, Algeciras, Spain.
  - coordinates: 36.1158°N 5.4878°W
- Length: 9 kilometres (5.6 mi)

The Río de la Miel is a short river in the south of Spain, emptying into the Bay of Gibraltar at Algeciras. It falls over a distance of 350 metres including some waterfalls and working water mills. As the port of Algeciras expanded, docks on the river became marooned inland, and within the town much of the river is now culverted.

The literal translation of the name is the honey river.
