= Playa de El Rinconcillo =

Beach in Andalusia, Spain

- Beach
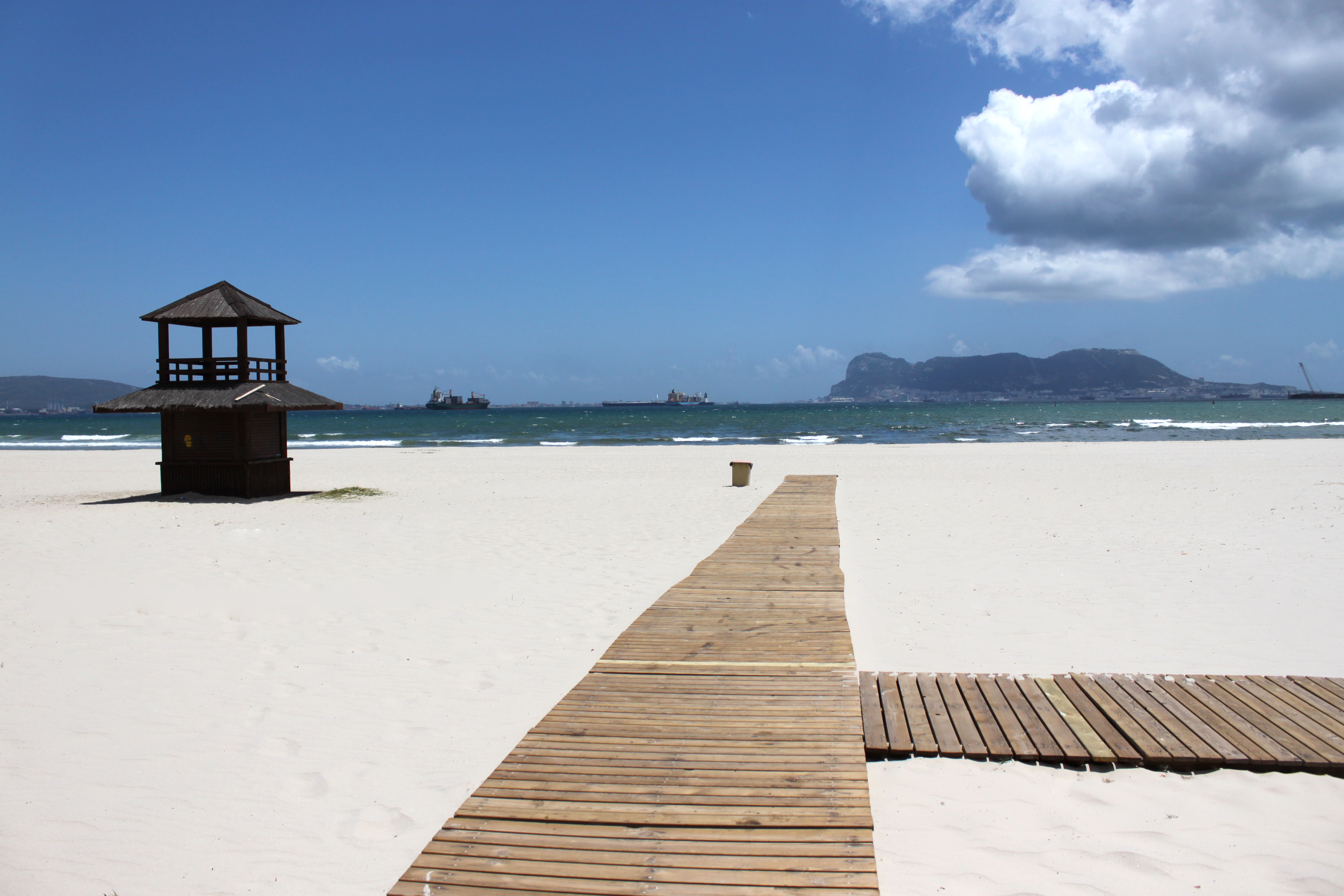
- Interactive map of Playa de El Rinconcillo
- Coordinates: 36°09′28″N 5°26′28″W
- Location: Algeciras

Dimensions
  - Length: 2,550 metres (8,370 ft)(approx.)

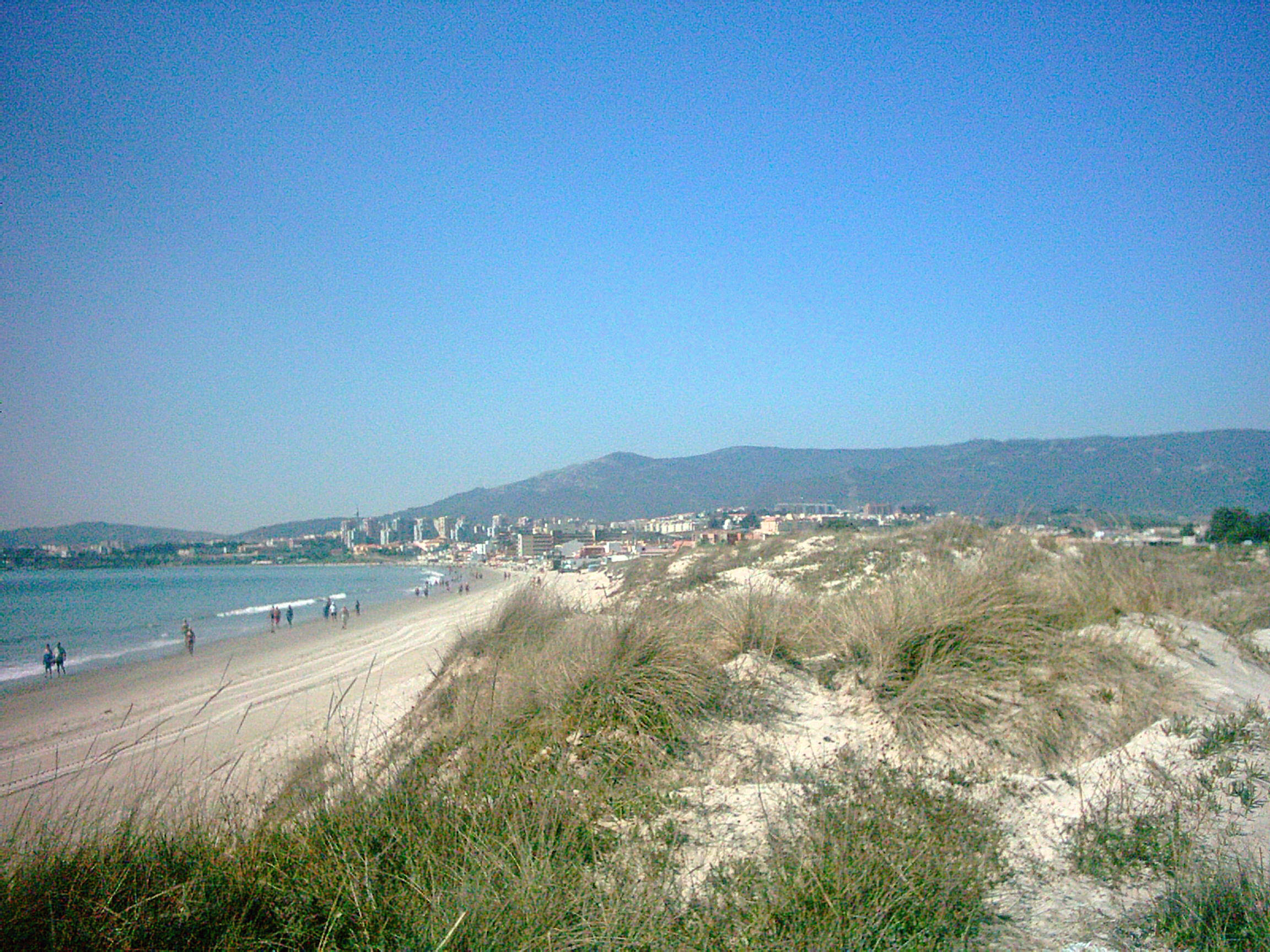

Playa de El Rinconcillo is a beach in the Province of Cadiz, Andalusia, Spain, located to the north of the city of Algeciras, near the neighborhood of El Rinconcillo. It looks across to the rock of Gibraltar and La Línea de la Concepción.

It extends from the Puente de Acceso Norte access to the mouth of the Rio Palmones, a total length of 2550 metres and an average width of 40 metres including Rinconcillo beach itself and a small cove called La Concha. The beach has two distinct areas, the first is southern part of the beach, surrounded by the suburb of El Rinconcillo and several bars and restaurants, and is characterized by shallow water, making it ideal for swimming. The second area, which is completely undeveloped, is nearest to the river mouth. It is surrounded by the river marshes and the Palmones dunes. This area is steeper and has deeper water than in the first section of the beach. The estuary here attracts numerous birds.
