= Battle of Algeciras =

The Battle of Algeciras or Siege of Algeciras may refer to:

- Siege of Algeciras (1278)
- Battle of Algeciras (1278)
- Siege of Algeciras (1309)
- Siege of Algeciras (1342-1344)
- Siege of Algeciras (1369)
- Battle of Algeciras (1801) or the Algeciras Campaign
  - First Battle of Algeciras
  - Second Battle of Algeciras
