= Venta de Pantalones =

- Village
- Location in Spain Venta de Pantalones (Spain)
- Coordinates: 37°38′25″N 4°03′37″W
- Country: Spain
- Autonomous community: Andalusia
- Province: Jaén
- Municipality: Martos
- Elevation: 490 m (1,610 ft)
- Time zone: UTC+1 (CET)
  - Summer (DST): UTC+2 (CEST)
- Postal code: 23669

Venta de Pantalones is a village belonging to the municipality of Martos, in the province of Jaén (Andalusia, Spain). It is located about 14.5 kilometres (9.0 mi) from Martos, and about 6 kilometres (3.7 mi) north of Alcaudete, next to the Víboras river.

== Transport ==
Prior to the construction of the A-316 Andalusian regional road, Venta de Pantalones on was the main road connecting Martos with Alcaudete, and therefore, Jaén with Alcaudete and the southern area of the province. Today this road has been relegated to the background, and the village receives much less traffic. The village is located two kilometers by road from the Vía Verde del Aceite, included in the National Network of Natural Trails.
