= Order of Saint Mary of Spain =

Emblem of the Order.

The Order of Saint Mary of Spain (Spanish: Orden de Santa María de España), also known as the Order of the Star, was a Spanish military order concentrating in naval activity created by Alfonso X of Castile, King of León and Castile in 1270.

== History ==
=== Origins ===
The order was founded around the year 1270 by King Alfonso X of Castile with the purpose of aiding the naval defenses of the Crown of Castile. It was founded similarly to the Order of Calatrava and its members were made up of nobles, knights and clergy.

Since 1273 it was integrated by order of the king with the Cistercians and its uniform was a black robe and a red cape with a gold star, inside of which was embroidered the arms of the Crown.

The Códice de Florencia of the Cantigas de Santa Maria has a cantiga dedicated to this order. Unfortunately, of the four books of cantigas preserved, that of Florence is the only one with lines of empty staves, so the music of this ballad was not conserved.

=== Headquarters ===
The mother headquarters of the order were founded in Cartagena, in a Cistercian convent that was built by order of the king with the express wish that he be buried there upon his death. The order was put under the invocation of the Our Lady of Rossell, whose medieval carvings have been found in Cartagena.

A Cistercian monastery in Cartagena is mentioned as their headquarters and some historians believe that Cartagena Cathedral that headquarters.

The order also had bases in the ports of San Sebastián, La Coruña, and El Puerto de Santa María; all dependent on Cartagena.

=== Dissolution ===
On the 23rd of June, 1280, the defeat at the Battle of Moclín effectively wiped out the membership of the Order of Santiago. Castilian troops under the command of Gonzalo Ruiz Girón, Grand Master of the Order of Santiago and Sancho el Bravo (Although Sancho did not actually participate in the battle), were slaughtered by Muslim forces under the command of Muhammad II. The battle was a major disaster for the Order of Santiago which claimed the lives of many of its members, including that of Gonzalo Ruiz Girón, who died of wounds received in the battle.

In order to prevent the extinction of the Order of Santiago due to the loss of men at Moclín, King Alfonso X of Castile integrated the members of the Order of Santa María into that of Santiago and named the new Grand Master Pedro Núñez. This integration effectively ended the Order of Santa Maria.

A further reason for its disbandment and integration into the Order of Santiago was its ineffectiveness in the battle against Castile's enemies at sea. In the order's only great expedition, the armada of Santa María de España was totally annihilated at the naval Battle of Algeciras.

== Modern Reformation ==
On August 13, 2008, a Catholic religious order was formed in Cartagena which proclaimed its hereditary roots with the Order of Santa María. It also proclaimed, amongst other things, the cult of advocación mariana, which honors the Virgen del Rosell.

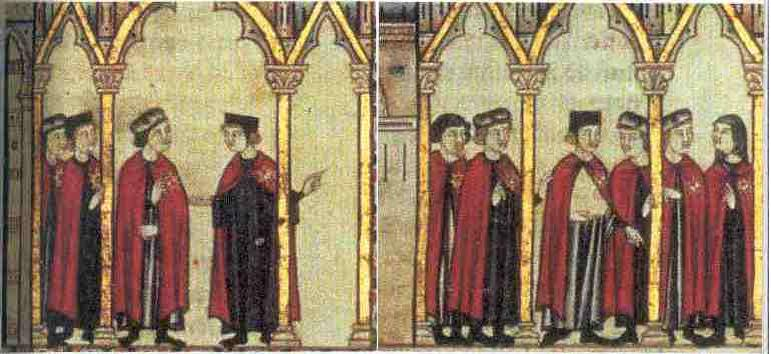
A scene from the Cantigas de Santa María.

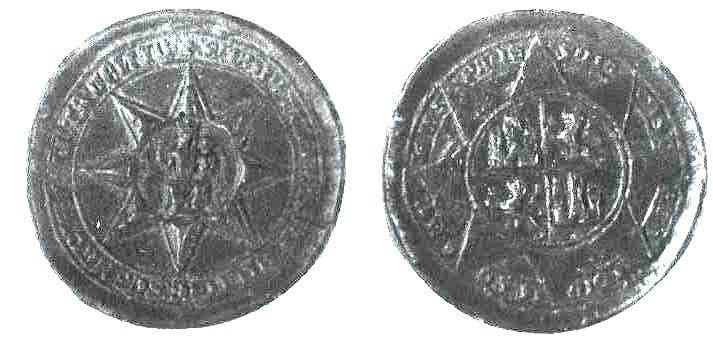
Coin from the 13th century depicting the order's Grand Master.

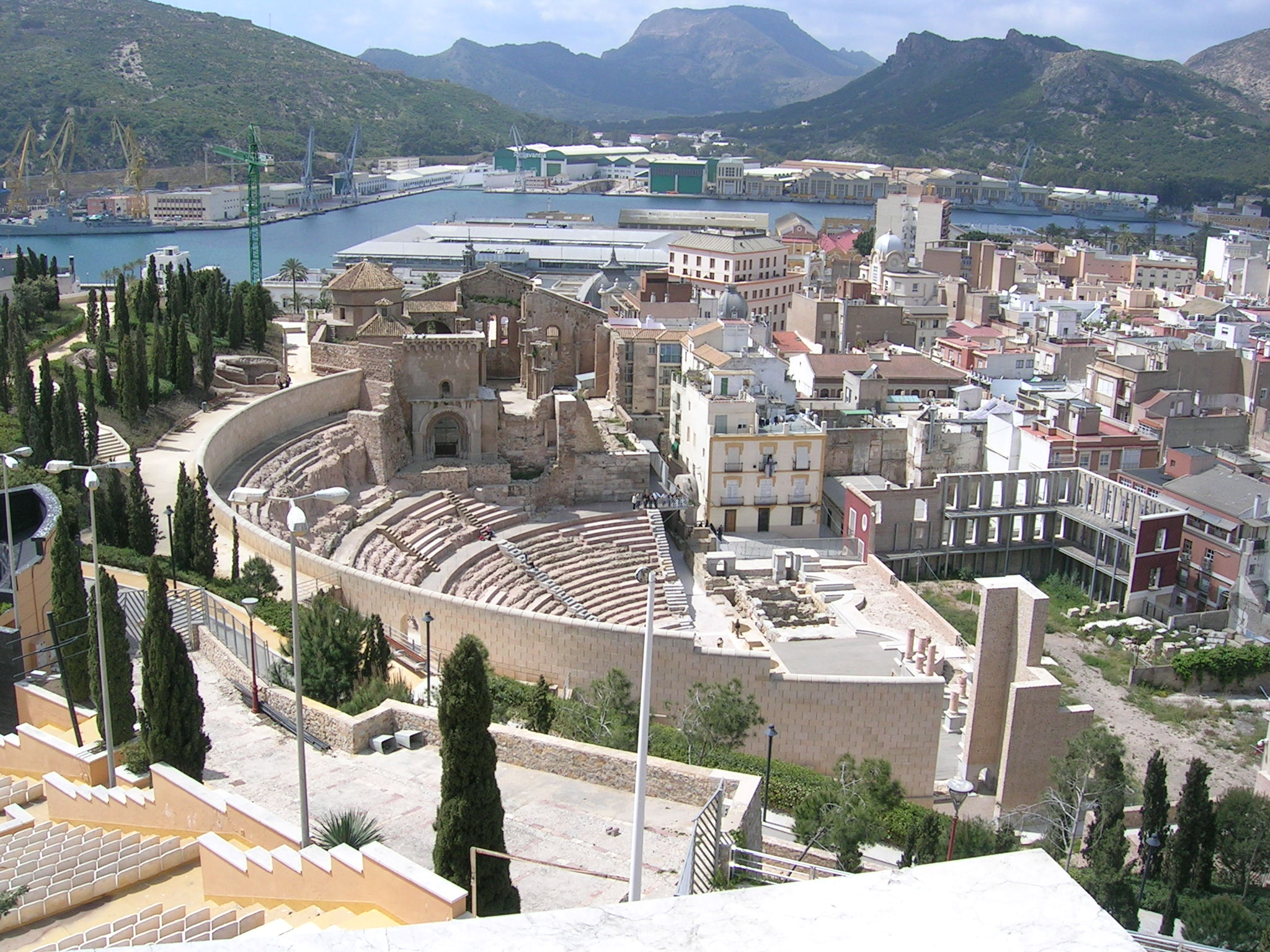
Ruins of the Cathedral of Cartagena where the order was based.

== See also ==
- Spanish military orders
- Alfonso X of Castile
- Orders, decorations, and medals of Spain
- Order of Santiago
- Reconquista

=== Bibliography ===
- García Fitz, Francisco (2005). Castilla y León frente al Islam. Estrategias de expansión y tácticas militares (siglos XI-XIII) (1ª ed.). Madrid: Universidad de Sevilla. ISBN 84-472-0421-9.
- González Jiménez, Manuel (October 2004). Alfonso X el Sabio (1ª ed.). Barcelona: Editorial Ariel. ISBN 84-344-6758-5.
- González Jiménez, Manuel (1991). "Relaciones de las Ordenes Militares castellanas con la Corona (siglos XII-XIII)". Historia, Instituciones, Documentos (18). Sevilla: Universidad de Sevilla: Departamento de Historia Medieval y Ciencias y Técnicas Historiográficas: 209–222. ISSN 0210-7716.
- Ibáñez de Segovia Peralta y Mendoza, Gaspar; Marqués de Mondéjar (1777). Joaquín Ibarra (ed.). Memorias historicas del Rei D. Alonso el Sabio i observaciones a su chronica. Madrid: en casa de D. Joachin Ibarra.
- Lafuente Alcántara, Miguel; Miguel Lafuente Alcántara (2008). Historia de Granada, comprendiendo la de sus cuatro provincias. Tomo I. Valladolid: Editorial Maxtor. ISBN 978-84-9761-505-1.
- Torres Fontes, Juan (1977). "La Orden de Santa María de España". Miscelánea medieval murciana. 3. Murcia: Universidad de Murcia: 73–118. ISSN 0210-4903. Archived from the original on 2011-09-29.
