= Battle of Moclín =

Battle of Moclín may refer to:

- Battle of Moclín (1280)
- Battle of Moclín (1808)
