= Gonzalo Ruiz Girón =

13th-century Spanish nobleman

Cross of the Order of Santiago.

Gonzalo Ruiz Girón (died 1280) was a Spanish nobleman from Palencia. He was Grand Master of the Order of Santiago, and Adelantado of the Kingdom of Murcia. Ruiz was killed at the Battle of Moclín. He was a member of the House of Girón.

== Family origins ==
He was the son of Gonzalo González Girón and Teresa Arias. His paternal grandparents were Gonzalo Rodríguez Girón, a noble from Frechilla and Autillo de Campos, head mayordomo of King Alfonso VIII of Castile and his first wife Sancha Rodríguez. They are credited with founding the Hospital de la Herrada in Carrión de los Condes. His maternal grandparents were Arias González de Quesada and María Froilaz.

The family legend states that a noble named Rodrigo González de Cisneros saved the life of King Alfonso VI of León by giving the king his horse and thus allowing him to escape what was apparently a battle lost to a Moorish Kingdom. He cut three pieces (jirones or girones, in Spanish) from the King's tunic and later asked the King to allow him to use these in his coat of arms.

This legend has no foundations and the events are not mentioned by historians or in popular tradition. Most importantly, the use of coats of arms was unknown at the time of King Alfonso VI and it was not until a century later that this custom became common.

Traditionally, the House of Girón was one of the most powerful families in the area of Tierra de Campos since the time of the Banu Gómez.

== Biography ==
He entered into the Order of Santiago de la Espada and was made commander of Ocaña, León, and Castile.

In 1274, he gained ownership over the charter of Montiel and the towns of Cózar and Alcubillas. In 1275, he was elected as Grand Master of the Order of Santiago, succeeding Pelayo Pérez Correa. In that same here, Gonzalo was granted a lifelong title over areas in Montiel and was responsible for the repopulation, and the foundation of new localities.

== Death ==
In 1280, Gonzalo died as a result of injuries received during the Battle of Moclín, which was fought on the 23rd of June of that year in the municipality of Moclín in Granada. More than 2,800 men died in that battle, including a large number of the members of the Order of Santiago. He was buried in the town of Alcaudete in Jaén.

== Marriage and descendants ==
Gonzalo married Elvira Díaz de Castañeda, granddaughter of Alvar Díaz de Asturias and of Teresa Perez Girón, daughter of Diego Gómez de Castañeda. Gonzalo had at least two children with Elvira:

- Gonzalo Rodríguez Girón y Castañeda y Rodrigo González, also known as Rodrigo González de San Román or Ruy González Girón
- María Girón y Castañeda, who married Alvar Pérez de Guzmán, and was the eventual grandmother of Leonor de Guzmán and of Alonso Meléndez de Guzmán.

== Bibliography ==
- García Fitz, Francisco (2005). Universidad de Sevilla (ed.). Castilla y León frente al Islam. Estrategias de expansión y tácticas militares (siglos XI-XIII) (1st ed.). Madrid: Secretariado de Publicaciones de la Universidad de Sevilla. ISBN 84-472-0421-9.
- González Jiménez, Manuel (October 2004). Alfonso X el Sabio (1st ed.). Barcelona: Editorial Ariel S. A. ISBN 84-344-6758-5.
- González Jiménez, Manuel (1991). "Relaciones de las Ordenes Militares castellanas con la Corona (siglos XII-XIII)". Historia, Instituciones, Documentos. No. 18. Sevilla: Universidad de Sevilla: Departamento de Historia Medieval y Ciencias y Técnicas Historiográficas. pp. 209–222. ISSN 0210-7716.
- Ibáñez de Segovia Peralta y Mendoza, Gaspar; Marqués de Mondejar (1777). Joachin Ibarra (ed.). Memorias historicas del Rei D. Alonso el Sabio i observaciones a su chronica. Madrid: en casa de D. Joachin Ibarra.
- Lafuente Alcántara, Miguel (2008). Historia de Granada, comprendiendo la de sus cuatro provincias. Tomo I. Valladolid: Editorial Maxtor. ISBN 978-84-9761-505-1.
- Torres Fontes, Juan (1977). "La Orden de Santa María de España". Miscelánea medieval murciana. Vol. 3. Murcia: Universidad de Murcia. pp. 73–118. ISSN 0210-4903. Archived from the original on 29 September 2011.
- de Salazar y Acha, Jaime (1989). "Los descendientes del conde Ero Fernández, fundador de Monasterio de Santa María de Ferreira de Pallares". El Museo de Pontevedra. No. 43. pp. 67–86. ISSN 0210-7791.

== See also ==
- Order of Santiago
- Reconquista
- Alfonso IX of León
- Alfonso X of Castile
- Battle of Moclín

Preceded by Pelayo Pérez Correa	Grand Master of the Order of Santiago; 1275–1277	Succeeded by Pedro Núñez
