= Canelita =

Spanish flamenco singer

- Born: Algeciras

Jonathan Vera Granja (Spanish pronunciation: [ˈɟʝonatam ˈbeɾa ˈɣɾaŋxa]), known professionally as Canelita born in Algeciras (31 July 1989), is a Spanish flamenco singer. Coming from the barrio of La Bajadilla, in Algeciras, in the south of Spain. He was discovered by Spanish singer and guitarist Manzanita, while recording an album titled "Homenaje al Chino". Canelita stands out for having grown up and performed in some of the same places where Paco de Lucia, native of Algeciras himself, did as well. In his early years, he released songs such as Vivo Errante (2004) and Canelita por mi calle (2005). His album, Vuelvo, released in November 2010, alternates traditional flamenco singing ballads and pop tunes, seeking to reach a mass audience. Canelita is mainly noted for his fandangos and bulerías, but can also sing rumbas and tangos. Canelita is considered one of the best flamenco artista of the moment. He has released albums with great hits such as "Saltaré", "Vuelvo", "A la orilla de tu boca". His latest single, published in 2019, is called “Intentaré Olvidarte” featuring Moncho Chavea in the mix. In March 2020, he started to publish his songs with his record label, "Canelita Music S.L". Some his most successful songs have been "Báilame", "Juanito Juan" or "Ojalá Supiera".

== Personal life ==
He has been associated with Spanish footballer Sergio Ramos and they have recorded a song together, 'A quien le voy a contar mis penas, which featured on his album Soñaré.
