= Battle of Algeciras (1278) =

Naval battle of the Reconquista

- Part of the Reconquista
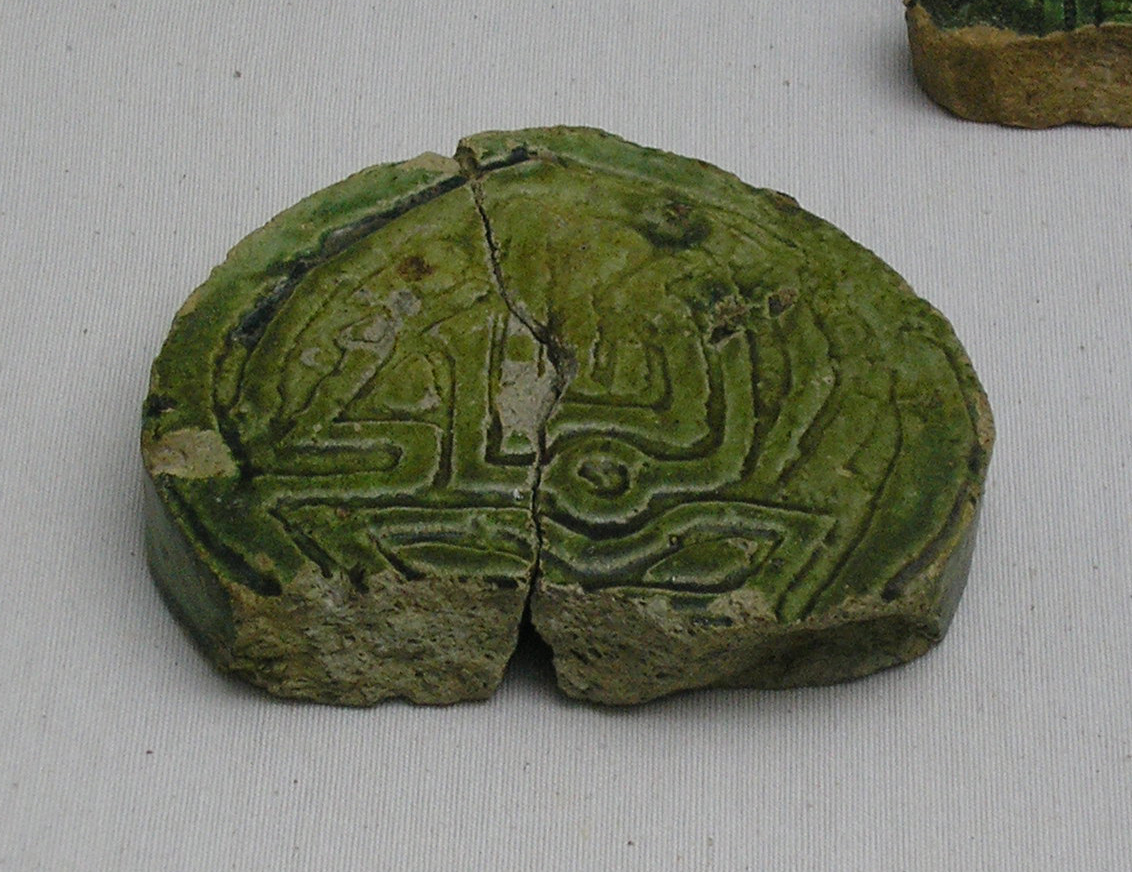
- Marinid gravestone, 13th century (Museo Municipal de Algeciras).
Date	25 July 1278
Location	Strait of Gibraltar, Emirate of Granada, Spain
Result	Marinid victory

Belligerents
Kingdom of Castile; Order of Santa María de España	Marinid Sultanate; Emirate of Granada

Commanders and leaders
Pedro Martínez de Fe	Abu Yaqub Yusuf an-Nasr

Strength
Castilian navy • 100 ships	Marinid navy • 72 ships Nasrid navy • 12 ships

Casualties and losses
All but 3 ships and hundreds drowned	Unknown

The Battle of Algeciras was a naval battle which occurred on July 25, 1278. The battle pitted the fleets of the Kingdom of Castile, commanded by the Admiral of Castile, Pedro Martínez de Fe, and the combined fleets of the Marinid dynasty and that of the Emirate of Granada, commanded by Abu Yaqub Yusuf an-Nasr. The battle was fought in the context of the Moorish naval expeditions to the Iberian Peninsula. The battle, which took place in the Strait of Gibraltar, resulted in a Muslim victory.

This battle coincided with a simultaneous siege of the city of Algeciras which lasted from 1278–79 and was commanded by the Infante Sancho. The Castilian prince would abandon the siege later in 1279, marking the end of the first action of the long battle for the Strait of Gibraltar.

== History ==
In 1275, the Marinid Sultan Abu Yusuf Yaqub ibn Abd Al-Haqq disembarked on the peninsula commanding an army with the strategic objective to occupy the city of Tarifa. Along this route, he directly participated in various actions, including the Battle of Écija.

By 1278, King Alfonso X of Castile, sent a large fleet from Sevilla with the goal of blockading that same city. The fleet, which was made up of more than 100 ships of different types, was commanded by the Order of Santa María de España, a military-religious Spanish order which was concentrated in naval warfare. The fleet was commanded by the Admiral of Castile, Pedro Martínez de Fe. The Marinid Sultan worked to gather his own fleet of 72 ships and was reinforced with a small fleet of 12 ships sent by the Sultan of Grenada, Muhammad II.

Once these two fleets were united, the Muslim fleets recognized a tactical advantage seeing that the Castilian fleet was in poor condition as many of its crew members were afflicted by an attack of scurvy. They decided to attack on the 25th of July and the action took place off the coast of Algeciras and resulted in the practical destruction of the entire Castilian fleet.

== Aftermath ==
A large portion of the responsibility for the destruction of the Castilian fleet fell on the infante Pedro who appropriated much of the fleets and the siege's tax funding and condemned it to serious supply problems. King Alfonso X however failed to punish his son and instead chose to blame the fleets failure on the Jewish tax collectors Yishaq de la Maleha, ordering his arrest, appropriating all his assets and ordering his execution.

The embarrassment following the battle led to the subsequent irrelevance of the Order of Santa María de España which was integrated with the Order of Santiago in 1280 after that order's ranks were decimated in the Battle of Moclín. After the integration into the Order of Santiago, the Order of Santa María de España ceased to exist.

== See also ==
- Siege of Algeciras (1278)
- Alfonso X of Castile
- Sancho IV of Castile
- Pedro de Castilla y Aragón
- Order of Santa María de España
