= Algeciras =

- Municipality
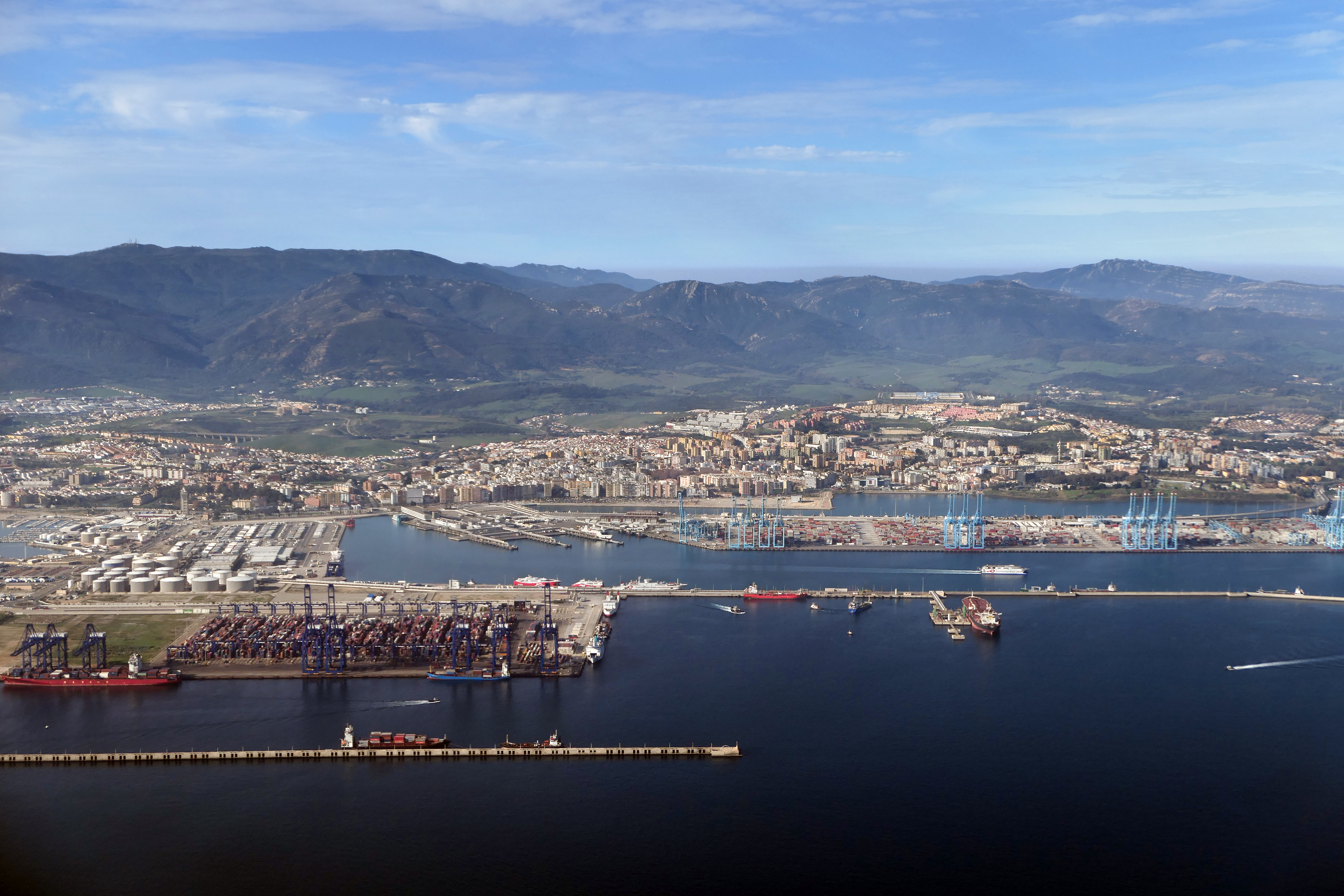

- Flag Coat of arms
- Interactive map of Algeciras
- Coordinates: 36°7′39″N 5°27′14″W
- Country: Spain
- Autonomous community: Andalusia
- Province: Cádiz

Government
  - Type: Ayuntamiento
  - Body: Ayuntamiento de Algeciras
  - Mayor: Jacinto Muñoz Madrid (2026)

Area
  - Municipality: 87.96 km^{2} (33.96 sq mi)
- Elevation: 20 m (66 ft)

Population (2025-01-01)
  - Municipality: 126,589
  - Density: 1,439/km^{2} (3,727/sq mi)
  - Metro: 263,739
- Demonyms: Algecireño (male); Algecireña (female)
- Time zone: UTC+1 (CET)
  - Summer (DST): UTC+2 (CEST)
- Postal code: 11200-11209
- Dialing code: (+34) 956/856
- Website: Official website

Algeciras (Spanish: [alxeˈθiɾas]) is a city and a municipality of Spain belonging to the province of Cádiz, Andalusia. With a registered population as of 2020 of 123,078, it is the most populated municipality of the Campo de Gibraltar. The city is located in the western shore of the Bay of Gibraltar (Bahía de Algeciras) opposite the Rock of Gibraltar, around the mouth of the Río de la Miel, now mostly culverted in its lower course, near the southernmost end of the Iberian Peninsula and continental Europe and the Strait of Gibraltar.

The area was inhabited in Antiquity, including archaeological strata generally identified with the Roman city of Iulia Traducta. Founded soon after the Islamic conquest of the Iberian Peninsula on the mouth of the Río de la Miel, al-Jazira al-Khadrā became the head of a rump taifa kingdom after Umayyad state collapse in the 11th century. In 1275, the Emirate of Granada ceded the place to the Marinids, who founded the new walled precinct of al-Bunayya after 1282 on the opposite bank of the Río de la Miel. The twin medinas were conquered in 1344 by the Crown of Castile. Medieval urban continuity came to an abrupt end when the town was torn down by the Nasrids circa 1369–1385. The ruins were repopulated and the town eventually refounded upon the arrival of refugees from the 1704 Anglo-Dutch capture of Gibraltar.

The Port of Algeciras is one of the largest ports in Europe and the world in three categories: container, cargo and transshipment. The surrounding metropolitan area also includes the municipalities of Los Barrios, La Línea de la Concepción, Castellar de la Frontera, Jimena de la Frontera, San Roque and Tarifa, with a population of 263,739.

== Name ==
The Arabic name for the settlement founded by Muslims after the conquest of the Iberian Peninsula was al-Jazīrah al-Khaḍrāʾ (الجزيرة الخضراء) which means 'green island' or 'green peninsula'. The traditional explanation derives the placename from the tiny island of Isla Verde in front of the city (and currently covered by the port), but this has been questioned as the island was not known as green island in Arab sources but Umm Ḥakīm (as al-Jazīrah al-Khaḍrā was reserved for the city) nor in medieval Christian sources. Likewise, the Spanish-language placename of Isla Verde is not recorded until the late 18th century, co-existing with previous placenames such as Isla de las Palomas. Tentative alternative possibilities about where the Arabic placename comes from rely on identificating the green 'island' or 'peninsula' elsewhere (including the Iberian Peninsula, the green Campo de Gibraltar, paleo-coves in the bay of Gibraltar, or the very same rock of Gibraltar).

Whatever the case, Al-Jazīra(t) gave the modern Spanish Algeciras. (Note: Thus, it shares its etymology with Alzira in the Valencian Community, Lezíria in Portugal, Cizre in Turkey, Gżira in Malta, the Nile island of Gezira in Egypt, the state of Gezira in Sudan, as well as the country of Algeria and its capital, Algiers, as well as with the news network Al Jazeera.) Algeciras' site was also that of Roman cities called Portus Albus ("White Harbor"), Caetaria (current Getares) and Iulia Traducta. In the later "Byzantine" period, the site would come to be known in Greek as Mesopotámenoi (Μεσοποτάμενοι), meaning "between rivers/canals".

== History ==
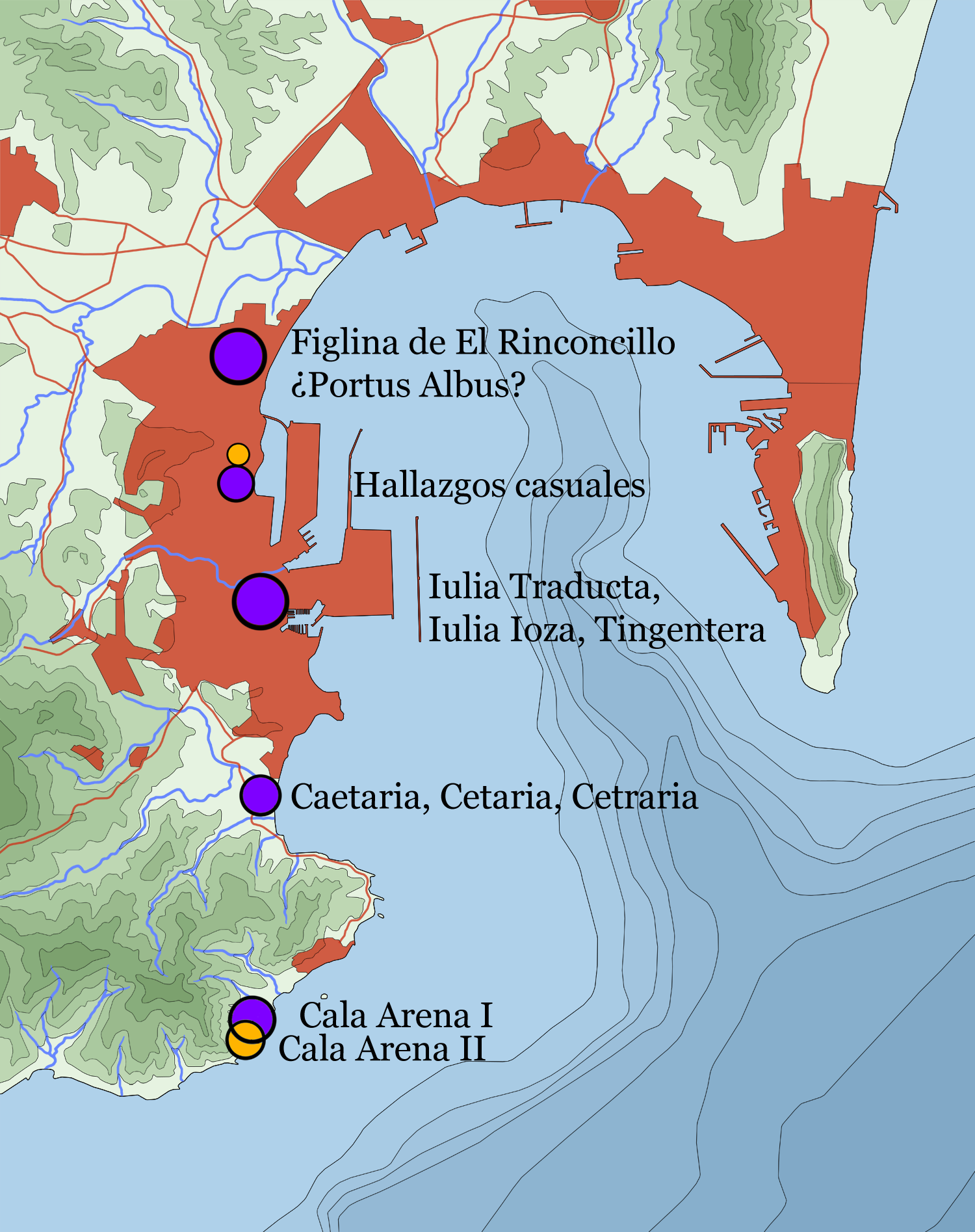
Map of the Roman (purple) and Punic (orange) sites in the municipality of Algeciras.

The area of the city has been populated since prehistory, and the earliest remains belong to Neanderthal populations from the Paleolithic era. Due to its strategic position it was an important port under the Phoenicians, and was the site of the relevant Roman port of Portus Albus ("White Port"), with two nearby cities called Caetaria (possibly founded by the Iberians) and Iulia Traducta, founded by the Romans. Recently it has been proposed that the site of Iulia Traducta was the Villa Vieja of Algeciras. Al-Jazira al-Khadrā was founded few years after the Islamic conquest of the Iberian Peninsula.

In the year 859 AD Viking troops on board 62 longships and commanded by the leaders Hastein and Björn Ironside besieged the city for three days and subsequently laid waste to much of it. After looting the houses of the rich, they burnt the Aljama mosque and the Banderas mosque. Reorganized near the medina, the inhabitants managed to recover the city and make the invaders run away, capturing two boats. In 914, during a period of civil war (fitna) prior to the proclamation of the Caliphate of Córdoba, Cordobese emir Abd al-Rahman III conquered Algeciras, which had provided rebel elements with key logistic support. Shipbuilding docks for the Umayyad navy were then built in Algeciras, presumably in the form of a fortified port.

It enjoyed a brief period of independence as a taifa state from 1035 to 1058. It was named al-Jazirah al-Khadra' ("Green Island") after the offshore Isla Verde; the modern name is derived from this original Arabic name (compare also Algiers and Al Jazeera). In 1055 Emir Al-Mutadid of Seville drove the Berbers from Algeciras, claiming it for Arabs. Vowing to counter the Castilian expansion initiated by 1265, Nasrid Granada required assistance from Fez in late 1274 and ceded the place of Algeciras (together with Tarifa) to the Marinids. In 1278, Algeciras was besieged by the forces of the Kingdom of Castile under the command of Alfonso X of Castile and his son, Sancho. This siege was the first of a series of attempts to take the city and ended in failure for the Castilian forces. An armada sent by Castile was also annihilated whilst trying to blockade the city's harbor.

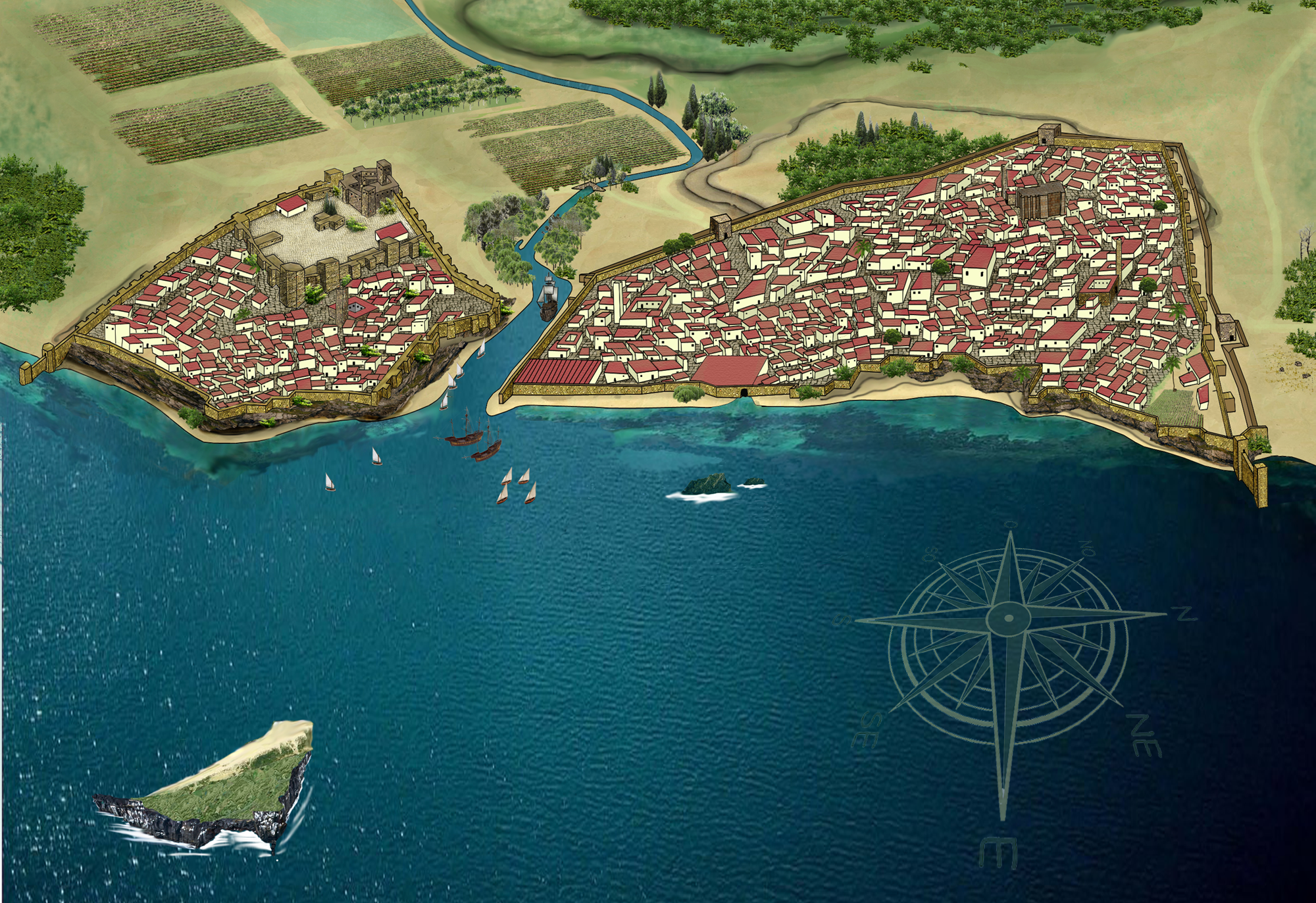
Reconstruction of the two walled precincts on the mouth of the Río de la Miel c. 1344, with the Marinid settlement of al-Bunayya on the left (South) of the picture and al-Jazira al-Khadrā on the right (North)

Marinid ruler Abu Yusuf built a new walled precinct on the opposing bank of the Río de la Miel circa 1282, al-Bunayya, originally as a military camp site in the context of the Battle of the Strait. A substantial share of the workforce dedicated to the former end were Christian slaves. The Marinid grip over the place further increased in the ensuing years, and the place turned into a Marinid stronghold from which razzias were launched into the still incipient Christian settlements in the Lower Guadalquivir and the Guadalete area. Having lost interest in Iberian affairs, Abu Yaqub Yusuf an-Nasr returned Algeciras to the Emirate of Granada in 1295. In July 1309, Ferdinand IV of Castile laid the first Siege of Algeciras as well as Gibraltar. The latter fell into Christian hands, but Muslim Algeciras held on for the following three decades, until Alfonso XI of Castile began a second Siege of Algeciras in 1342. (Note: Juan Núñez de Lara, Juan Manuel, Pedro Fernández de Castro, Juan Alfonso de la Cerda, lord of Gibraleón all participated in the siege, as did knights from France, England and Germany, and even King Philip III of Navarre, king consort of Navarra, who came accompanied by 100 horsemen and 300 infantry.) In March 1344, after several years of siege, Algeciras surrendered.

On winning the city, Alfonso XI made it the seat of a new diocese, established by Pope Clement VI's bull Gaudemus et exultamus of 30 April 1344, and entrusted to the governance of the bishop of Cadiz. The bishops of Cadiz continued to hold the title of Aliezira, as it called, until 1851, when in accordance with a concordat between Spain and the Holy See its territory was incorporated into the diocese of Cadiz. No longer a residential bishopric, Aliezira is today listed by the Catholic Church as a titular see. The town's location far from large Christian urban centres (Seville and Jerez), the proximity to Muslim naval strongholds (Ceuta and Gibraltar), and the difficulties posed by defending such a long walled perimetre made the Christian settlement a challenge. Genoese and Catalan traders settled in the town.

Left relatively unguarded during the Castilian Civil War, the town was easily seized in 1369 by the Nasrids from Granada with assistance from a Marinid fleet. It was destroyed on the orders of Muhammed V of Granada. While tradition asserts that it was torn down immediately after the 1369 occupation, the Nasrid scorched-earth policy has been also dated to 1375, once Granadan repopulation efforts should have failed. The garrison was thus relocated to Gibraltar, with a worse port but more easily defensible, in Nasrid control after the Marinid retreat from the Iberian Peninsula. While the jurisdiction was ceded to Gibraltar in 1462 after the Castilian conquest of the latter place, there are hints about the continued existence of informal settlements by farmers and shepherds in the area, at least after 1466.

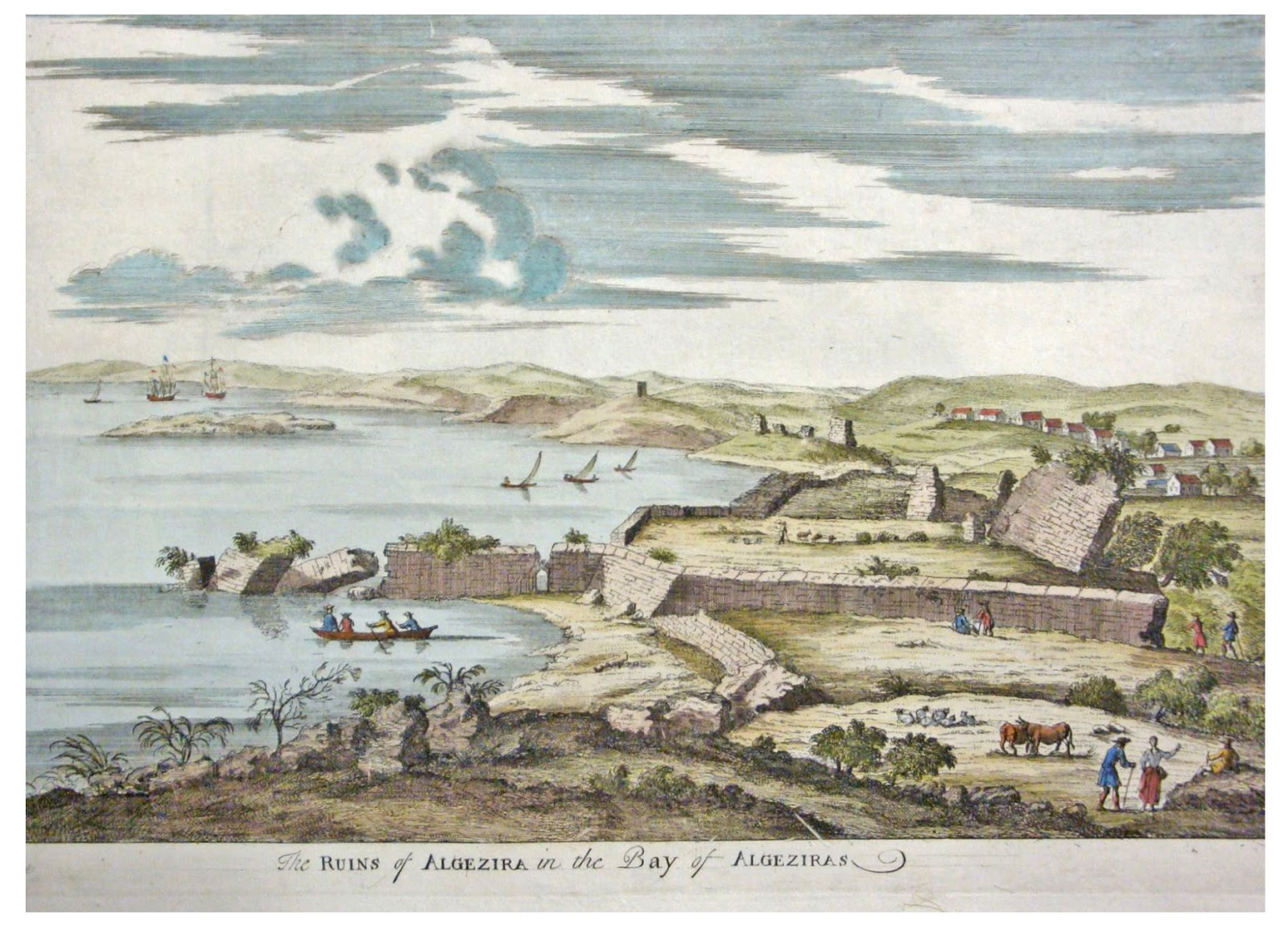
Illustration drawn c. 1716 depicting the ruins of Algeciras.

Algeciras was refounded after 1704 by Spanish refugees from Gibraltar following the territory's capture by Anglo-Dutch forces during the War of the Spanish Succession. In 1705, Algeciras was described as "a heap of stones... only a few hovels scattered here and there, amidst an infinity of ruins." Though the refugees intended on eventually returning to Gibraltar, such plans were abandoned following the 1713 Peace of Utrecht, in which Spain ceded the territory to Britain. During the 18th century, immigration from other parts of Spain and non-Spanish regions such as Italy also increased Algeciras' population, which rose from 1,845 in 1725 to 6,241 in 1787.

Algeciras' social structure featured a comparatively small number of nobles and comparatively larger weight of clergy. Just like the rest of the Campo de Gibraltar, husbandry (cattle in particular) played an important role in the economy during the 18th century thanks to the rich pastures. Given the abundance of international conflicts in the Strait area during the 18th century, privateerring became an important part of the economy. The Strait was fortified to guard against enemy raids with installations such as the Fuerte de Isla Verde built to guard key points. The city was rebuilt on its present rectangular plan by Charles III in 1760. In July 1801, the French and Spanish navies fought the Royal Navy off Algeciras in the Algeciras campaign.

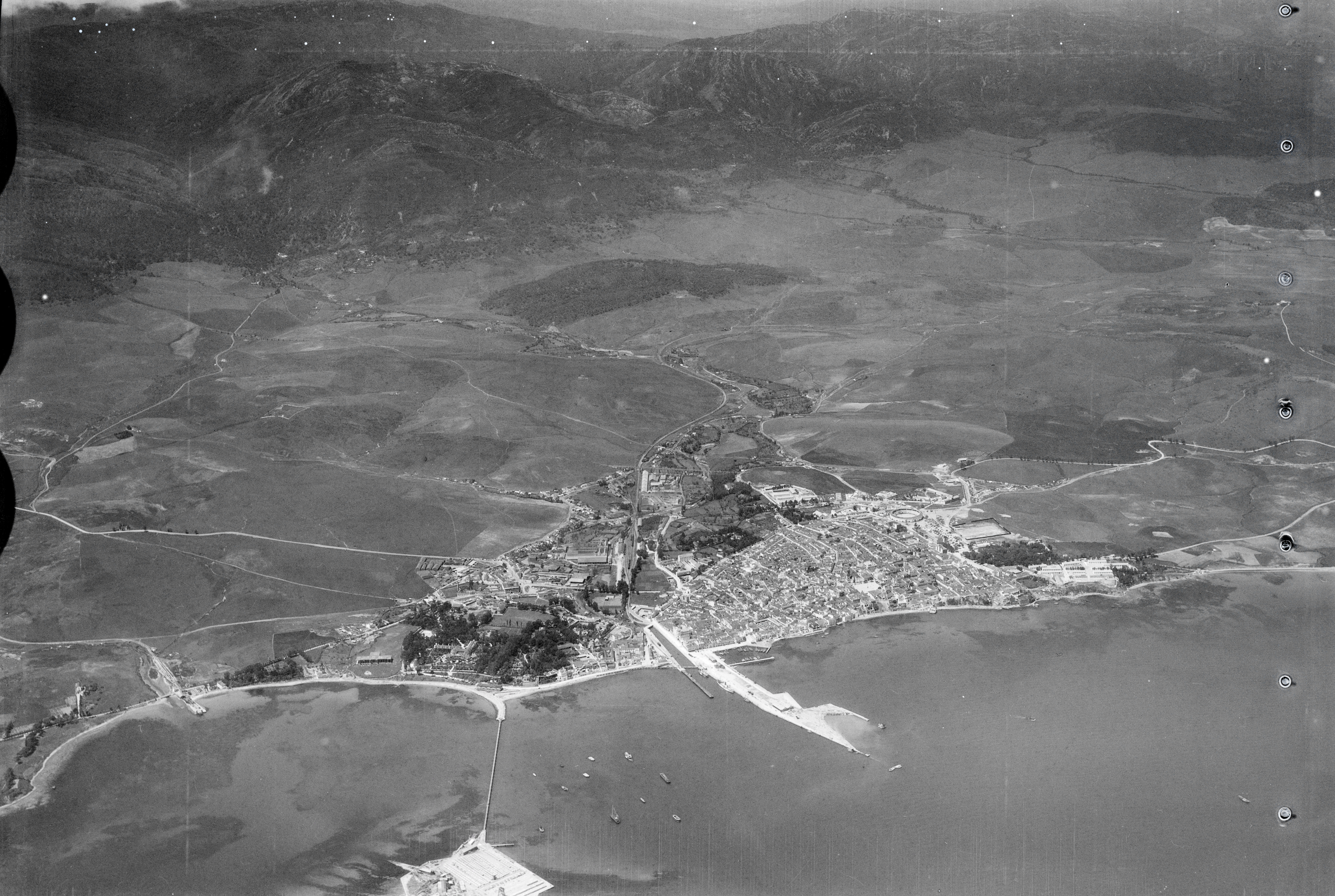
Aerial view of Algeciras taken in May 1928.

The city became the scene for settling a major international crisis as it hosted the Algeciras Conference in 1906. The international forum to discuss the future of Morocco which was held in the Casa Consistorial (town hall). It confirmed the independence of Morocco against threats from Germany, and gave France control of banking and police interests. In July 1942 Italian frogmen set up in a secret base in the Italian tanker Olterra, which was interned in Algeciras, in order to attack shipping in Gibraltar. During the Franco era, Algeciras underwent substantial industrial development, creating many new jobs for the local workers made unemployed when the border between Gibraltar and Spain was sealed by Franco between 1969 and 1982.

In 1982 there was a failed plan codenamed Operation Algeciras conceived by the Argentinian military to sabotage the British military facilities in Gibraltar during the Falklands War. Spanish authorities intervened just before the attack, and deported the two Argentine Montoneros and military liaison officer involved.

== Geography ==
=== Location ===
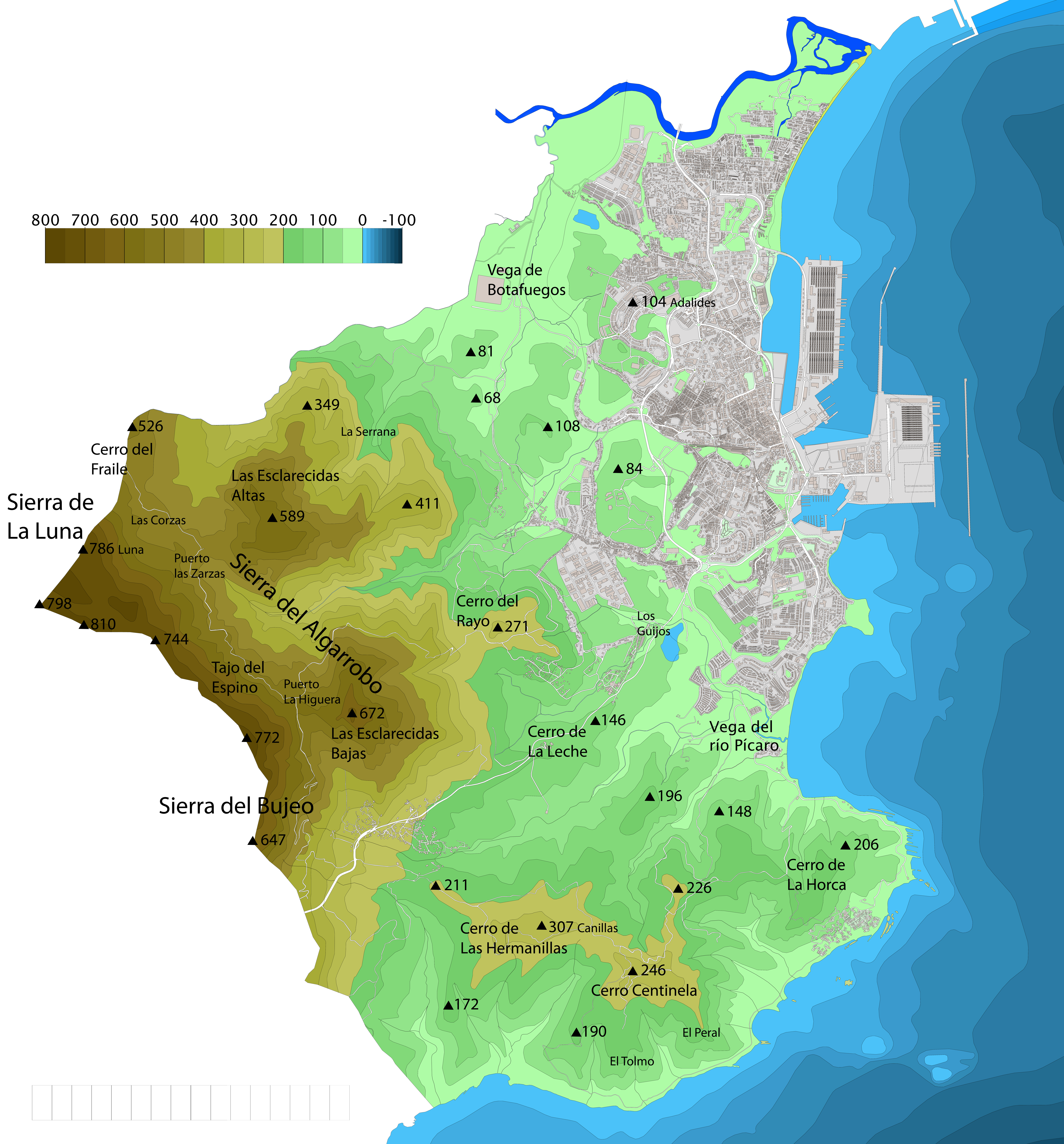
Topographic map of the municipality

Algeciras is located in the southern end of the Iberian Peninsula, in the comarca of Campo de Gibraltar. Its strategic location near the Strait of Gibraltar—the choke point connecting the Atlantic Ocean and the Mediterranean Sea also entailing the nearest distance between Europe and the African continent—has historically powered the importance of the port. The city proper lies on the western bank of the Bay of Gibraltar, fronting the Rock of Gibraltar, which dominates the eastern bank.

The municipality spans across a total area of 87.96 km^{2} (33.96 sq mi), bordering with the municipalities of Los Barrios and Tarifa. The lower course of the river Palmones forms part of the boundary of Algeciras with the municipality of Los Barrios.

The urban agglomeration formed by Algeciras and the surrounding settlements is the sixth largest in Andalusia and the third largest off the region's coast.

=== Climate ===
Algeciras has a Mediterranean subtropical climate (Köppen: Csa) with very mild, rainy winters and warm, dry summers with occasional heat waves, and temperature fluctuations are small because of the strong Oceanic influence. There are no snow registers in the city since the 19th century.

Climate data for Algeciras
Month	Jan	Feb	Mar	Apr	May	Jun	Jul	Aug	Sep	Oct	Nov	Dec	Year
Mean daily maximum °C (°F)	16.1 (61.0)	16.7 (62.1)	17.8 (64.0)	18.9 (66.0)	21.7 (71.1)	24.4 (75.9)	27.2 (81.0)	27.8 (82.0)	26.1 (79.0)	21.7 (71.1)	18.9 (66.0)	16.7 (62.1)	21.2 (70.2)
Daily mean °C (°F)	13.6 (56.5)	13.9 (57.0)	15.0 (59.0)	16.1 (61.0)	18.7 (65.7)	21.1 (70.0)	23.6 (74.5)	24.2 (75.6)	23.1 (73.6)	19.2 (66.6)	16.4 (61.5)	14.5 (58.1)	18.3 (64.9)
Mean daily minimum °C (°F)	11.1 (52.0)	11.1 (52.0)	12.2 (54.0)	13.3 (55.9)	15.6 (60.1)	17.8 (64.0)	20.0 (68.0)	20.6 (69.1)	20.0 (68.0)	16.7 (62.1)	13.9 (57.0)	12.2 (54.0)	15.4 (59.7)
Average precipitation mm (inches)	121.9 (4.80)	106.7 (4.20)	106.7 (4.20)	66.0 (2.60)	38.1 (1.50)	10.2 (0.40)	0.0 (0.0)	2.5 (0.10)	25.4 (1.00)	76.2 (3.00)	149.9 (5.90)	132.1 (5.20)	835.7 (32.90)
Source: The Weather Channel

Temperature of sea (Bay of Gibraltar)
Jan	Feb	Mar	Apr	May	Jun	Jul	Aug	Sep	Oct	Nov	Dec	Year
16 °C (61 °F)	15 °C (59 °F)	16 °C (61 °F)	16 °C (61 °F)	17 °C (63 °F)	19 °C (66 °F)	22 °C (72 °F)	22 °C (72 °F)	22 °C (72 °F)	20 °C (68 °F)	18 °C (64 °F)	17 °C (63 °F)	18.4 °C (65.1 °F)

== Demographics ==
Historical population

Year	Pop.	±%
1842	11,077	—
1857	16,198	+46.2%
1860	18,216	+12.5%
1877	11,865	−34.9%
1887	11,924	+0.5%
1897	12,760	+7.0%
1900	13,131	+2.9%

Year	Pop.	±%
1910	15,020	+14.4%
1920	19,249	+28.2%
1930	20,674	+7.4%
1940	26,114	+26.3%
1950	52,392	+100.6%
1960	66,021	+26.0%
1970	79,997	+21.2%

Year	Pop.	±%
1981	85,390	+6.7%
1991	101,256	+18.6%
2001	101,468	+0.2%
2011	117,695	+16.0%
2021	123,435	+4.9%

- 1857 and 1860: De facto census population, according to the INE.
- 1842 and 1877–2021: De jure census population, according to the INE.

== Economy ==
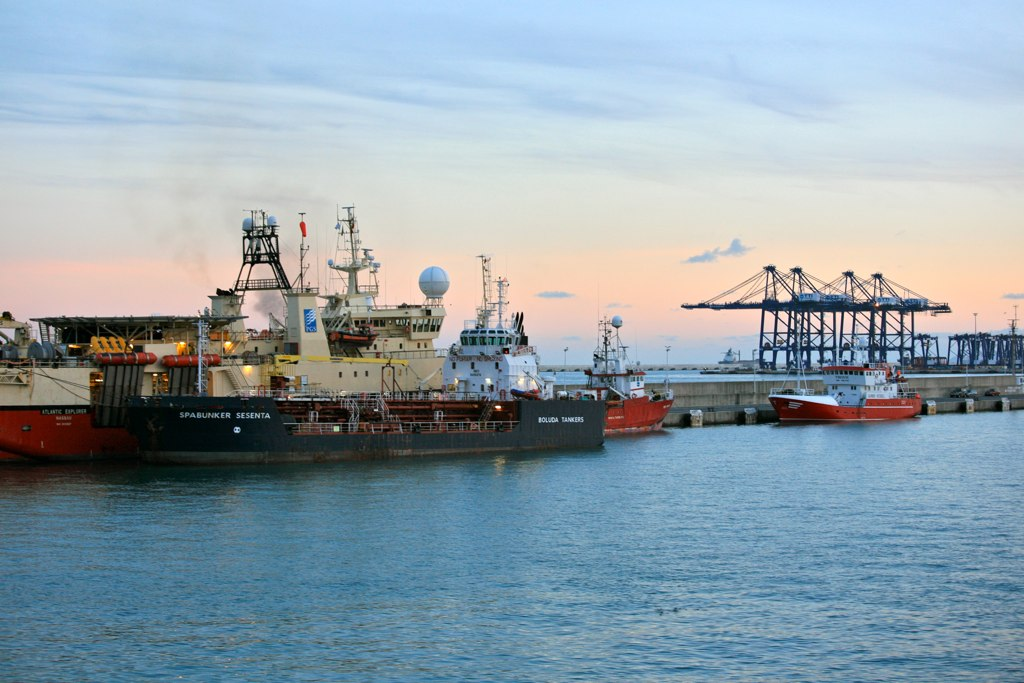
Port of Algeciras

Algeciras is principally a transport hub and industrial city. Its main activities are connected with the Port of Algeciras, which serves as the main embarkation point between Spain and Tangier and other ports in Morocco as well as the Canary Islands and the Spanish enclaves of Ceuta and Melilla. It is ranked as the 16th busiest port in the world. The city also has a substantial fishing industry and exports a range of agricultural products from the surrounding area, including cereals, tobacco and farm animals.

In recent years it has become a significant tourist destination, with popular day trips to Tarifa to see bird migrations; to Gibraltar to see the territory's sights and culture; and to the Bay of Gibraltar on whale watching excursions.

Algeciras is the southern terminus of two principal north–south Euroroutes, the E05 and E15. Both routes, moreover, run to Scotland (the E05 terminates at Greenock and the E15 at Inverness) via France and England.

== Tourism ==
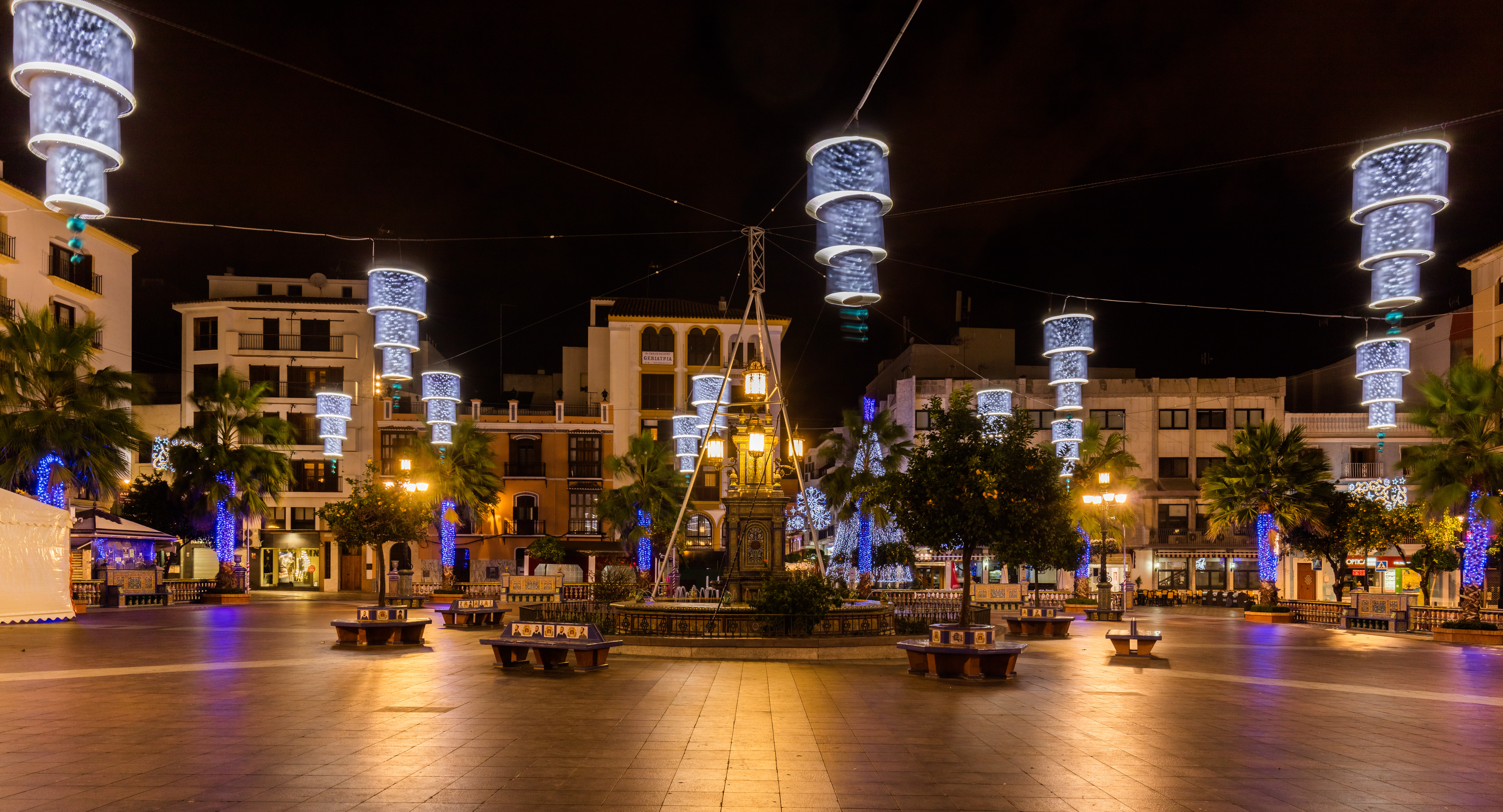
Plaza Alta.

Places of interest include:

- Parque Natural del Estrecho
- Parque Natural Los Alcornocales
- Bahía Park
- Centro Comercial Puerta Europa

== Transport ==
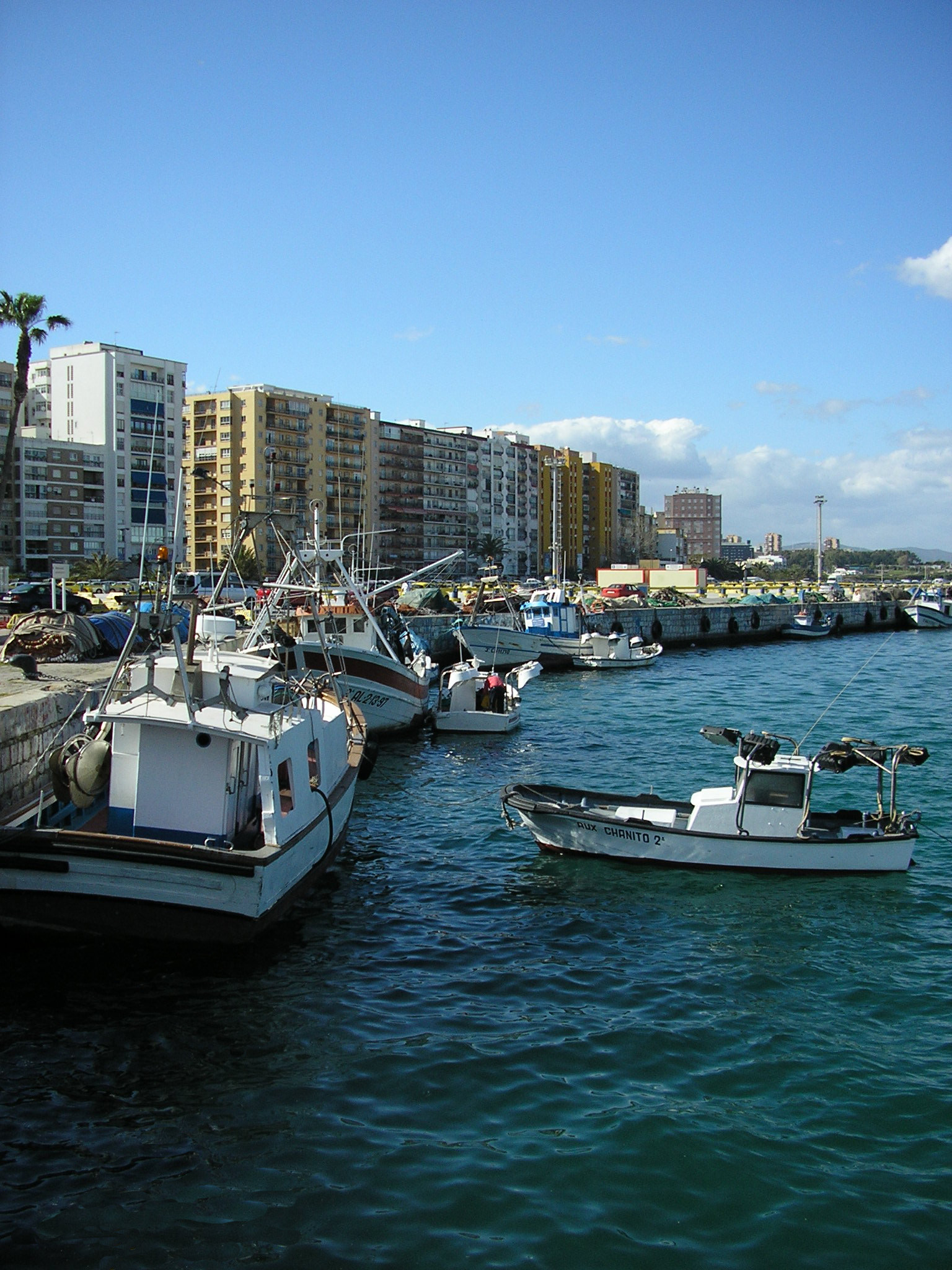
Fishing port in Algeciras

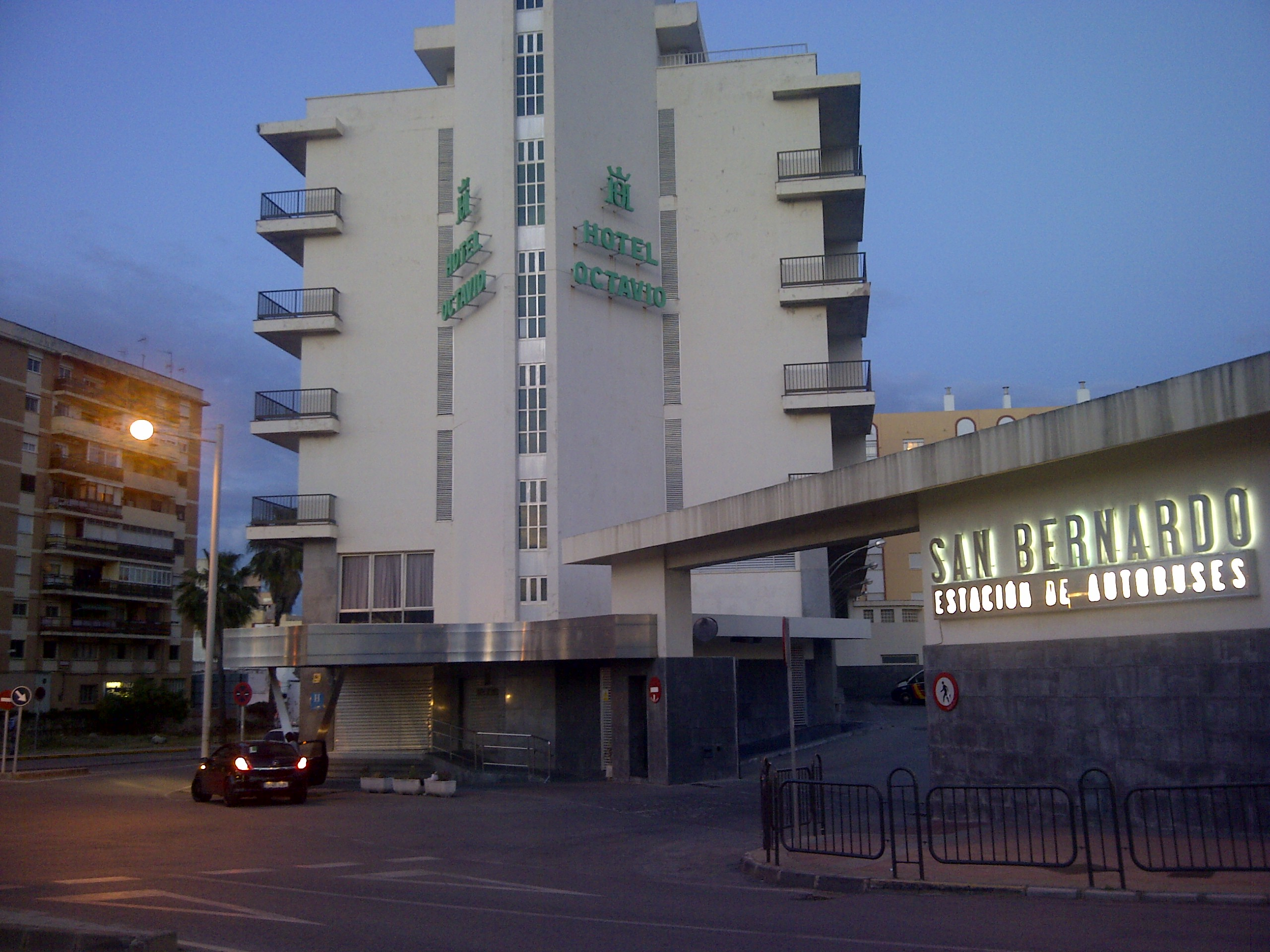
San Bernardo Bus Station

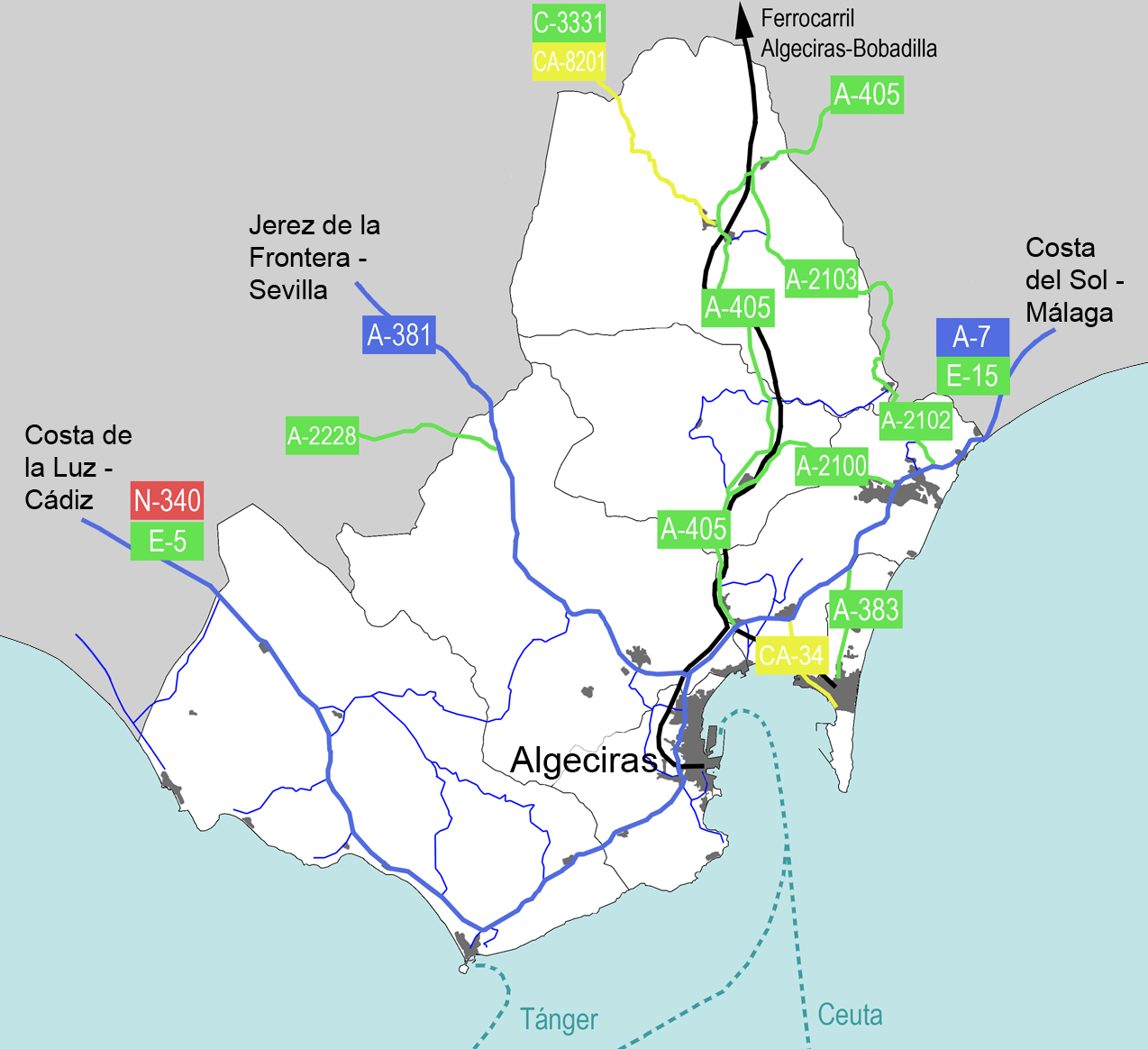
Transport links of Algeciras

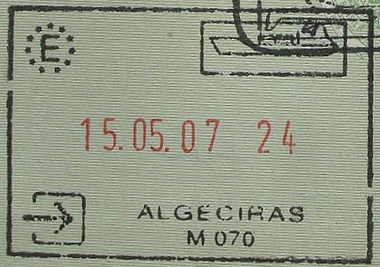
Passport stamp from the Port of Algeciras

=== Public transport ===
The bus urban transport in managed by C.T.M. (Cooperativa de transporte de Marruecos).

- Bus lines:
  - Line 1: Bajadilla-Pajarete
  - Line 2: Colinas-San Bernabé-Reconquista
  - Line 3: Rinconcillo
  - Line 4: La Granja
  - Line 5: Bahía de Algeciras
  - Line 6: Juliana
  - Line 7: Saladillo
  - Line 8: San García-Saladillo
  - Line 9: San García Directo
  - Line 10: El Cobre
  - Line 11: La Piñera
  - Line 12: San García playa
  - Line 16: Cementerio-Centro Penitenciario
  - Line 18: Cortijo Vides-Piñera
  - Line 19: Puerto-S.J.Artesano-Rinconcillo
  - Line 21: San García – Residencia – Puerto – Parque

=== Rail ===
The Algeciras Gibraltar Railway Company built the Algeciras-Bobadilla railway line, which connects Algeciras railway station to Bobadilla, Antequera and continues to the rest of Spain, the train line terminates near the port of Algeciras.

=== Road ===
The main routes serving Algeciras include:

- European route E15
- European route E05
- Autopista AP-7
- Autovía A-48
- N-340
- GR 7

=== Intercity buses ===
The main bus station is located next to the train station. Several bus companies operate intercity bus services from and to Algeciras.

=== Airport ===
The nearest airports are:

- Gibraltar Airport – to 20 km (12 mi)
- Jerez Airport – to 100 km (62 mi)
- Málaga Airport – to 120 km (75 mi)

In addition, Algeciras has the Algeciras Heliport for transport to Ceuta and other areas in the region.

== Monuments ==
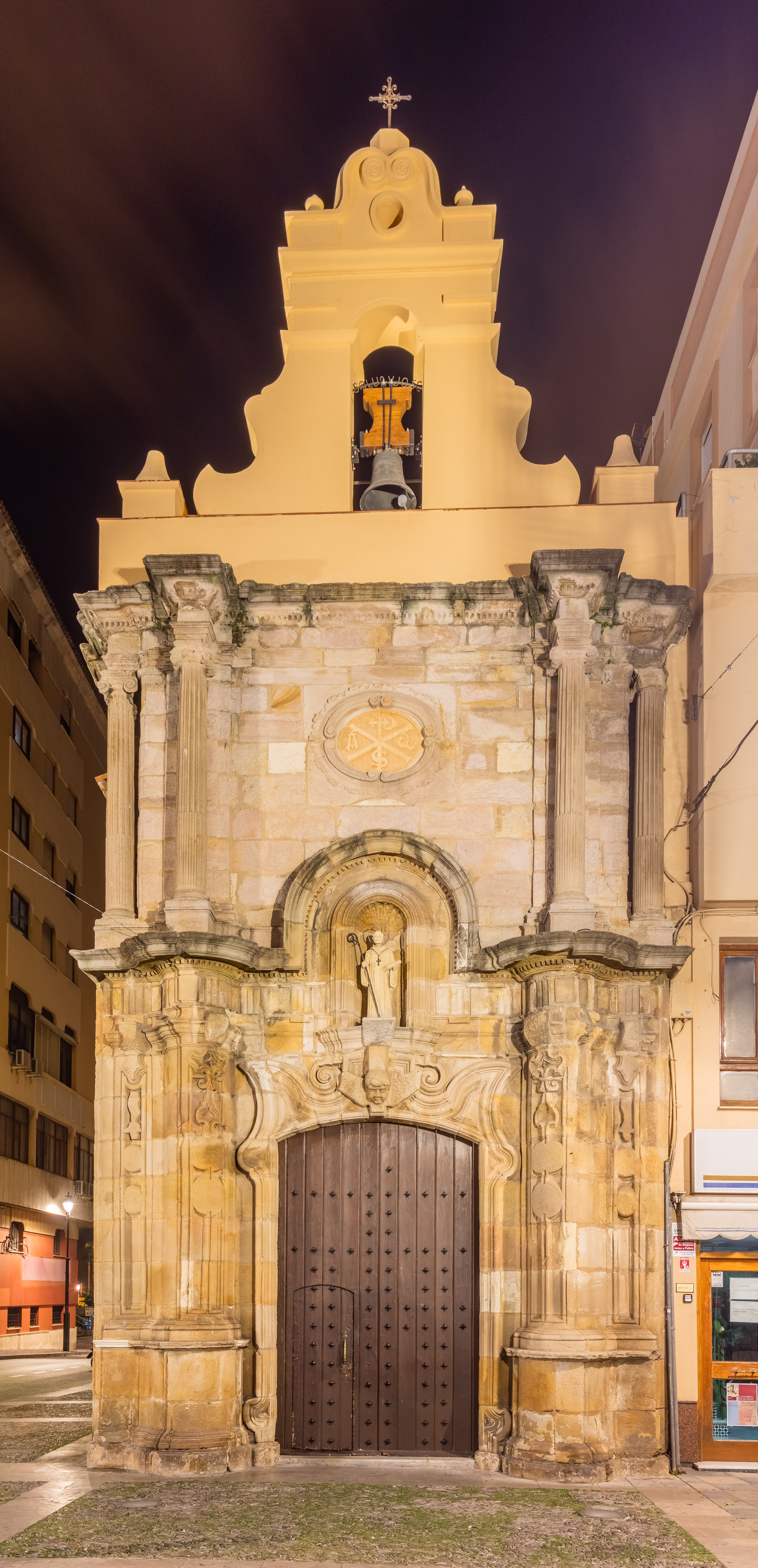
Capilla de Nuestra Señora de Europa

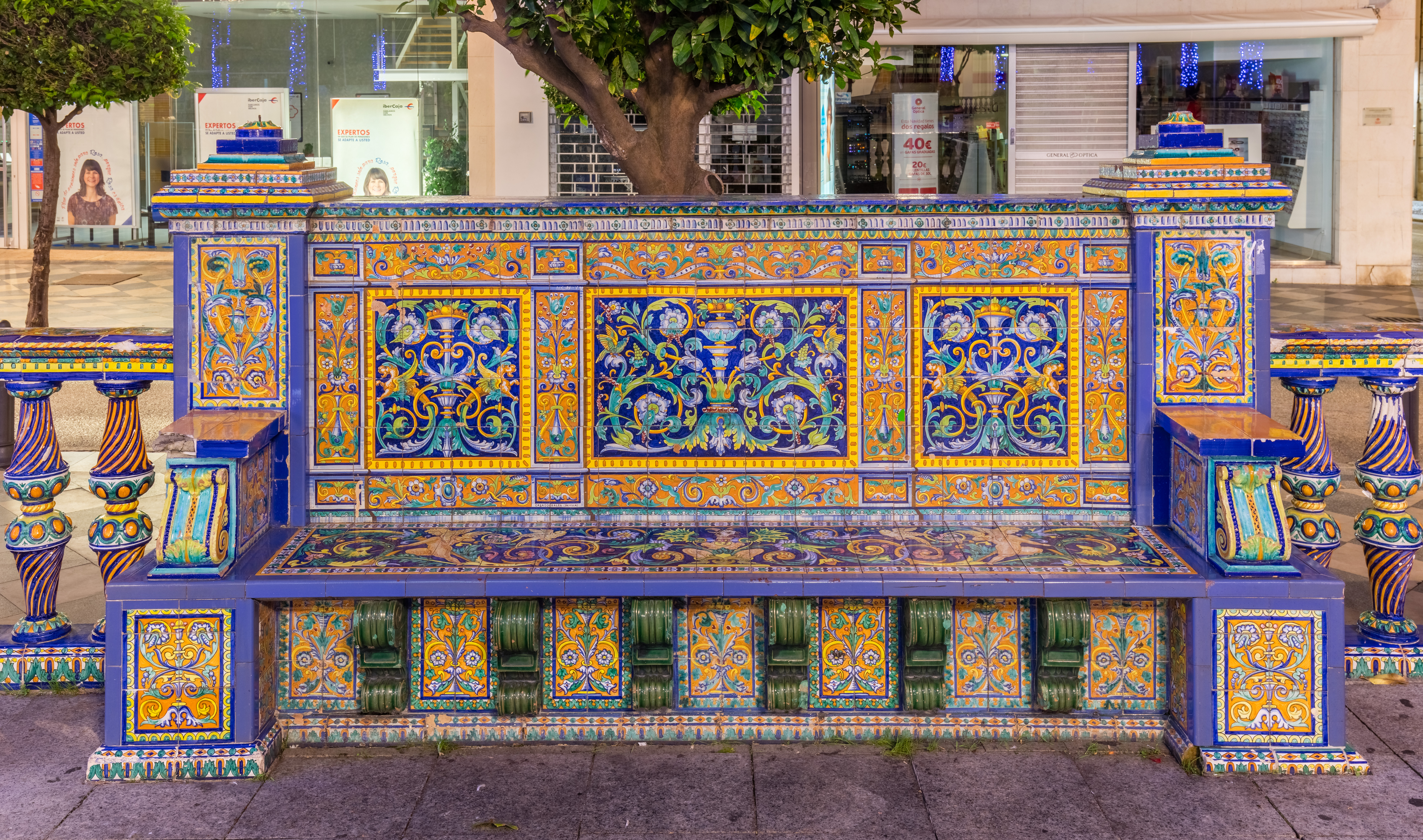
Elaborate bench in Plaza Alta.

- Hornos Romanos del Rinconcillo (first century B.C.). (furnaces)
- Factoría de salazones de la calle San Nicolás (first century). (salt meat factory)
- La Villa Vieja, torres de la Huerta del Carmen (tenth century). (Towers)
- Parque Arqueológico de las Murallas Meriníes (thirteenth century). (Archeological Park)
- Capilla de Nuestra Señora de Europa (1690). (Chapel)
- Iglesia de Nuestra Señora de la Palma (1736). (Church)
- Hospital de La Caridad, (1748).
- Capilla de la Caridad (1752). (Chapel)
- Casa Consistorial (1756). (City Council)
- Capilla de San Servando (1774). (Chapel)
- Capilla del Santo Cristo de la Alameda (1776). (Chapel)
- Plaza Alta (1807). (Town Square)
- Mercado de Abastos de Algeciras of engineer Eduardo Torroja Miret (1935). (Supplies Market)
- Art School Building. (1971) architect: Fernando Garrido Gutiérrez.
- Faro de Isla Verde. Project of Jaime Font, constructed in 1864. (Light)
- Hotel Reina Cristina (1901). (Hotel)
- District de San Isidro, (typical district designed in the twentieth century)

== Celebrations ==
- Arrastre de latas (5th, January).
- Feria Real de Algeciras (June).
- Fiestas patronales en honor de Ntra. Sra. la Virgen de la Palma (August).
- Fiesta de los Tosantos (1st, November).
- Carnival of Algeciras.

== Sports ==
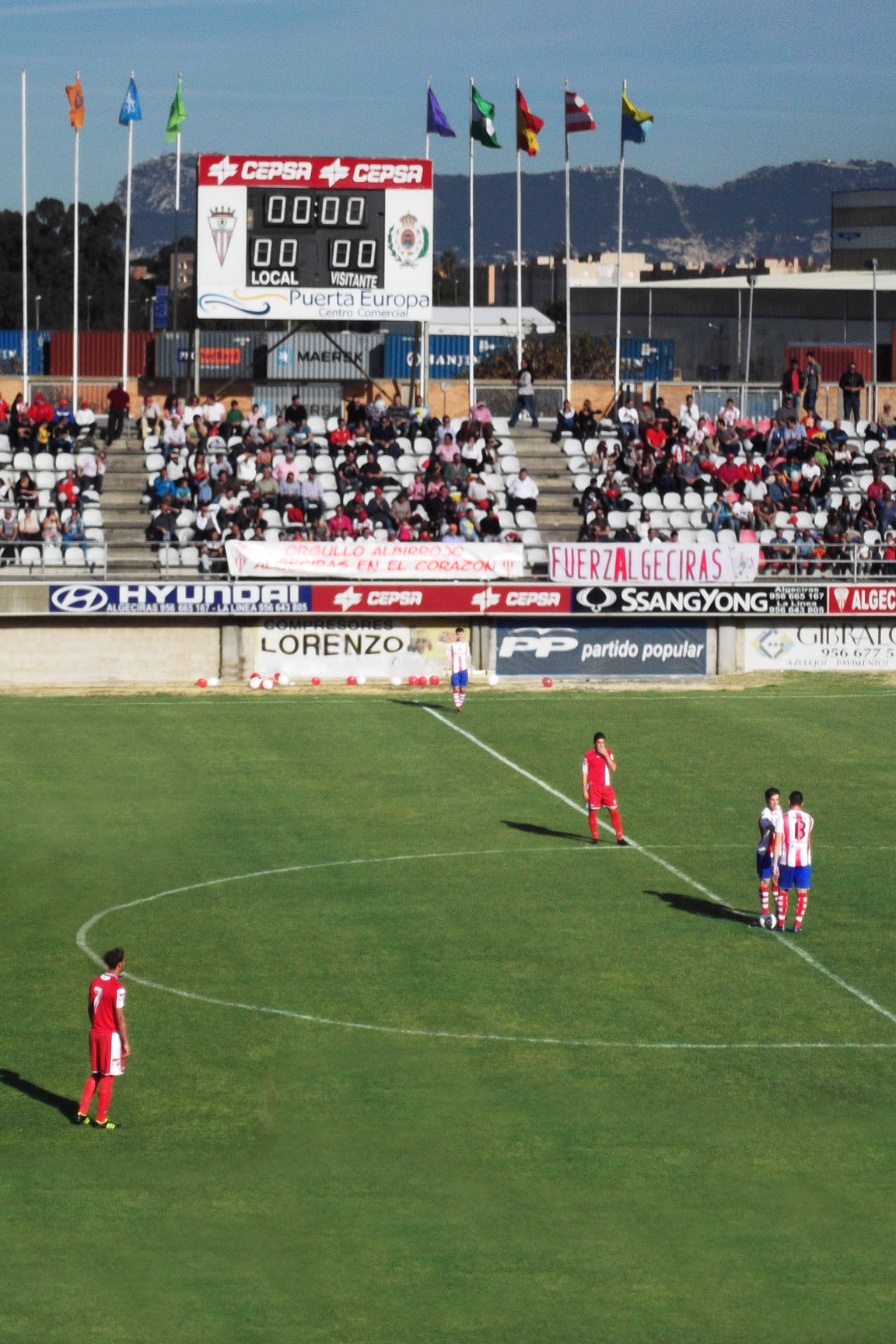
Algeciras CF at the Estadio Nuevo Mirador.

Algeciras CF, the association football club, founded in 1912, most commonly play in the third (Primera Federación) and fourth-tiers of the Spanish football league system, with some past spells in Segunda División. They play home games at the Estadio Nuevo Mirador.

Algeciras BM, the professional handball club, played in the Liga ASOBAL between 2005 and 2008. The team was dissolved due to enormous debts after relegation to second level in 2008.

== Education ==
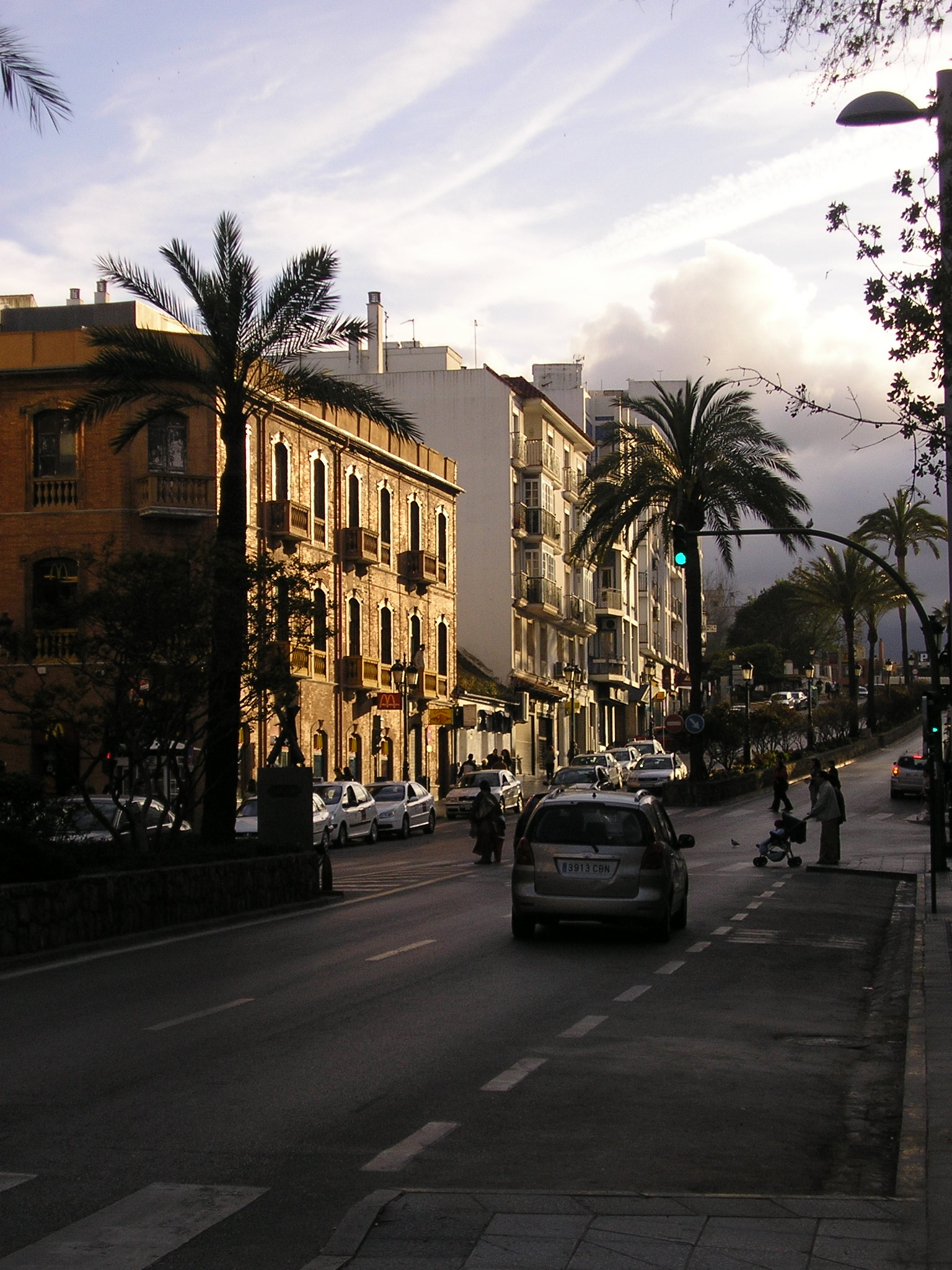
Avenida Blas Infante

=== Universidad de Cádiz – Campus Bahia de Algeciras ===
The following education centres are property of the University of Cádiz:

- Escuela Politécnica Superior de Algeciras
- Escuela Universitaria de Enfermería de Algeciras
- Escuela Universitaria de Estudios Jurídicos y Económicos del Campo de Gibraltar "Francisco Tomás y Valiente"
- Escuela Universitaria de Magisterio "Virgen de Europa"
- Centro Universitario de Derecho de Algeciras (CUDA)
- Campus Bahia de Algeciras (in Spanish and English)

== Noted Natives of Algeciras ==
- Yahya Ibn Yahya
- Paco de Lucía
- Ramón de Algeciras
- Al-Mansur Ibn Abi Aamir
- Ana Belén Palomo
- Cristóbal Delgado Gómez
- José María Sánchez-Verdú
- Álvaro Morte
- Canelita

== Sister cities ==
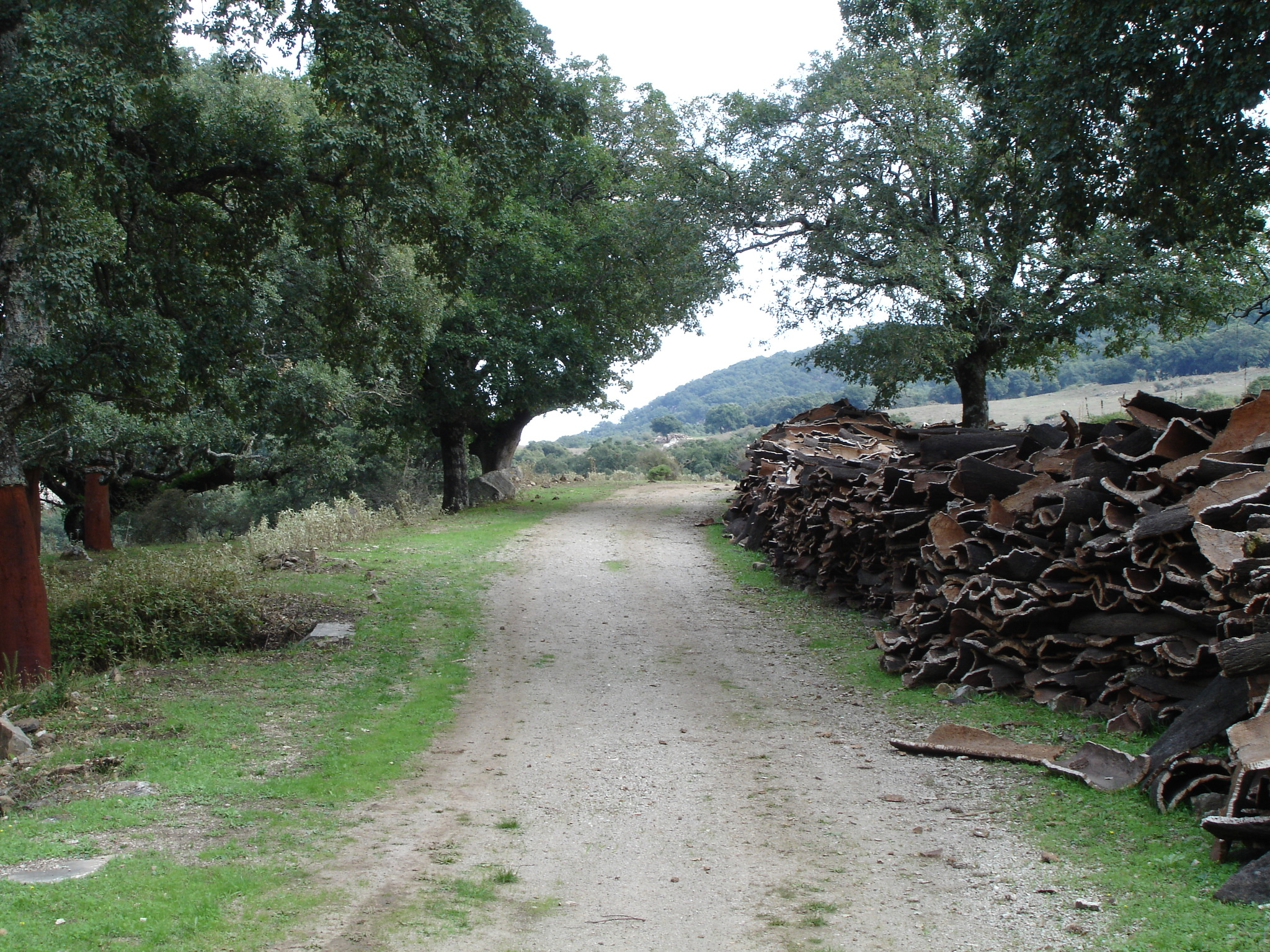
Los Alcornocales Natural Park

- Ceuta, Spain
- Neda, Spain
- Dakhla, Western Sahara

== See also ==
- List of port cities of the Mediterranean Sea
- List of municipalities in Cádiz
