= Pedro Núñez =

Spanish noble

Cross of the Order of Santiago.

Pedro Núñez was a Spanish noble. He was a master of the Order of Santa María de España and Grand Master of the Order of Santiago from 1280 to 1286. He became Grand Master of the order after the death of Gonzalo Ruiz Girón during the reign of Alfonso X of Castile. He was succeeded to the Grand Mastership by Gonzalo Martel. Pedro Nuñez (priest)

== Order of Santa María de España ==
Founded on the initiative of Alfonso X of Castile, Pedro Núñez was named master of the order after the Battle of Moclín.

== Grand Master of the Order of Santiago ==
Pedro Núñez was named Grand Master of the Order of Santiago to save it from extinction. Following the disastrous Spanish defeat after the Battle of Moclín, the future of the order was threatened due to the deaths of many of its members. To this end, Alfonso X of Castile integrated the Order of Santa María de España into that of Santiago.

Preceded by Gonzalo Ruiz Girón	Grand Master of the Order of Santiago; 1280–1286	Succeeded by Gonzalo Martel

== See also ==
- Order of Santa María de España
- Order of Santiago

== Bibliography ==
- González Jiménez, Manuel (20 March 2010). "Relaciones de las Ordenes Militares castellanas con la Corona (siglos XII-XIII)". Historia, Instituciones, Documentos (18). Universidad de Sevilla: Departamento de Historia Medieval y Ciencias y Técnicas Historiográficas: 209–222. ISSN 0210-7716.
