= Carmen Camacho (writer) =

Spanish writer (born 1976)

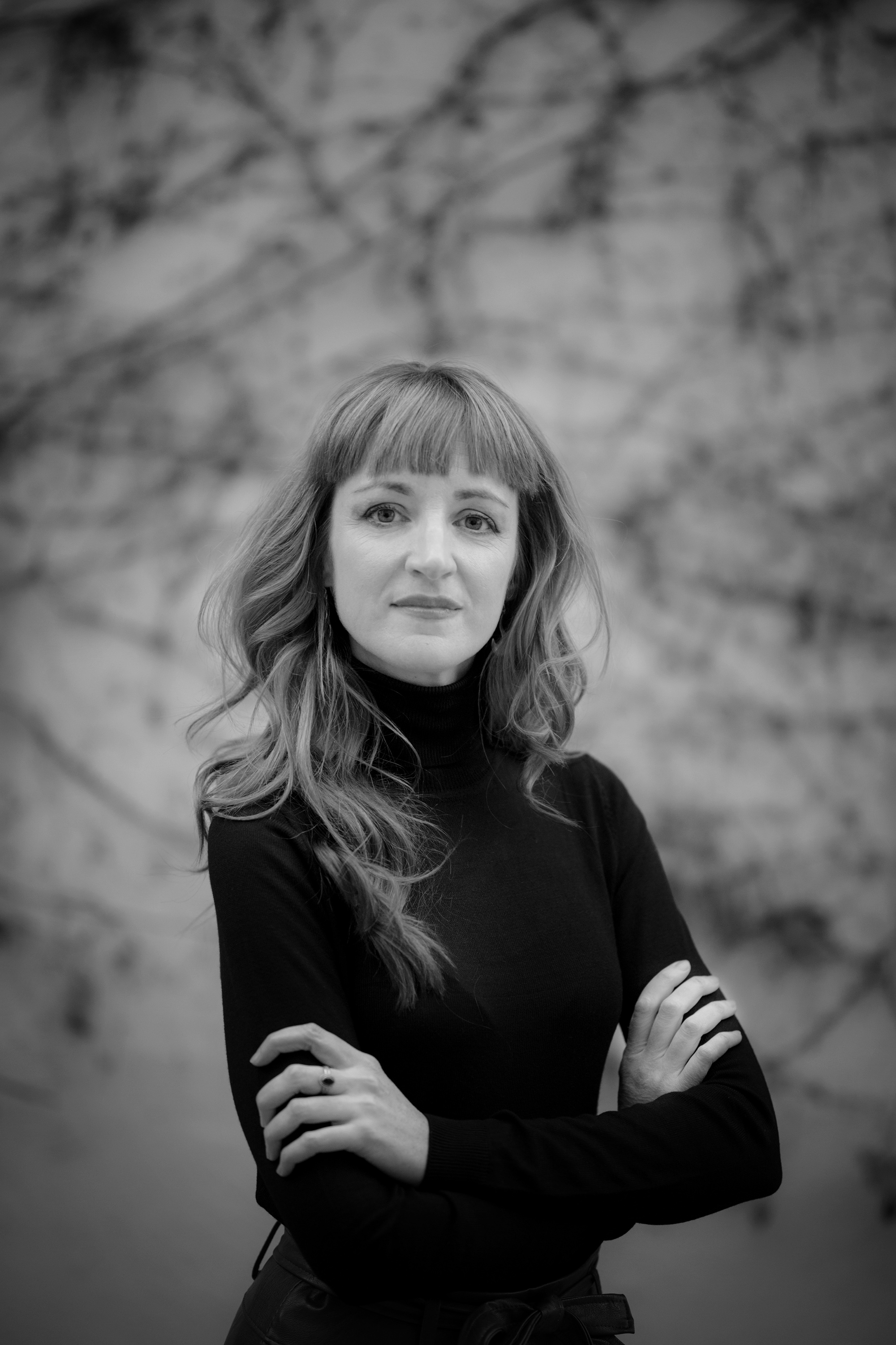
- Carmen Camacho in 2018
- Born: Carmen Camacho García; 1976 (age 49–50); Alcaudete, Jaén, Spain
- Education: Complutense University of Madrid
- Occupation: writer
- Writing career
- Genres: flash fiction; aphorisms
- Notable awards: La Voz + Joven poetry prize
- Website: www.carmencamacho.net

Carmen Camacho García (born 1976) is a Spanish writer of flash fiction and aphorisms. In addition writing a weekly columns, her work has been published in magazines and poetry collections.

== Biography ==
Carmen Camacho García was born in Alcaudete, Jaén, in 1976. She has a degree in journalism from the Complutense University of Madrid. She resides in Seville.

In addition to her literary activity, Camacho collaborates with the Diario de Sevilla on a weekly basis with her column "Cambio de significado" (Change of meaning). Her texts are collected in more than 40 anthologies and some have been translated into Italian, French, Portuguese, Arabic and Armenian. Many of her poems are collected in anthologies of contemporary Spanish poetry, aphorisms and flash fiction. Some of these works are: (Tras)Lúcidas. Poesía escrito por mujeres 1980-2016 (Bartleby, 2016); Exploradoras (Libros de la herida, 2015); Taquinia (La isla de Siltolá, 2015); Canto e demolizione (Thauma Edizioni, 2013); Pensar por lo breve. Aforística española de entresiglos (Trea, 2013); and Geometría y angustia. Poetas españoles en Nueva York (José Manuel Lara Foundation, 2012). She has also created anthologies such as Seré bre- / -aforismos y otras breverías (2015) and Punto de Partida. 10 jóvenes desde Andalucía (Mexico, 2006).

Camacho has published in national and international journals. In 2016, she published the book of aphorisms Zona Franca. Camacho has stated that some of her aphorisms are inspired by "how ordinary people speak, those who know nothing about language and, what's more, believe they can't explain themselves and yet they explain themselves better than anyone else, they possess a powder keg of economy of language, poetry, freedom, rhythm, workmanship, in short, effectiveness".

Throughout her career, Camacho has worked in the area between words and the arts. She has developed works of stage poetry, theatrical adaptations, and various projects in collaboration with photographers, painters, illustrators, musicians, and other artists from various disciplines. Among her works is Toma de Tierra, in which she combines her spoken word texts with the cante jondo of Juan Murube and the contemporary dance of Raquel López Lobato. Under preparation is a spoken word piece, created with the rocker, Dogo.

== Awards and honours ==
She won the 2008 La Voz + Joven poetry prize, from the Obra Social y Cultural Caja Madrid.

== Selected works ==
=== Poetry collections ===
- 777 : a venir de venir por venir, 2007
- Arrojada, 2007
- Minismás, 2008
- Versus: 12 rounds, 2009
- La mujer del tiempo, 2011
- Campo de fuerza, 2012
- Vuelo doméstico, 2014
- Las versiones de Eva, 2014
- Zona franca, 2016
- Fuegos de palabras, 2018

=== Published in magazines ===
- Alhucema
- The Children's Book of American Birds
- El Invisible Anillo
- La cinta de Moebius
- Mordisco
- Nayagua
- 25 cosas
- Retaguardia
- Manual de Lecturas Rápidas para la Supervivencia
- Impracabeza
- Revista Kirtsch
- Volandas
- El Diván
- Cámara Lenta
- Chimicheca
- Luvina
- Parteaguas
- Punto de Partida
- Agitadoras
