= Cristóbal Delgado Gómez =

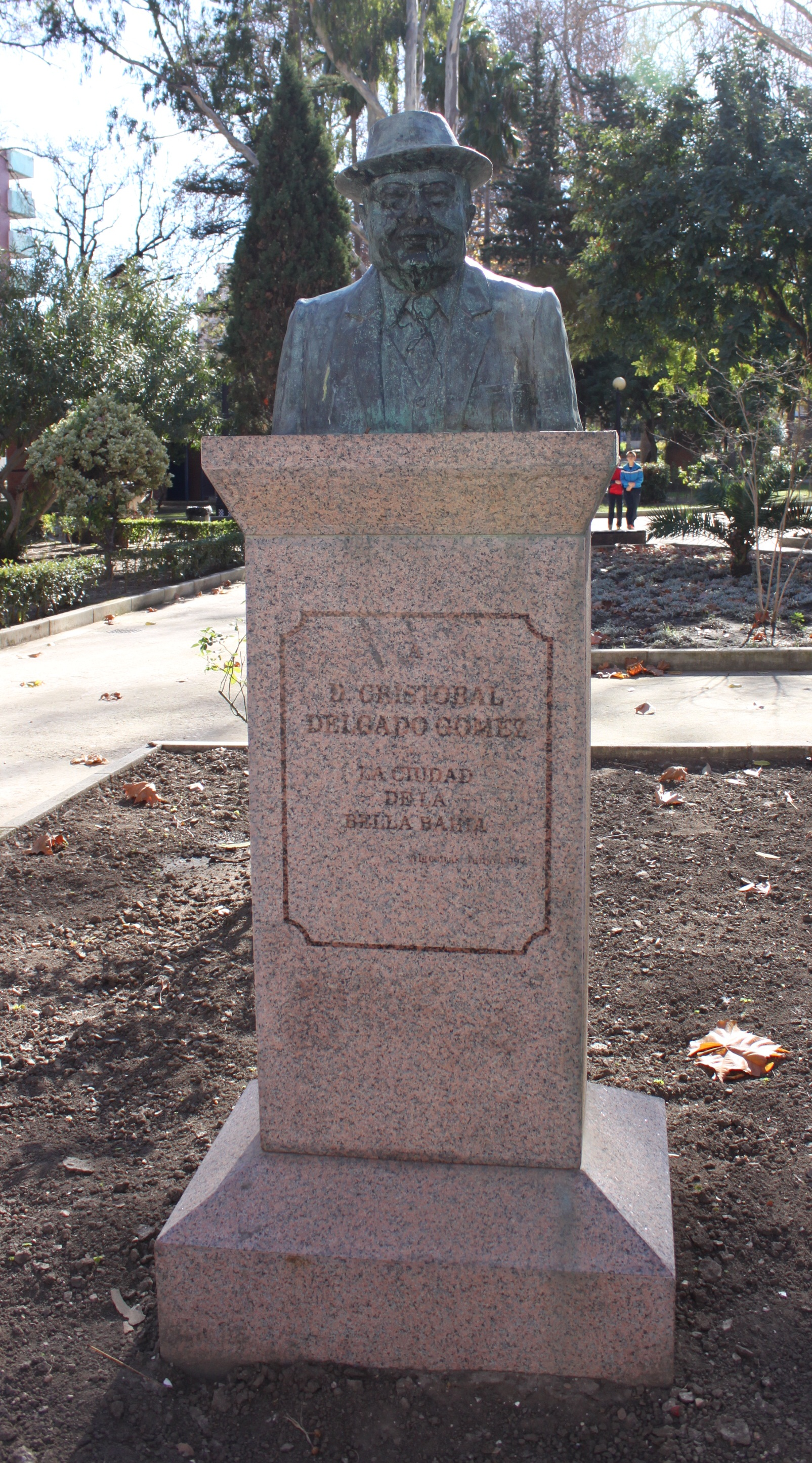
- Statue of Cristóbal Delgado Gómez
- Born: December 23, 1926; Algeciras
- Died: December 30, 2006 (age 80)
- Occupations: historian; musician; writer

Cristóbal Delgado Gómez (December 23, 1926 - December 30, 2006) was a Spanish historian, musician, and author. He was considered the leading expert on Algeciras, having written many books about the city and being employed as the city's official historian. He worked as an officer of the Central Government from 1943 until 1990.

== Biography ==
Delgado Gómez was born in Algeciras in 1926. As a young man, he taught piano and music theory at several schools in his city. He also served as an assistant professor in modeling at the Algeciras School of Arts and Crafts. From a young age, he was interested in local history and participated in numerous municipal projects. In 1962, he became the city's official chronicler, and a year later, he became director of the town library after the death of Juan Pérez Arriete, who held both positions until 1961.

As the director of the local library, Delgado Gómez conducted a thorough modernization of the entity which was created in 1925 by another chronicler of Algeciras, Manuel Pérez-Petinto. Delgado Gómez was the responsible for the construction of a new library headquarters in 1966 to replace an earlier one which was housed in the Algeciras Building Society. His career also included the position of Delegate of Culture in the municipality since 1963; from 1966 through 1970, he was the city's first deputy mayor.

In 1969, he published his first book Algeciras, past and present of the city of the beautiful bay. Subsequently, he devoted much of his time to historical research. He lectured throughout the Spanish territory at conferences and wrote a dozen books on the history of the city and its local institutions. He became a member of the Institute of Campo de Gibraltar in 1970, a member of the Institute of Gaditanos in 1970, and a favorite son of the city on January 23, 1986. Until he died, in 2006, he continued to participate in the city's local events, sharing his knowledge in newspapers and on the radio.

== Works ==
- Algeciras, pasado y presente de la ciudad de la bella bahía (5 ediciones entre 1969 y 1990).
- Algeciras, Feria Real (1989).
- Cosas de Algeciras (1989).
- Carnavales de Ayer (1990) Delegación de Feria y Fiestas de Algeciras.
- El Real Club Náutico de Algeciras (1993).
- Algeciras en Blanco y Negro (1994) Fundación Municipal de Cultura José Luis Cano.
- Algeciras y el carnaval "especial" (1997) Delegación de Feria y Fiestas de Algeciras.
- Algeciras y Yo (1999) Delegación de Feria y Fiestas de Algeciras.
- Algeciras Feria Real (2001) Fundación Municipal de Cultura José Luis Cano.
- Memorias de un algecireño (2004) Fundación Municipal de Cultura José Luis Cano.
