= Battle of Moclín (1280) =

Part of the Reconquista

- Part of the Reconquista
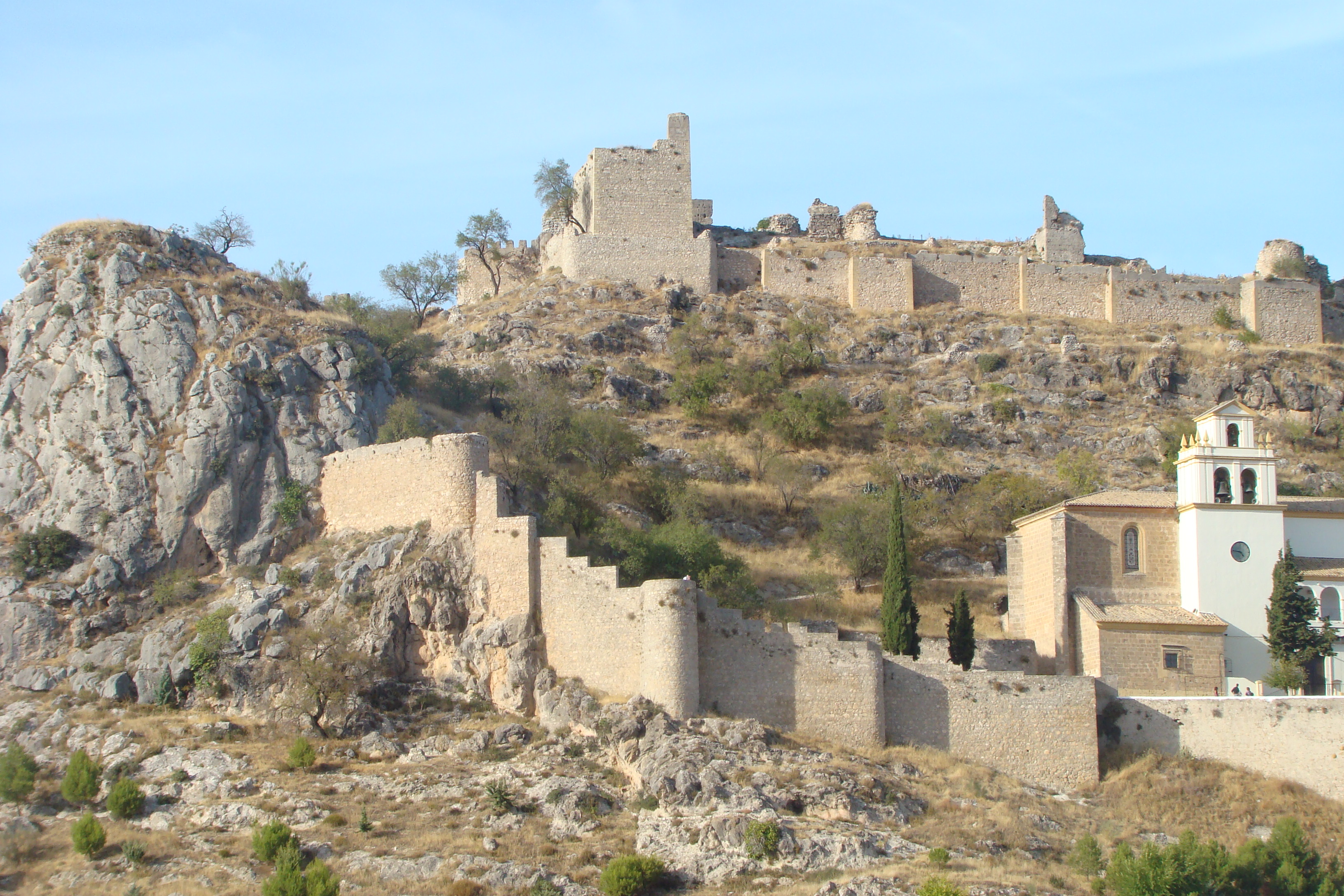
- The castle at Moclín.
Date	23 June 1280
Location	Moclín, Emirate of Granada, Spain 37°20′20″N 3°47′10″W
Result	Granadan victory

Belligerents
Crown of Castile; Order of Santiago	Emirate of Granada

Commanders and leaders
Infante Sancho; Gonzalo Ruiz Girón †	Muhammad II

Casualties and losses
More than 2,800 killed	Figures unknown
- Location within Province of Granada Battle of Moclín (1280) (Spain)

The Battle of Moclín, also known as the Disaster of Moclín took place in the Granadian municipality of Moclín on 23 June 1280. The battle pitted the troops of the Emirate of Granada, commanded by Muhammad II, the Sultan of Granada, against those of the Kingdom of Castile and the Kingdom of León who were composed mainly of mercenaries and of members of the Order of Santiago, being commanded by the contemporary grand master of the order Gonzalo Ruiz Girón and by Sancho, son of King Alfonso X of Castile.

== Background ==
Between February and March 1280, Alfonso X of Castile and his council convened a meeting in the city of Badajoz to finalize preparations for war against Muhammad II and the Emirate of Granada. Most of the members of the royal family were present at this meeting, except the queen, Violant of Aragon, who had become estranged from the king. Alfonso X ordered his forces to be gathered in the city of Córdoba, from where they would commence operations into the Vega de Granada. Alfonso was struck with an eye ailment and was unable to accompany his army on the campaign and instead stayed in the city of Córdoba.

== Battle ==
In June 1280, Sancho, son of Alfonso X of Castile directed the incursion into the Vega de Granada accompanied by, amongst others, Gonzalo Ruiz Girón, Grand Master of the Order of Santiago. Sancho ordered Gonzalo to proceed along with his retainers, Gil Gómez de Villalobos, abbot of Valladolid, and Fernán Enríquez and protect the troops stockpiling supplies for the army with an expeditionary force whilst he stayed at Alcalá la Real and awaited reinforcements. Upon returning from the aforementioned expedition, the Castilian and Leonese forces were attacked by Muslim forces under the command of Muhammad II who had been waiting in ambush around the city of Moclín.

Feigning flight, the Muslim troops stationed in Moclín drew the Castilian-Leonese troops to the spot where they had set their ambush. The Christian troops pursued those of Muhammad II who proceeded to cut off their means of retreat. The Muslim forces then attacked, defeating the Christian forces and inflicting heavy casualties.

The slaughter, referred to as the Disaster of Moclín, resulted in the deaths of over 2,800 Castilian-Leonese knights and soldiers and the deaths of most of the knights in the service of the Order of Santiago. The order's Grand Master, Gonzalo Ruiz Girón was mortally wounded in the action. When the infante Sancho heard news of the disaster, he ordered that the remaining troops under his command hold their ground, a move that prevented an overall rout and slaughter of all the Christian troops on the campaign.

Once all the Christian troops had reorganized after the disaster, the infante Sancho passed through Moclín and proceeded into Granada to cut the valley in two. After a campaign of aggression throughout that area of Granada, Sancho returned to Córdoba via Jaén. The following Spanish language extract from Manuel González Jiménez' chronicle reveals that by August 7, the campaign had ended and Sancho had returned to Córdoba.

Sancho debió regresar a Córdoba en los primeros días de agosto, ya que consta su presencia en la ciudad el día 7 de este mes. En ese día prometió a la Orden de Calatrava entregarle Villa Real, con todos sus derechos, cuando fuese rey. (Sancho must have returned to Córdoba in the first days of August, as his presence in the city was recorded the 7th day of that month. On that day he promised the Order of Calatrava that he would bestow upon them Villa Real, with all its rights, when he became king.)

== Aftermath ==
Gonzalo Ruiz Girón, Grand Master of the Order of Santiago, died from his wounds a few days after the disaster. He was buried in a sepulcher in the city of Alcaudete.

To avoid the extinction of the Order of Santiago due to the deaths of so many of its knights, Alfonso X of Castile integrated the members of the Order of Santa María de España into that of Santiago and named Pedro Núñez as grand master of the newly integrated order. The Order of Santa María de España, which King Alfonso X had founded himself, ceased to exist.

== See also ==
- Order of Santa María de España
- Order of Santiago
- Alfonso X of Castile
- Sancho IV of Castile
- Reconquista
