= Moclín =

Coordinates: 37°20′N 3°47′W

- Flag Coat of arms

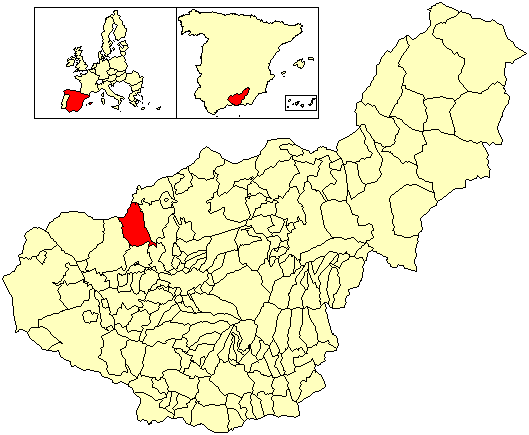

- Location in Spain.
- Country: Spain
- Autonomous community: Andalusia
- Province: Granada

Area
  - Total: 113.11 km^{2} (43.67 sq mi)
- Elevation: 1,045 m (3,428 ft)

Population (2025-01-01)
  - Total: 3,503
  - Density: 30.97/km^{2} (80.21/sq mi)
- Time zone: UTC+1 (CET)
  - Summer (DST): UTC+2 (CEST)
- Website: www.ayuntamiento democlin.com

Moclín is a municipality in the province of Granada, Spain. As of 2010, it has a population of 4237 inhabitants.

The Battle of Moclín took place here in 1280.

== See also ==
- List of municipalities in Granada
