= Alcaudete =

- city
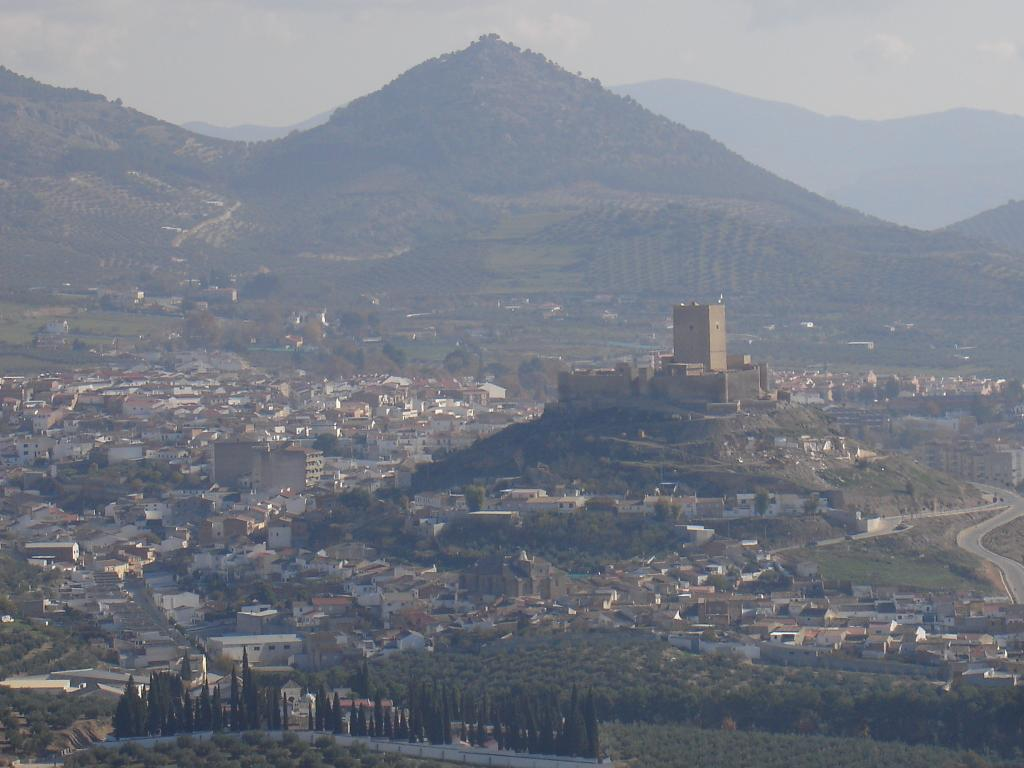

- Coat of arms

- Location in Spain.
- Coordinates: 37°35′N 4°06′W
- Country: Spain
- Province: Jaén
- Comarca: Sierra Sur de Jaén

Government
  - Mayor: Valeriano Martín Cano

Area
  - Total: 238 km^{2} (92 sq mi)
- Elevation: 676 m (2,218 ft)

Population (2025-01-01)
  - Total: 10,129
  - Density: 42.6/km^{2} (110/sq mi)
- Demonym: Alcaudetense
- Time zone: UTC+1 (CET)
  - Summer (DST): UTC+2 (CEST)
- Website: Official website

Alcaudete is a city located in the province of Jaén, Andalusia, Spain. As of 2018, it has a population of 10,558. It is home to a 12th-14th century Moorish castle, located on the top of the hill commanding the town. Other sights include the Iglesia de Santa María la Mayor (15th century).

The city was established on the site of the Roman settlement of Sosontigi, which was part of the Conventus Astigitanus. The town of Fravasoson was 3 to 5 miles away.

== Twin towns ==
- Manlleu, Spain
- Santa Margarida de Montbui, Spain

== Notable people ==
- Carmen Camacho (writer) (born 1976), writer of flash fiction and aphorisms

== See also ==
- List of municipalities in Jaén
