= Mellaria =

Ancient town in what is now Spain

Mellaria was a Roman settlement in Hispania Baetica, on the coast of the Strait of Gibraltar in what is now the Province of Cádiz in Spain. The fish processing plant is mentioned by Strabo (Geog. 3, 1) under the name Menlaria. There is some debate about its location; it has been identified with the modern town of Tarifa, but more probably with Valdevaqueros.

== Location ==
In the 18th century Ignacio Lopez de Ayala identified Mellaria with the town of Tarifa, where coins, foundations and other ancient relics had been found. This theory was discounted at the time since the town of Iulia Traducta was thought to have occupied the site of Tarifa. It has therefore been common to locate Mellaria in the west of the municipality of Tarifa, near Casas de Porro, where the Río del Valle enters the sea. Relics from the classical era have been found here, including ceramics and a cyst grave. However, the coast seems to have been fairly densely settled at that time, so these could well be remains of some other town.

In his Natural History, Pliny the Elder states that the narrowest part of the Strait was between the vicus of Mellaria and the Promunturium Album on the coast of Africa. This would clearly indicate that Mellaria was at the tip of Tarifa. According to Strabo, Menralia [sic] lay between Carteia and Belo. Pomponius Mela places Mellaria between Tingentera, another name for Iulia Traducta, and Baelo Claudia. He also said that Tingentera was in the same bay as Carteia, the Bay of Gibraltar. Ptolemy also located Mellaria between Traducta and Baelo. Assuming that Traducta Iulia was located in the Bay of Algeciras, it is therefore reasonable to identify Mellaria with Tarifa.

== History ==
Strabo says the town had an important factory for preserving salt fish. Mellaria was the birth place of the Latin writer Turiano Gracil. Plutarch records a naval battle off the coast of Mellaria in 80 BC in which Quintus Sertorius defeated to Gaius Aurelius Cotta at the start of his rebellion in Spain.
