= Facinas =

- Municipality
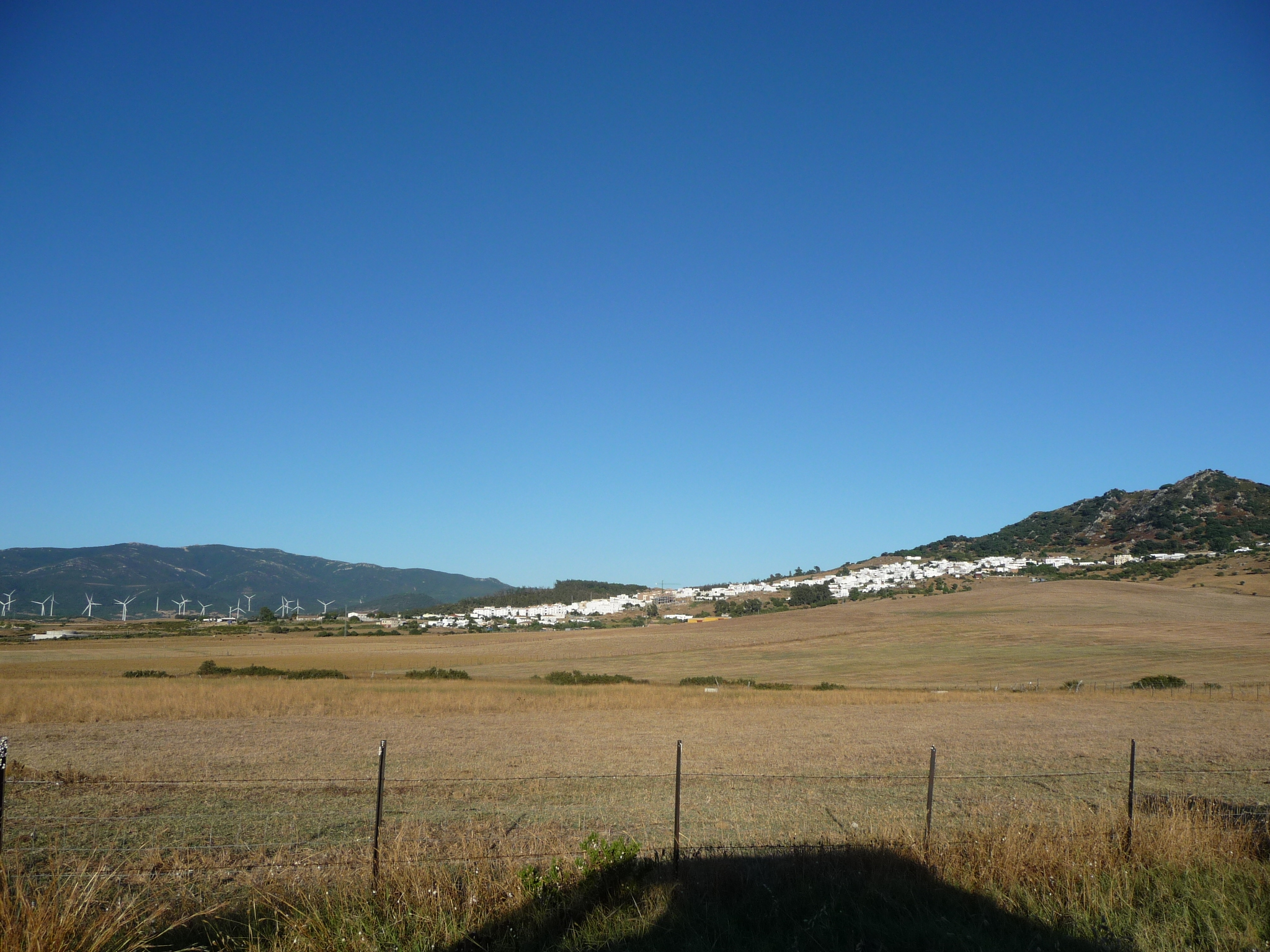

- Flag Coat of arms

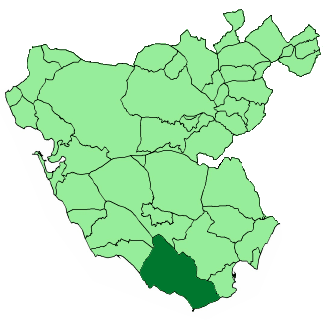
- Location in the province of Cádiz

- Location in Spain
- Coordinates: 36°08′26″N 5°41′56″W
- Country: Spain
- Autonomous community: Andalusia
- Province: Cádiz
- Comarca: Campo de Gibraltar
- Municipality: Tarifa

Population (2009)
  - Total: 1,307
- Demonym: Facinense
- Time zone: UTC+1 (CET)
  - Summer (DST): UTC+2 (CEST)
- Postal code: 11391
- Official language(s): Spanish
- Website: http://www.facinas.es

Facinas is a village in Tarifa in the province of Cádiz, Andalusia, Spain. It is located near the Los Alcornocales Natural Park. It is about fifteen kilometres from the coast with the beaches of Bolonia and Valdevaqueros as well as Zahara de los Atunes.

== Economy ==
The mainstream economic activities are forestry work, hospitality and construction. Facinas has essential public services, such as a health center, state school, police station, and sports and cultural facilities.

== Communications ==
Facinas is accessed by the N-340 through outlets located at kilometres 65 and 67 on this road. There are daily buses to Algeciras, La Linea de la Concepcion, Cádiz, Seville and Málaga.
