= Tarifa =

- Municipality
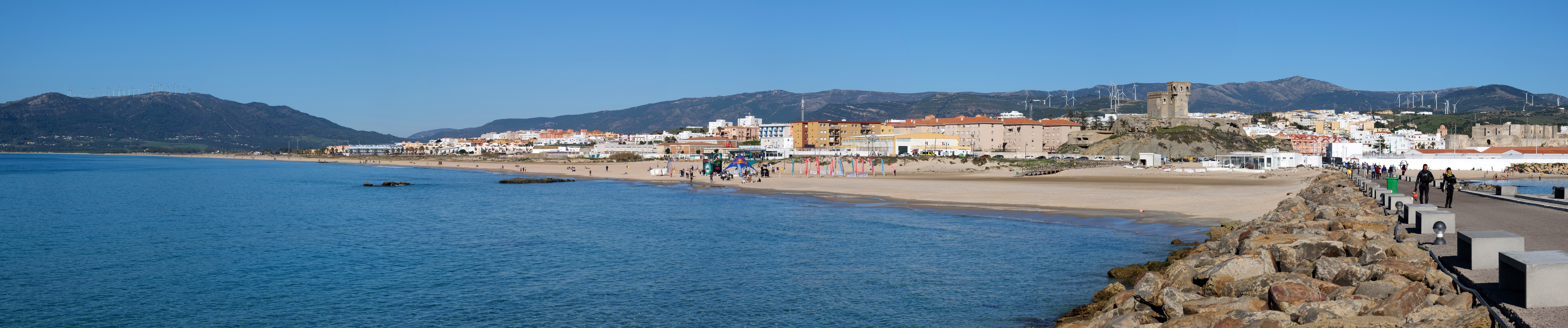

- Flag Coat of arms

- Location of Tarifa Tarifa (Province of Cádiz)
- Coordinates: 36.014°N 5.606°W
- Country: Spain
- Autonomous community: Andalusia
- Province: Cádiz
- Judicial district: Algeciras

Government
  - Mayor: Francisco Ruiz (PSOE)

Area
  - Total: 419.67 km^{2} (162.04 sq mi)
- Elevation: 7 m (23 ft)

Population (2025-01-01)
  - Total: 18,613
  - Density: 44.352/km^{2} (114.87/sq mi)
- Demonym: Tarifeños
- Time zone: UTC+1 (CET)
  - Summer (DST): UTC+2 (CEST)
- Postal code: 11380
- Dialing code: (+34) 956
- Official language(s): Spanish
- Website: Official website

Tarifa (Spanish pronunciation: [taˈɾifa]) is a Spanish municipality in the province of Cádiz, Andalusia. Located at the southernmost tip of the Iberian Peninsula, it is famous as one of the world's most popular destinations for windsports. Tarifa lies on the Costa de la Luz ('coast of light') and across the Strait of Gibraltar facing Morocco.

Besides the city proper, the municipality also comprises several villages, including Tahivilla, Facinas, and Bolonia.

== History ==
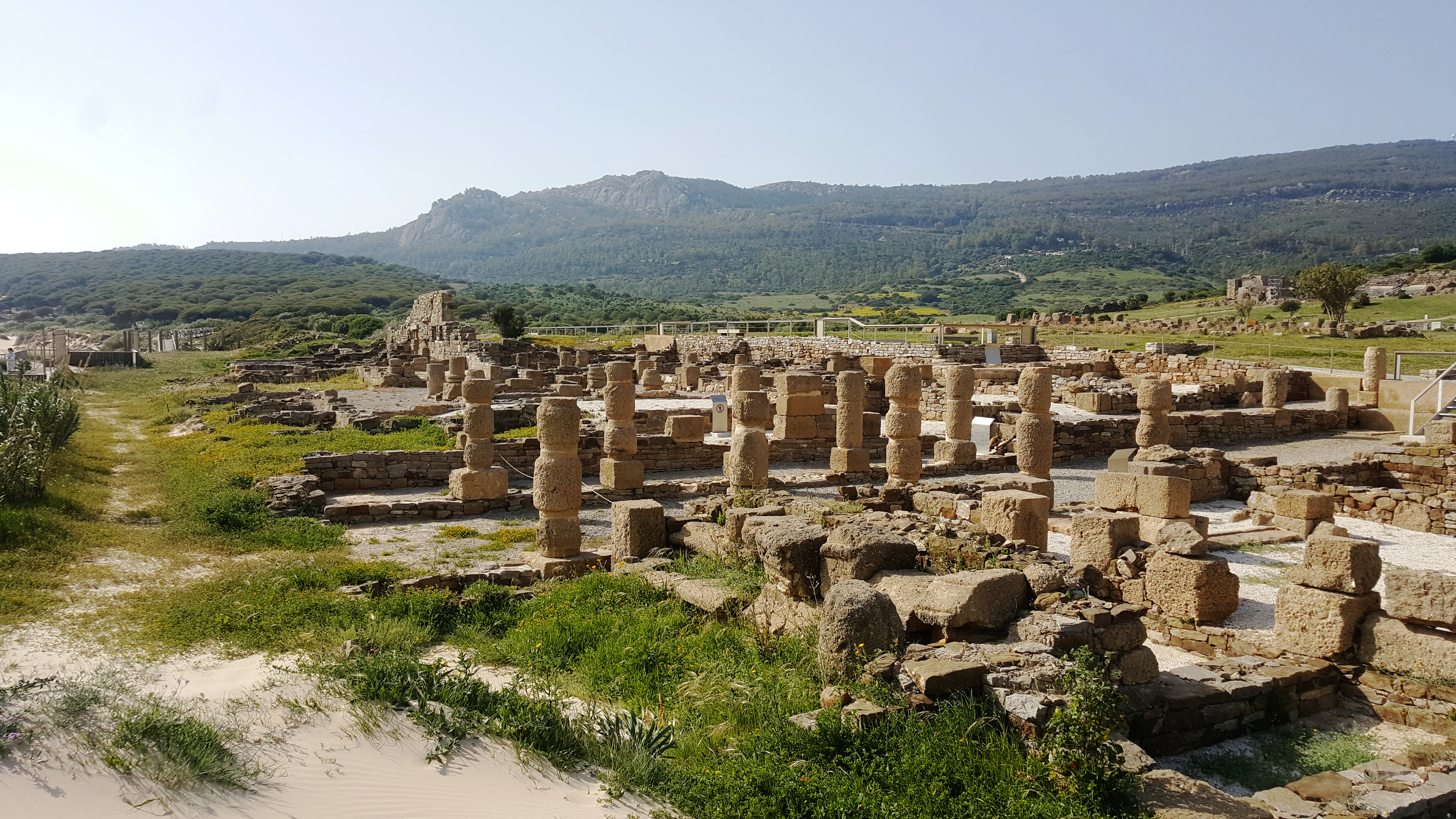
Ruins of Baelo Claudia near Bolonia Beach

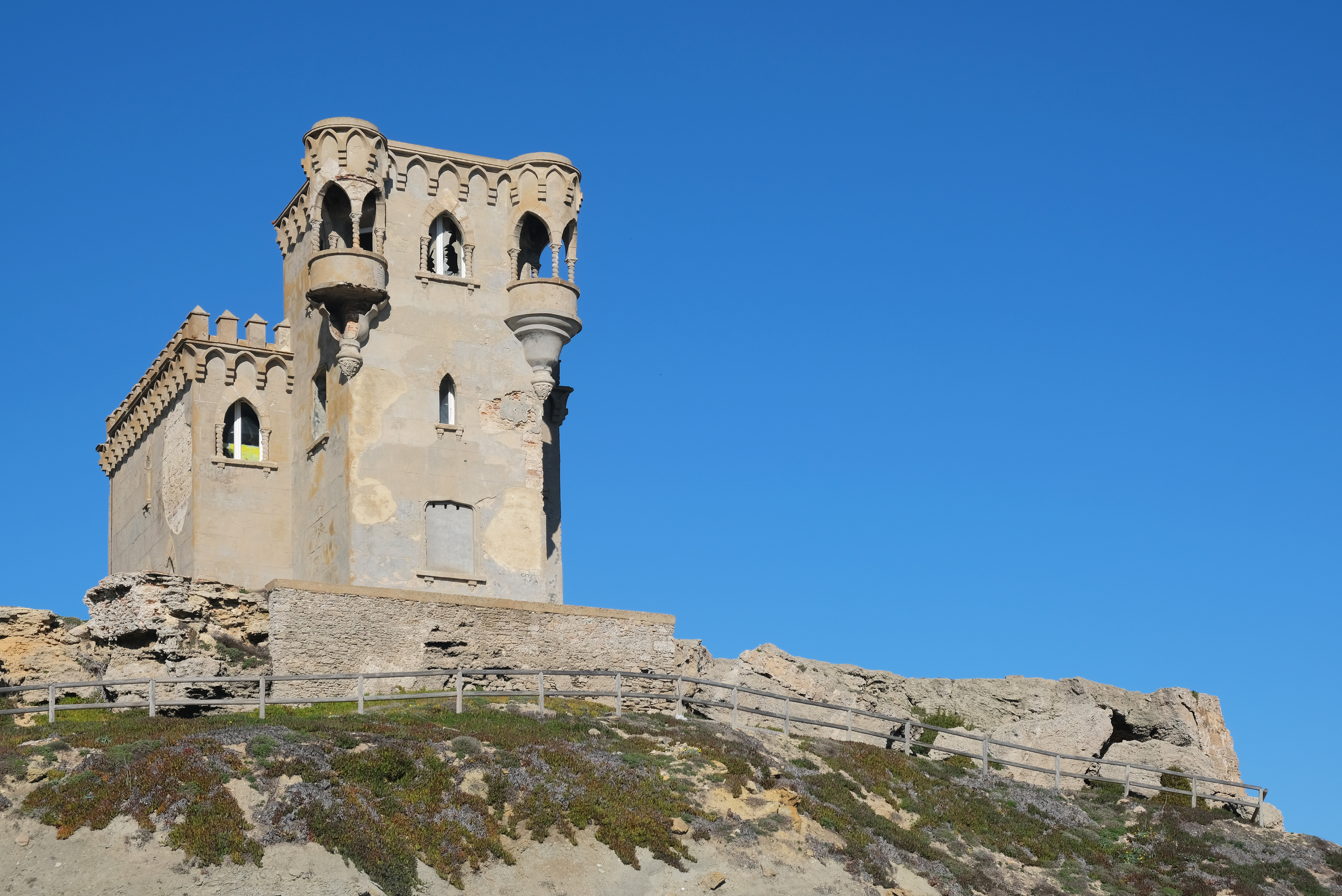
Castle of St Catalina

It was thought that Tarifa was once the site of the Roman settlement of Julia Transducta (also known as Julia Joza, or just Transducta). However, that settlement is now thought to have been where Algeciras now stands, while there is strong evidence that Casas de Porro, Valdevaqueros (Tarifa) was the site of the settlement of Mellaria. Tarifa was given its present name after the Islamic conquest of Tarif ibn Malik in 710, a military commander of Musa bin Nusayr. The village of Bolonia near Tarifa was also populated in Roman times (called Baelo Claudia). Roman ruins still exist near the village today.

After the Islamic conquest of southern Spain, the city was fortified starting from the 10th century. Later Tarifa was held by the taifa of Algeciras (1031) and by that of Seville (1057), and subsequently by the Almoravids. After the latter's fall, it lived a short period under another taifa of Algeciras (1231), until becoming part of the Kingdom of Granada. In 1292 it was conquered by Sancho IV of Castile, and two years later it resisted a siege by North African Islamic troops. The town resisted another siege in 1340 from Marinid, eventually leading to the Battle of Río Salado.

Despite its formidable defenses, Tarifa remained sparsely populated for the rest of the middle ages. The destruction of Algeciras after the 1369 Nasrid conquest turned Tarifa into the sole power base for the Castilian navy in the Strait area, and the influence of the Admiralcy of Castile increased thereafter. Tarifa enjoyed a great deal of privileges confirmed by the Castilian monarchs, while being simultaneously threatened by Muslim raids that resulted into frequent killings and kidnappings.

Owing to its largely military function after 1292, military activity weighted heavily in the place's social structure in the early 15th century. The town was donated to Fadrique Enríquez, Admiral of Castile, in 1447. The seigneuralization was fiercely opposed by the inhabitants. Occupied by Gonzalo de Saavedra, Tarifa returned to the nominal status of realengo, while largely controlled by the former. The mid-15th century saw the fostering of positive collaboration with the Portuguese across the strait.

After 1492, Tarifa lost part of its military value. Owing to its good pastures, husbandry played a notable role in the economy. It however lacked land dedicated to cereal crops. Already since the conquest and increasingly in the late middle ages, fishing activity provided riches to Tarifa, and an industry of the almadraba around tuna had developed in the early 16th century. In the early 16th century, the city became part of the seigneurial land of the Adelantado Mayor de Andalucía. Population increased in the 16th century, with around 3,500–4,000 inhabitants by 1587.

In 1514 it became the seat of a marquisate (Marquiss of Tarifa), including also Bornos, Espera and Alcalá de los Gazules.

In the course of the Peninsular War, Tarifa was besieged by French troops on 20 December 1810, and again on 18 December 1811. In both of these cases the town was defended by British troops from Gibraltar as the Spanish and British were allies against the French. During the 1811–12 Siege of Tarifa there were 3,000 defending troops with 1,200 of those British, including Colonel Charles Holloway who as commanding Royal Engineer made improvements to Tarifa's defences.

On 19 December the town was attacked again by General Laval, who bombarded the town over Christmas to the point where surrender was demanded on 30 December. Both the British and Spanish commanders refused to comply and their defiance was rewarded by rain that started the next day. By 5 January the attacking force realised that their powder was wet and their guns were bogged down in mud, and retreated.

== Name ==
The name "Tarifa" is derived from the name of the Umayyad Caliphate military commander, Tarif ibn Malik.

== Geography ==
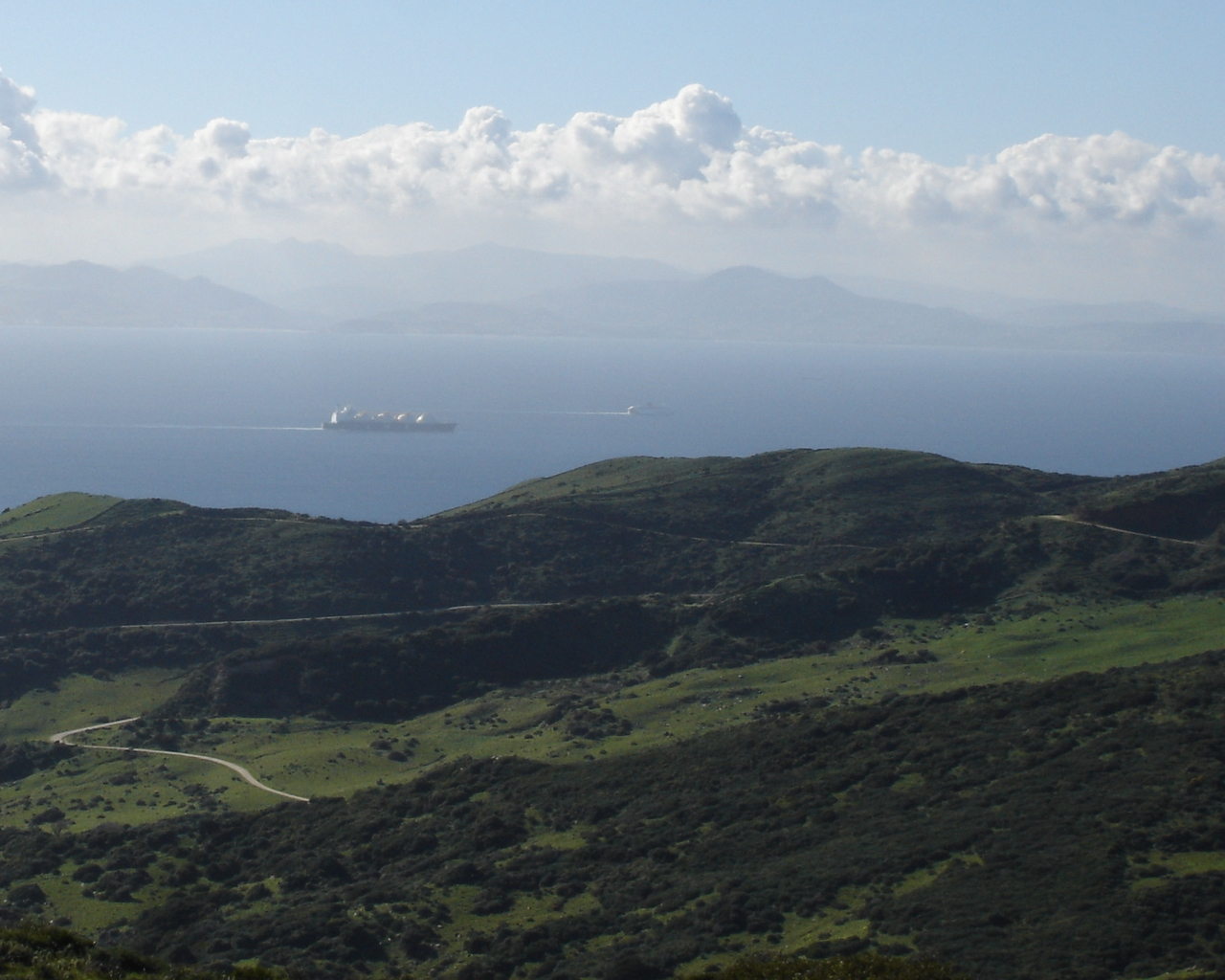
A view across the Strait of Gibraltar taken from the hills above Tarifa

=== Location ===
At exactly 36 degrees latitude, the Punta de Tarifa is the southernmost point of continental Europe. (The only parts of Europe farther south are islands - including the Greek island of Gavdos, which is the southernmost point of Europe.) The North African capitals of Algiers and Tunis actually lie farther north than Tarifa.

=== Climate ===
Tarifa features a hot-summer Mediterranean climate (Csa), bordering a warm-summer (Csb) Mediterranean climate according to the Köppen climate classification. The influence of the ocean creates a very small annual variation in temperatures. The average daily high in the hottest month, August, is only 9.3°C above the average lowest temperature during the month of January, and more than 10°C cooler than temperatures experienced further inland in the Guadalquivir valley. Thus Tarifa features a unique microclimate. Summers are strongly moderated by the cool waters of the Atlantic Ocean much more so than neighbouring cities along Spain's Mediterranean and Atlantic coast. Likewise, winters are some of the mildest in continental Europe. Rain falls primarily during the winter, with summer being largely dry as is the norm in this type of climate. Tarifa is located at the narrowest point of the Strait of Gibraltar, which greatly accelerates the prevailing winds from the east (Levante) and west (Poniente). Average wind speeds exceed 10 knots each month of the year.

Climate data for Tarifa (1981-2010), extremes (1945-)
| Month | Jan | Feb | Mar | Apr | May | Jun | Jul | Aug | Sep | Oct | Nov | Dec | Year |
|---|---|---|---|---|---|---|---|---|---|---|---|---|---|
| Record high °C (°F) | 23.6 (74.5) | 26.1 (79.0) | 30.4 (86.7) | 33.8 (92.8) | 38.2 (100.8) | 41.0 (105.8) | 42.3 (108.1) | 43.1 (109.6) | 39.5 (103.1) | 34.7 (94.5) | 28.9 (84.0) | 24.8 (76.6) | 43.1 (109.6) |
| Mean maximum °C (°F) | 18.4 (65.1) | 18.7 (65.7) | 21.0 (69.8) | 22.7 (72.9) | 25.2 (77.4) | 28.8 (83.8) | 30.8 (87.4) | 31.5 (88.7) | 28.5 (83.3) | 25.4 (77.7) | 21.7 (71.1) | 18.8 (65.8) | 31.5 (88.7) |
| Mean daily maximum °C (°F) | 15.2 (59.4) | 15.1 (59.2) | 16.3 (61.3) | 17.3 (63.1) | 19.4 (66.9) | 21.8 (71.2) | 23.9 (75.0) | 24.5 (76.1) | 23.1 (73.6) | 20.6 (69.1) | 17.9 (64.2) | 16.1 (61.0) | 19.3 (66.7) |
| Daily mean °C (°F) | 13.0 (55.4) | 13.0 (55.4) | 14.4 (57.9) | 15.2 (59.4) | 17.2 (63.0) | 19.8 (67.6) | 21.7 (71.1) | 22.3 (72.1) | 21.1 (70.0) | 18.6 (65.5) | 15.9 (60.6) | 14.1 (57.4) | 17.2 (63.0) |
| Mean daily minimum °C (°F) | 10.8 (51.4) | 10.9 (51.6) | 12.4 (54.3) | 13.0 (55.4) | 14.9 (58.8) | 17.8 (64.0) | 19.4 (66.9) | 20.0 (68.0) | 19.0 (66.2) | 16.7 (62.1) | 13.9 (57.0) | 12.1 (53.8) | 15.1 (59.2) |
| Mean minimum °C (°F) | 6.3 (43.3) | 7.4 (45.3) | 8.4 (47.1) | 10.1 (50.2) | 12.1 (53.8) | 15.7 (60.3) | 17.5 (63.5) | 18.2 (64.8) | 16.2 (61.2) | 13.1 (55.6) | 9.4 (48.9) | 5.98 (42.76) | 5.98 (42.76) |
| Record low °C (°F) | −3.3 (26.1) | −2.1 (28.2) | 1.2 (34.2) | 4.0 (39.2) | 7.4 (45.3) | 10.6 (51.1) | 11.9 (53.4) | 14.2 (57.6) | 5.0 (41.0) | 6.4 (43.5) | 2.4 (36.3) | 0.4 (32.7) | −3.3 (26.1) |
| Average precipitation mm (inches) | 70 (2.8) | 75 (3.0) | 48 (1.9) | 57 (2.2) | 28 (1.1) | 8 (0.3) | 2 (0.1) | 4 (0.2) | 16 (0.6) | 80 (3.1) | 86 (3.4) | 118 (4.6) | 592 (23.3) |
| Average snowfall cm (inches) | 0.01 (0.004) | 0.01 (0.002) | 0.01 (0.002) | 0.0 (0.0) | 0.0 (0.0) | 0.0 (0.0) | 0.0 (0.0) | 0.0 (0.0) | 0.0 (0.0) | 0.0 (0.0) | 0.00 (0.001) | 0.01 (0.003) | 0.04 (0.012) |
| Average precipitation days (≥ 1 mm) | 7 | 8 | 5 | 7 | 4 | 1 | 0 | 0 | 2 | 6 | 8 | 10 | 58 |
| Average snowy days | 0.03 | 0.01 | 0.0 | 0.0 | 0.0 | 0.0 | 0.0 | 0.0 | 0.0 | 0.0 | 0.003 | 0.002 | 0.045 |
| Average relative humidity (%) | 77 | 79 | 78 | 77 | 78 | 79 | 80 | 81 | 81 | 81 | 79 | 78 | 79 |
| Average dew point °C (°F) | 8.3 (46.9) | 8.7 (47.7) | 10.1 (50.2) | 11.7 (53.1) | 14.2 (57.6) | 16.7 (62.1) | 18.9 (66.0) | 19.4 (66.9) | 17.6 (63.7) | 15.0 (59.0) | 11.9 (53.4) | 9.5 (49.1) | 13.5 (56.3) |
| Mean monthly sunshine hours | 176.7 | 168.0 | 229.4 | 252.0 | 306.9 | 330.0 | 362.7 | 344.1 | 270.0 | 229.4 | 177.0 | 170.5 | 3,016.7 |
| Percentage possible sunshine | 56.4 | 54.5 | 61.7 | 63.6 | 69.7 | 74.8 | 81.2 | 82.2 | 73.2 | 66.7 | 57.8 | 56.1 | 66.5 |
| Average ultraviolet index | 3.4 | 4.7 | 6.5 | 8.1 | 9.3 | 10.2 | 10.8 | 10.5 | 8.9 | 6.8 | 4.9 | 3.6 | 7.3 |
Source 1: Agencia Estatal de Meteorología
Source 2: : • Windfinder • Weather2visit • Meteoblue • WeatherSpark • Open-Meteo

== Main sights ==
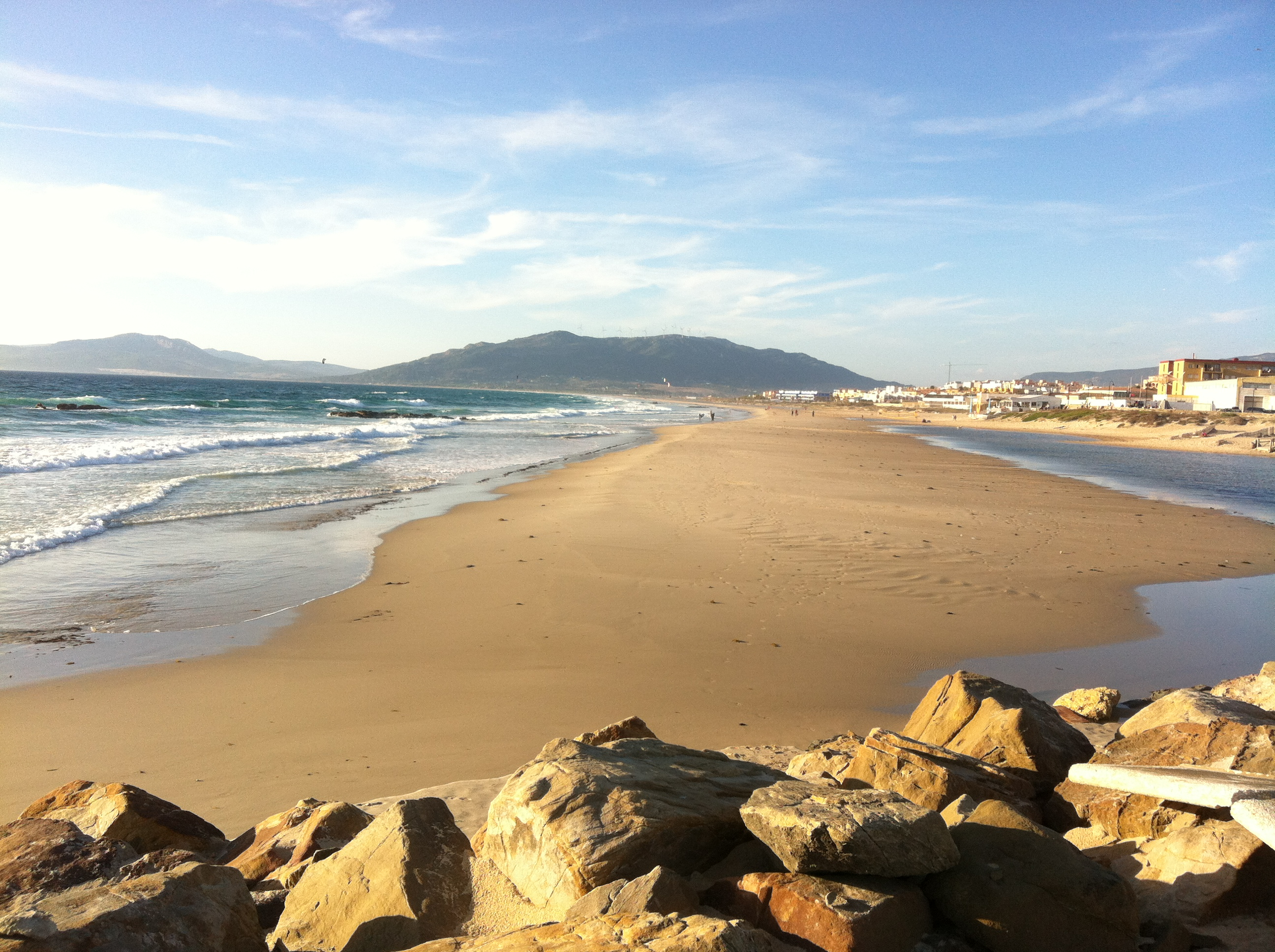
Los Lances Beach

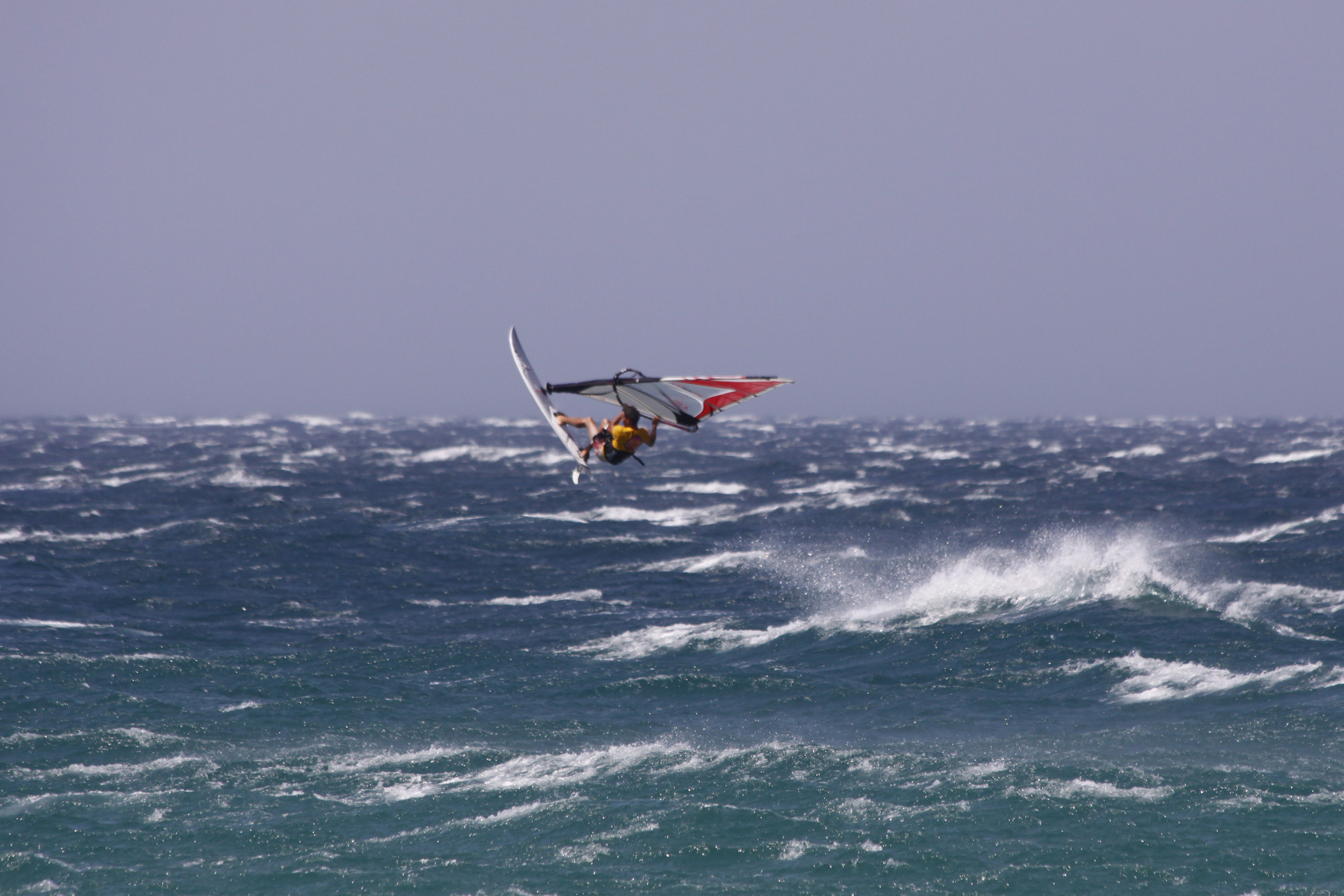
Windsurfing in Tarifa

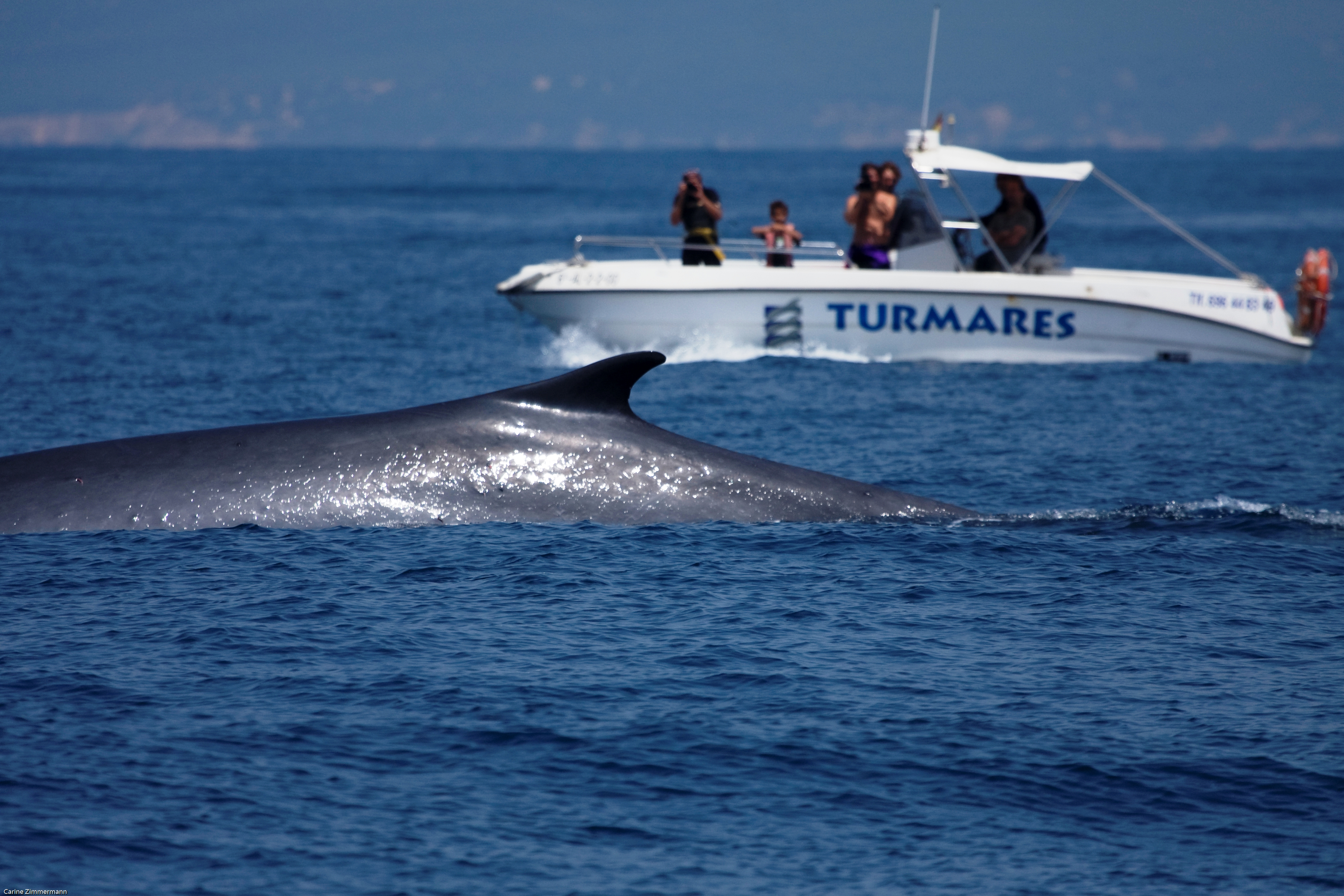
Watching fin whales off Tarifa

Historical landmarks of the city include:

- the well-preserved Guzmán castle, near the port, built by order of caliph Abd-ar-Rahman III (960). Annexed are the Guzmán el Bueno Tower (13th century) and the church of St. Mary, on the site of a former mosque.
- remains of the medieval walls. Of three gates once existing, today only the Puerta de Jerez (13th century) has survived.
- Church of St. Matthew, built in the early 16th century in Gothic style, also over a former mosque. The façade was redesigned by Torcuato Cayón de la Vega in 1774.
- The ruins of the Roman city of Baelo Claudia, located nearby.
- Tarifa has become a popular spot for northern Europeans to spend their summers.
- Tarifa's unique wind conditions have made the beaches at Playa de Los Lances, Valdevaqueros and Punta Paloma the most popular in Europe with windsurfers and kitesurfers. The funnel created by the Strait of Gibraltar creates a Venturi effect when either the Levante (Easterly wind from Africa) or Poniente (Westerly wind from the Atlantic) is blowing. These two winds prevail in Tarifa for over 300 days most years, meaning Tarifa experiences exceptionally strong and consistent winds throughout the year. In addition, localised thermal winds at locations such as Valdevaqueros mean that even when the prevailing wind is not strong it is often possible to windsurf and kite surf in Tarifa. These unique wind conditions are also the reason Tarifa is dotted with countless wind turbines.
- La Isla, a small island that is connected to the mainland by a 30m long bridge. This island and its connecting bridge are considered the official divide between the Atlantic and Mediterranean coasts of Andalusia.

Tarifa is located within the Intercontinental Mediterranean Biosphere Reserve, a renowned place to watch migrating birds, in particular the storks which cross the Straits of Gibraltar in spring and autumn. Also whale and dolphin watching can be done as there are several species living on the 14 kilometre-wide Straits, for instance the common dolphin, Pilot whale, sperm whale and orca.

== Cinema ==
Tarifa is renowned for its African Film Festival, whose first edition took place in 2004.

== Books ==
Tarifa is popular for its placement in The Alchemist.

Tarifa is a location for a visit in Laurie Lee's A Rose for Winter.

== Transportation ==
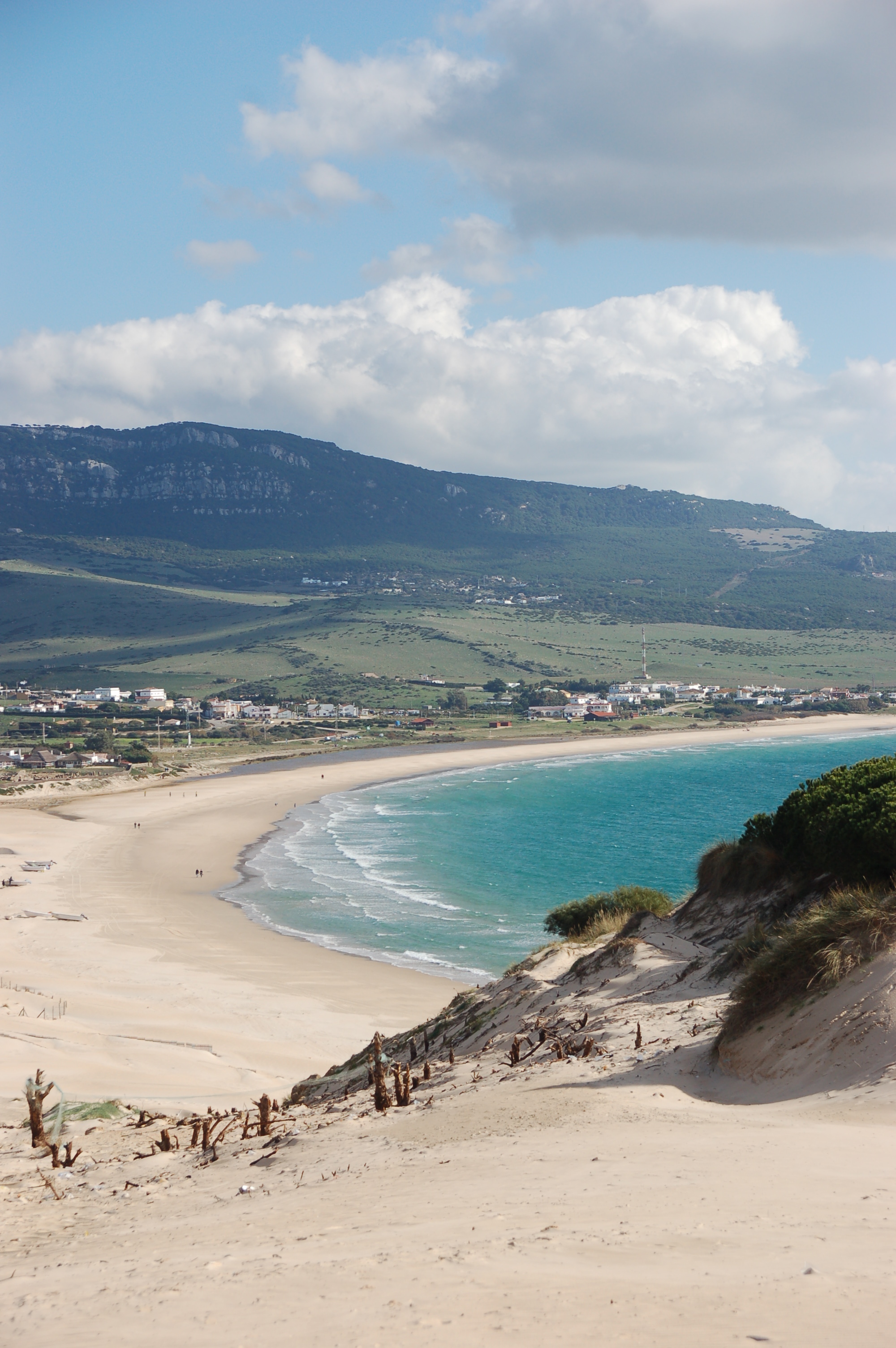
Bolonia Beach

There are regular ferry services connecting Tarifa with Tangier (40 minutes) and Ceuta (1 hour) from the ferry port.

Bus services run from the bus station on Calle Batalla de Salado. There are regular services between Tarifa and Algeciras, about 20 km to the northeast, and Seville about 200 km to the north. Direct buses also run to Málaga and Cádiz. In high summer a special kitesurfing bus runs along the A7 between Tarifa bus station and Camping Jardin de las Dunas, stopping at popular hotels and campsites along the route.

There is a taxi rank on the Avenida Andalucía. It is about 5 minutes walk from the bus station and is located just outside the Puerto de Jerez (the main entrance to the old town) at the junction of Avenida Andalucía and Calle Batalla de Salado.

== Surroundings ==
The intentional community "Molino de Guadalmesi", which is part of the Global Ecovillage Network (GEN), is located about 13 km north-east from Tarifa.

== In literature ==
- The city of Tarifa is depicted in the 1986 worldwide bestseller fiction novel, The Alchemist, by Paulo Coelho. The lead protagonist, a shepherd boy, visits the city to meet an interpreter of dreams and ask her to interpret a recurrent dream he has had twice. His life takes a dramatic turn when he meets an old king of Salem named Melchizedek at a city marketplace.
- The city of Tarifa is depicted in the first chapter of Laurie Lee's 1955 novel, A Rose For Winter.

== See also ==
- Dictionary of Greek and Roman Geography
- List of municipalities in Cádiz
