= Tingentera =

Tingentera may refer to:

- Tingentera, the name given by Walker, 1864 to Tisis, a genus of small moth in the family Lecithoceridae
- Tingentera a Roman settlement in southern Spain, probably the same as Iulia Traducta
