= Bolonia =

Bolonia may refer to:

- Bologna, a city in Italy
- Bolonia, Spain, a small town in Andalusia
