= Siege of Algeciras (1369) =

1369 battle in Spain

Coordinates: 36.1275°N 5.453889°W

- Part of the Reconquista
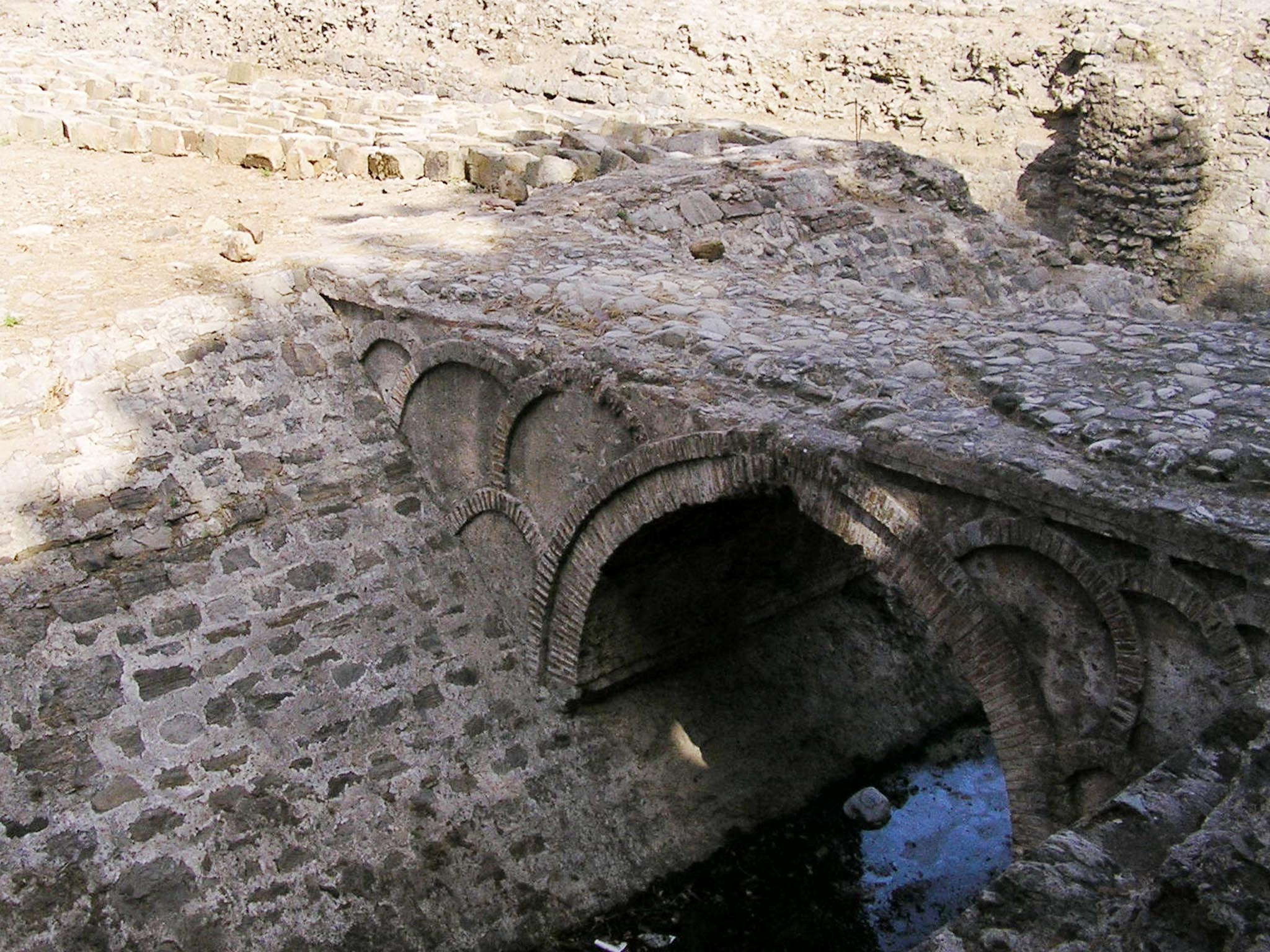
- Bridge of access to Al-Yazirat Al-Hadra
Date	28 July 1369 – 30 July 1369
Location	Algeciras
Result	Granadan victory
Territorial changes	Reconquest of the city by Granada

Belligerents
Emirate of Granada	Kingdom of Castile

Commanders and leaders
Muhammad V	Henry II
- Location in Spain

The siege of Algeciras (1369) was undertaken during the period of the Reconquest of Spain by Muhammad V, the Emir of Granada to reclaim the city of Al-Hadra Al-Yazirat, called Algeciras by the Christians, in the Kingdom of Castile. The siege lasted just three days, and the sultan was victorious. The Muslims thus regained a major city which had been in Castilian hands since Alfonso XI of Castile took it from the Moroccans after the long 1342–1344 siege. Ten years after the capture of the city, in 1379 the sultan of Granada decided to completely destroy the city to prevent it falling into Christian hands. It was impossible to defend the place at a time when the Muslim kings of the Iberian Peninsula had lost much of military power they enjoyed in earlier centuries.

== Background ==
Granada – territory gained by Castile or Portugal between 1292 and 1462

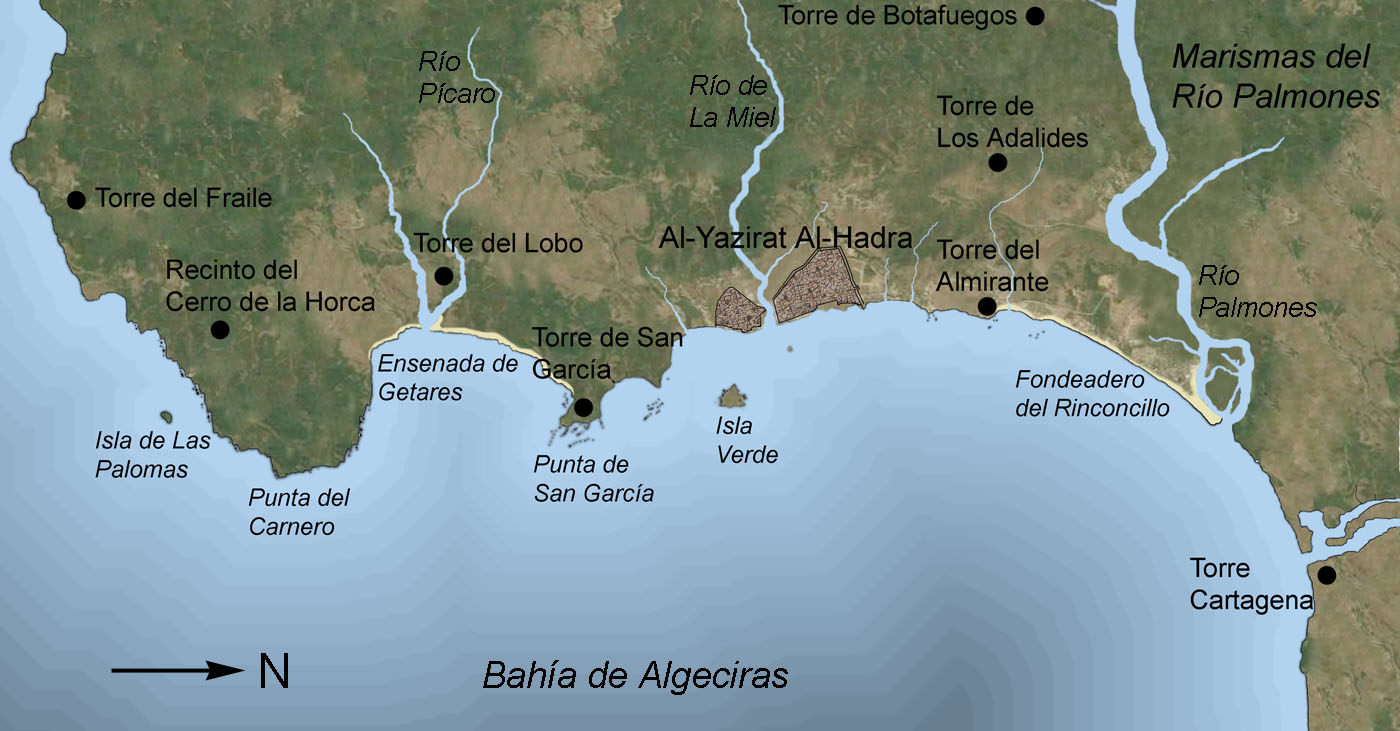
Region around Al-Hadra Al-Yazirat. North is to the right of this map.

The city of Al-Hadra Al-Yazirat was the first city founded by the Muslims under Tariq ibn Ziyad in the Iberian Peninsula on the ruins of the Roman city of Iulia Traducta. During the thirteenth and fourteenth centuries it had been held by the rulers of Granada and of Morocco. It was conquered by Alfonso XI of Castile in the siege of Algeciras (1342–1344). Castilian control of the city of Algeciras was important in giving control of the Strait of Gibraltar to the Christian kingdoms.

However, the death of Alfonso XI during the siege of Gibraltar in 1350 resulted in a civil war between the two successors to the throne of Castile, Peter and Henry II of Castile. Muhammad V of Granada had embarked on a policy of friendship with Castile, supporting Peter as the legitimate heir to the throne. Relations with Aragon however were not as friendly, and the Aragonese supported the proclamation of Muhammad VI as ruler of Granada between 1359 and 1362.

The return of Muhammad V in 1362 and his support of Peter caused closer relations between Aragon and Henry. The end of the Spanish civil war after Peter died in 1369 convinced the Granadans of the need to secure their borders with Castile and regain control of the Strait of Gibraltar. The Moorish king now engaged with the king of Portugal, Fernando I, against Henry, who he felt was the usurper of the throne of Castile. Muhammad V would attack Algeciras while the Portuguese would attack various sites in Galicia.

== Siege ==
On 28 July 1369 Muhammad V appeared with a large army at the gates of the city of Algeciras. The siege was established by erecting siege towers and deploying his soldiers around the perimeter of the city. Algeciras at this time consisted of two separate towns separated by the Río de la Miel. Each town had its own walls with strong towers and gateways. After the previous siege many of the city walls had been destroyed or severely weakened, so the Spaniards had to strengthen various sections.

The rushed rebuilding left much to be desired compared to the original fabric of the thirteenth century Moorish defenses. Thus the main gate of the city, the Puerta del Fonsario, which had suffered most of the attacks by trebuchets during the siege of Alfonso XI, was rebuilt in part with a weak wall of mortar. The combination of decreased physical defenses and a small garrison for the town after movement of troops to the north caused the Muslim siege to be devastating for the city.

The attacks focused at first on the Villa Nueva, the southern of the two towns. The soldiers of Muhammad V mounted numerous siege engines, used high ladders to scale the walls and assaulted the city. There were few defenders within the town and Villa Nueva, called al-Binya by the Moors, fell on 30 July. All its inhabitants were slaughtered.

== Capitulation ==
The terror caused by the fall of the southern town and the conviction that no reinforcements would arrive from Castile forced the decision to deliver the besieged city before suffering more casualties. The mayor of the Villa Vieja, Alonso Fernández Portocarrero, third Lord of Moguer, asked the king of Granada to grant safe conduct to the inhabitants to leave the city with their most valuable possessions. After just three days of siege in which the Nazarites siege weapons were used more as a threat than a real attempt to open a breach, the Spanish defenders of Algeciras surrendered their weapons.

On 31 July Muhammad V's troops entered the Villa Vieja of the city, letting its occupants leave with the belongings they could carry. The Cathedral of Algeciras, the former Mosque, was returned to Islamic worship, and the king of Granada occupied the ancient fortress located in the Cerro de Matagorda. The impact on morale of the people of Granada of the reconquest of Al-Hadra Al-Yazirat is evidenced in the many chronicles made in Granada praising the king's military operation.

== Nasrid control ==
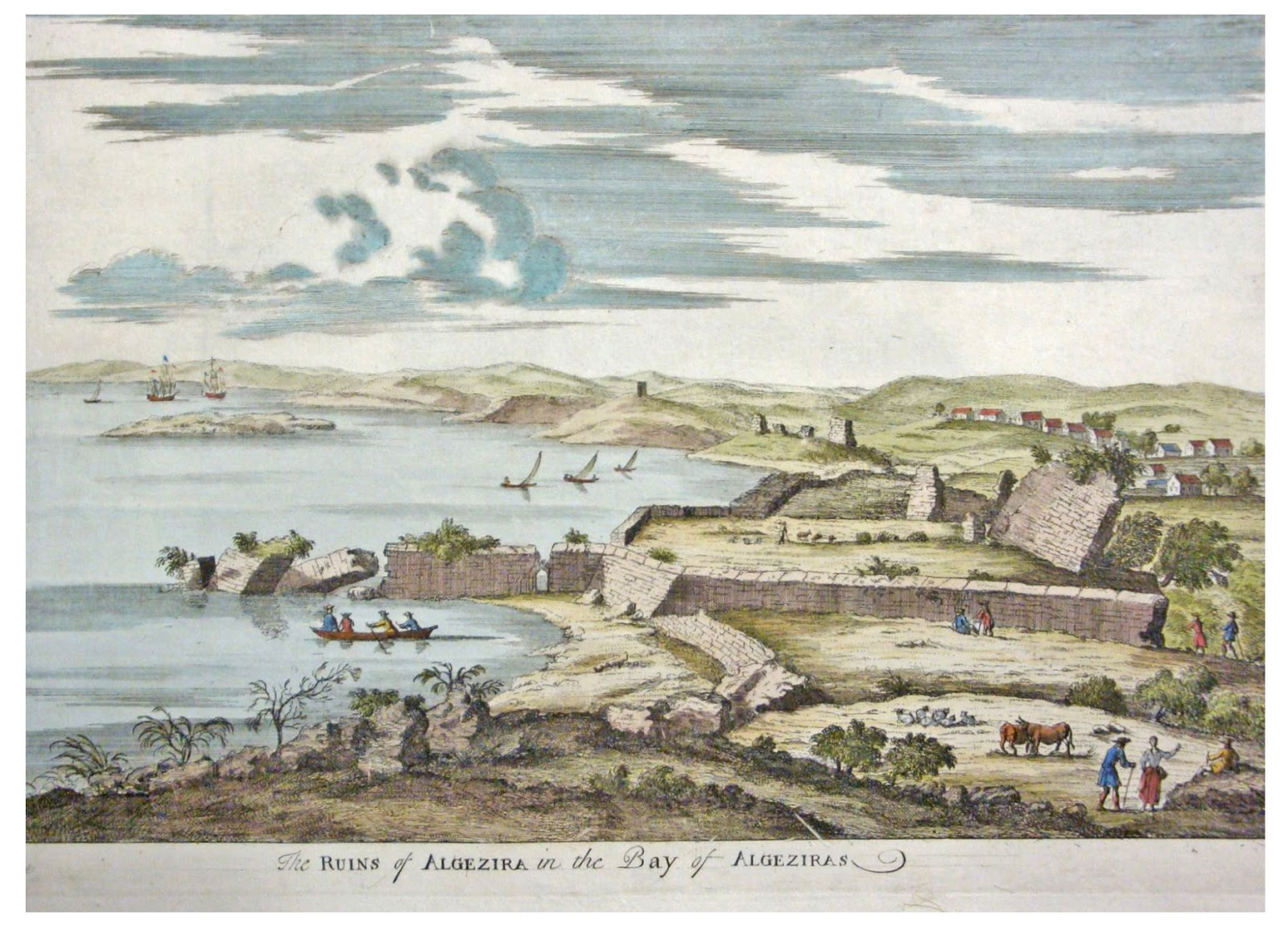
Ruins of Algeciras in an 18th-century illustration

After the capture of the city, Muhammad V rebuilt the defenses and installed a garrison. For ten years the city remained in the hands of Granada, but without achieving the importance it had in the past. The Kingdom of Granada was no longer an important military or economic power in the peninsula, so the main value of Algeciras as a port for entry of North African troops and trade was diminished. No notable events happened in connection with the city, which almost disappeared from written sources.

In 1379 Henry II of Castile died and was succeeded by his son Juan I. The Christian kingdoms prepared for a new phase of the reconquest. In these circumstances, the Moorish kingdom considered consolidating its border with Castille. In the Bay of Algeciras there were two port cities, Algeciras and Gibraltar. Despite the strength of Algeciras, Gibraltar was easier to defend because of the natural defenses. Algeciras on the other hand had more than 5,000 metres (16,000 ft) of walls, needing many more soldiers for defense.

== Destruction of the city ==
The choice was clear. The city of Al-Yazirat had to be abandoned so Granada could concentrate future defensive efforts on nearby Gibraltar. Abandonment of the city should be accompanied by the destruction of its fortifications to make them unusable if it were reoccupied by Castile. Walls were dismantled, the port was blocked and the main buildings of Algeciras destroyed, including the palace and the fortress. The houses of the city were burned. The city remained in ruins until 1704, when the capture of Gibraltar by the British forced the original population of that city to take refuge in the ruins of the old Algeciras.
