= Playa de Los Lances =

Beach in Tarifa, Spain

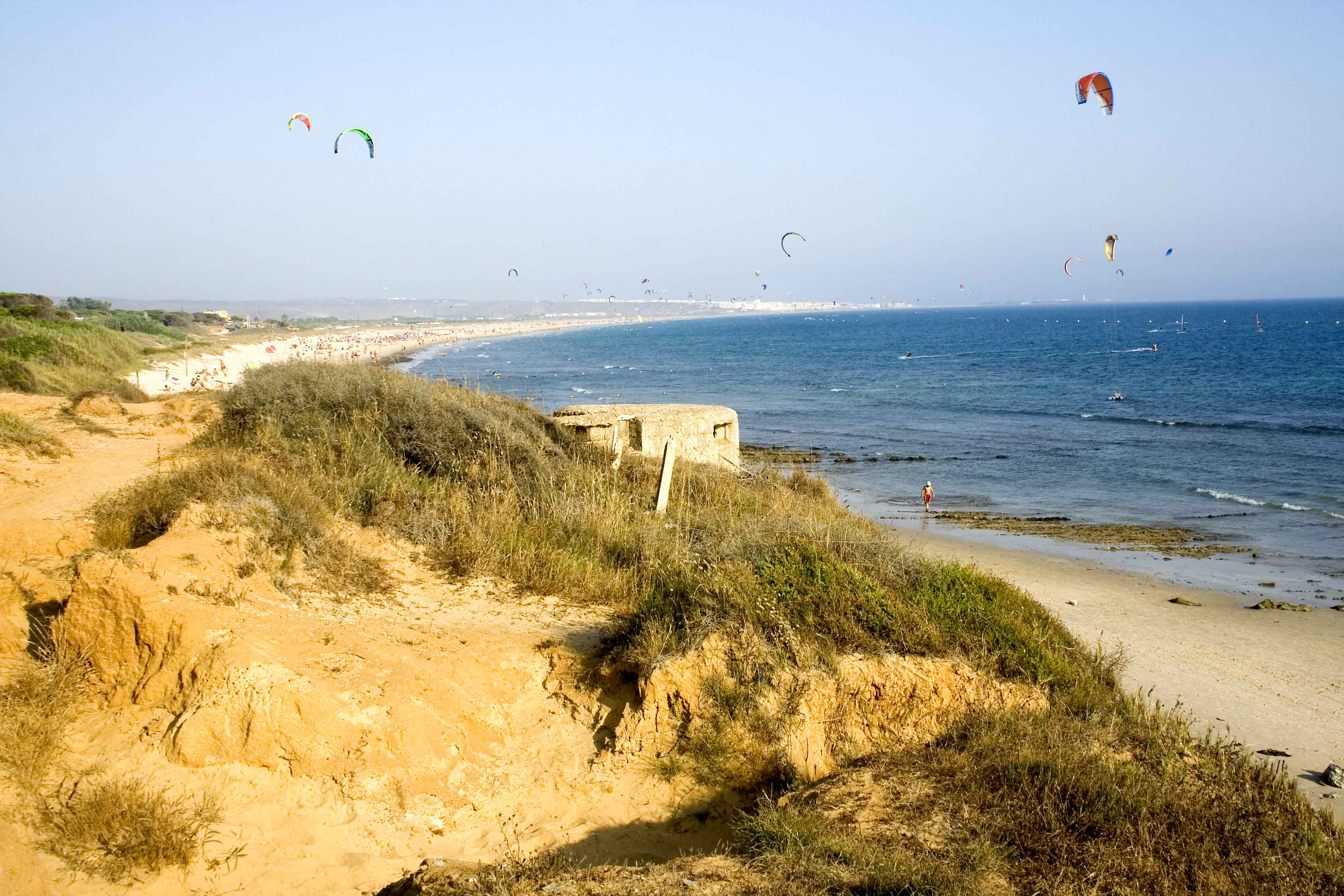
- Playa de Los Lances, Tarifa

- Location within Andalusia
- Coordinates: 36.035496°N 5.629463°W
- Max. length: 7,250 metres (23,790 ft)
- Max. width: 120 metres (390 ft)
- Settlements: Tarifa

The playa de Los Lances (English: Beach of Los Lances) is a beach that forms one side of the town of Tarifa, in the region of Campo de Gibraltar in Andalusia, Spain.

The beach is 7,250 metres (23,790 ft) long from Punta de la Peña to Punta de Tarifa, with an average width of 120 metres (390 ft). It is usually differentiated into two zones: North Los Lances, an undeveloped beach away from main population center, and South Los Lances, very close to the town of Tarifa and with extensive human occupation. The Río Jara separates the two areas of the beach. Los Lances' location on the Atlantic side of the Strait of Gibraltar creates unique wind conditions which have made it Europe's foremost destination for kitesurfing. The beach is also a favorite for windsurfing and similar sports, and has ample facilities for participants in these sports.

== Description ==
The natural beach environment has been much degraded by human activity, despite being protected inside the Natural Park of the Los Lances beach, which is part of the Natural Park of the Strait (Parque Natural del Estrecho). The beach has less natural beauty than others in the area. The dune system is quite degraded by the continuous movement of people, and parking uses much of the secondary dunes. In the northern part, the dunes are separated from the road by a line of pine trees planted to prevent the encroachment of the sand onto the road. This barrier has led, however, to a steady deterioration in the system by reducing the capacity of the dunes to expand. The southern area is in even worse condition. The many urban developments and the discharges of these into nearby streams has caused the disappearance of numerous species and loss of dune dynamics.

The Battle of Río Salado, also known as the Battle of Tarifa (30 October 1340), took place near the beach and resulted in a decisive victory of the armies of King Afonso IV of Portugal and King Alfonso XI of Castile against those of the Marinid sultan Abu al-Hasan Ali ibn Othman of Morocco and the Nasrid sultan Yusuf I of Granada.
