= Iulia Traducta =

Roman city in Andalusia, Spain

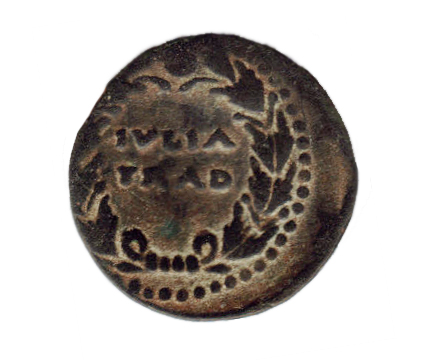
Coin from Iulia Traducta showing civic crown motif very popular during the first century AD

Iulia Traducta was a Roman city in Andalusia, Spain, on the site of the modern Algeciras.

== Identification ==
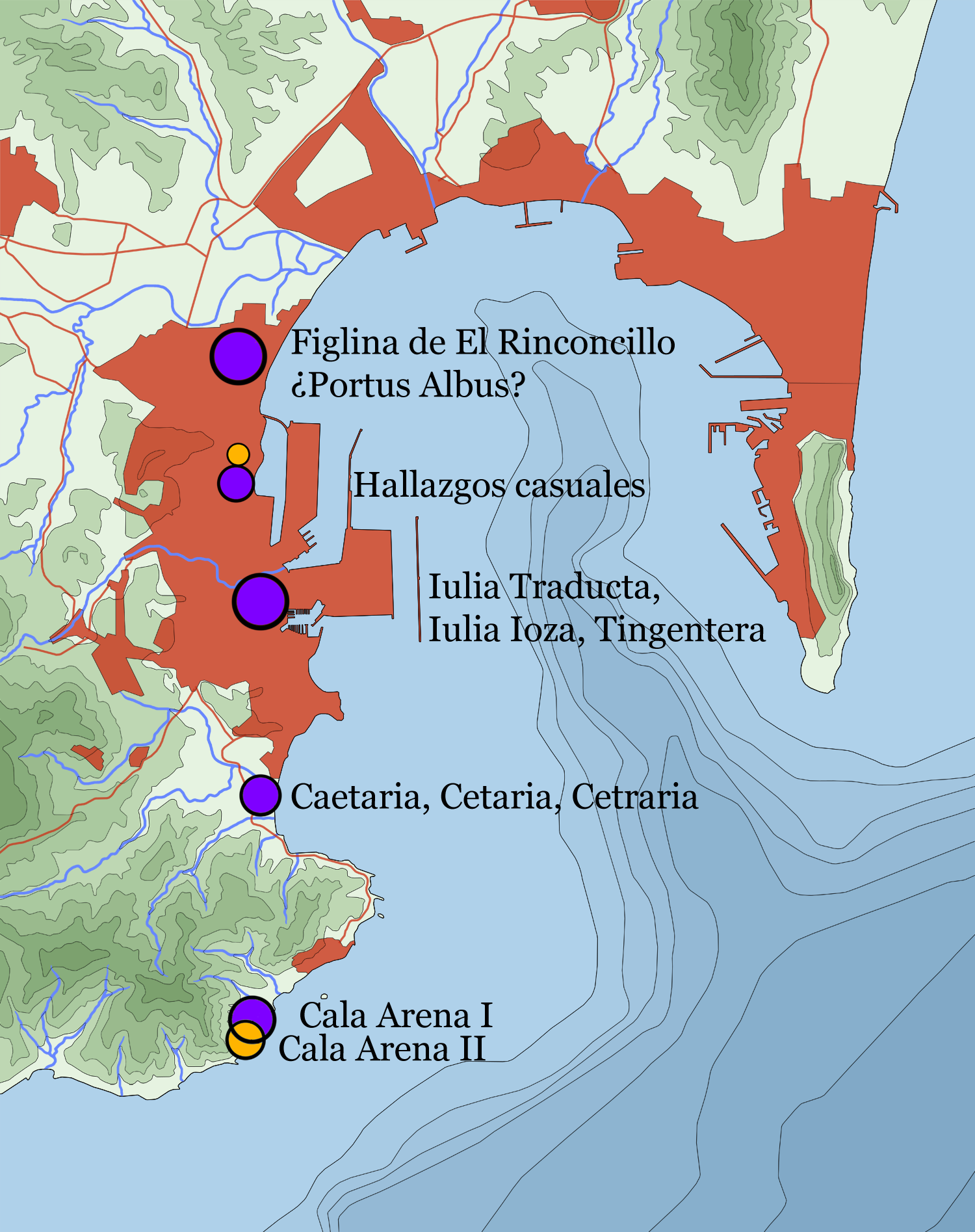
Location of Iulia Traducta and neighboring places

The location of the city of Iulia Traducta has been widely debated by historians. The traditional hypothesis identified the city of Iulia Traducta with the town of Tarifa, or a location within that municipality. According to Pliny the Elder, the town was in Mauretania, on the African coast. Strabo, calling it Iulia Ioza, says it was on the Mediterranean coast of Hispania Baetica. Some historians have even identified Iulia Traducta with the town of Baelo Claudia in Baetica.

However, the latest research and the discovery of several important archaeological sites in the neighboring city of Algeciras have caused investigators to reconsider the matter. One of the most important sources for determining the location of various cities of Hispania was the Antonine Itinerary, a description of the Roman municipalities along the various roads of the time. This document does not name the city of Iulia Traducta in the Bay of Gibraltar, but in the place that it should occupy, halfway between Carteia and Mellaria, it places Portus Albus. The Ravenna Cosmography places the mansion of Transducta between Gartegia (Carteia) and Cetraria (Caetaria), identified as being respectively in the north and south of Algeciras Bay, but does not name Portus Albus. The hypothesis most widely accepted today is that Portus Albus stood within the present town of Algeciras, north of the city of Iulia Traducta in the old town. However, we must not dismiss the possibility that Portus Albus was a vernacular name of the city, or the name given to its port.

== Foundation ==
The city is named by classical sources such as Pliny the Elder, Marcian of Heraclea and Pomponius Mela. However, Pliny in an obscure or inaccurate passage, places the city in Mauritania. According to Strabo, between 33 and 25 BC part of the population of the North African city of Colonia Iulia Constantia Zilitanorum (Zilis) was moved to the Iberian peninsula and settled at Iulia Traducta. (Note: The name "Iulia Traducta" ("transferred Iulia"), refers to the fact that part of the population had been moved from Iulia Constantia Zilitanorum. Another name for the new town was Ioza, meaning "getting out" in the Punic language.) Strabo also notes that some people were moved from Tingi (modern Tangier), so the town was also called Tingentera, a contraction of Tingis Altera, or "the other Tangier". The historian Pomponius Mela was born in Tingentera, which he said was founded after the transfer of the populations of Zilis and Tingis to the peninsula. Coins issued in Tingis have the inscription Tingis Maior ("Greater Tingis"), suggesting the existence of a Tingis Minor or Tingis Altera.

According to modern historians, the foundation of the city was an attempt by the emperor Octavian to create a strong city of his supporters in an area of Betica (Andalusia) that had overwhelmingly supported Pompey during the Civil War. For this purpose, he moved the population of Zilis to the peninsula. Iulia Traducta was inhabited by veterans as well as by the people from Zilis.

== Economy ==
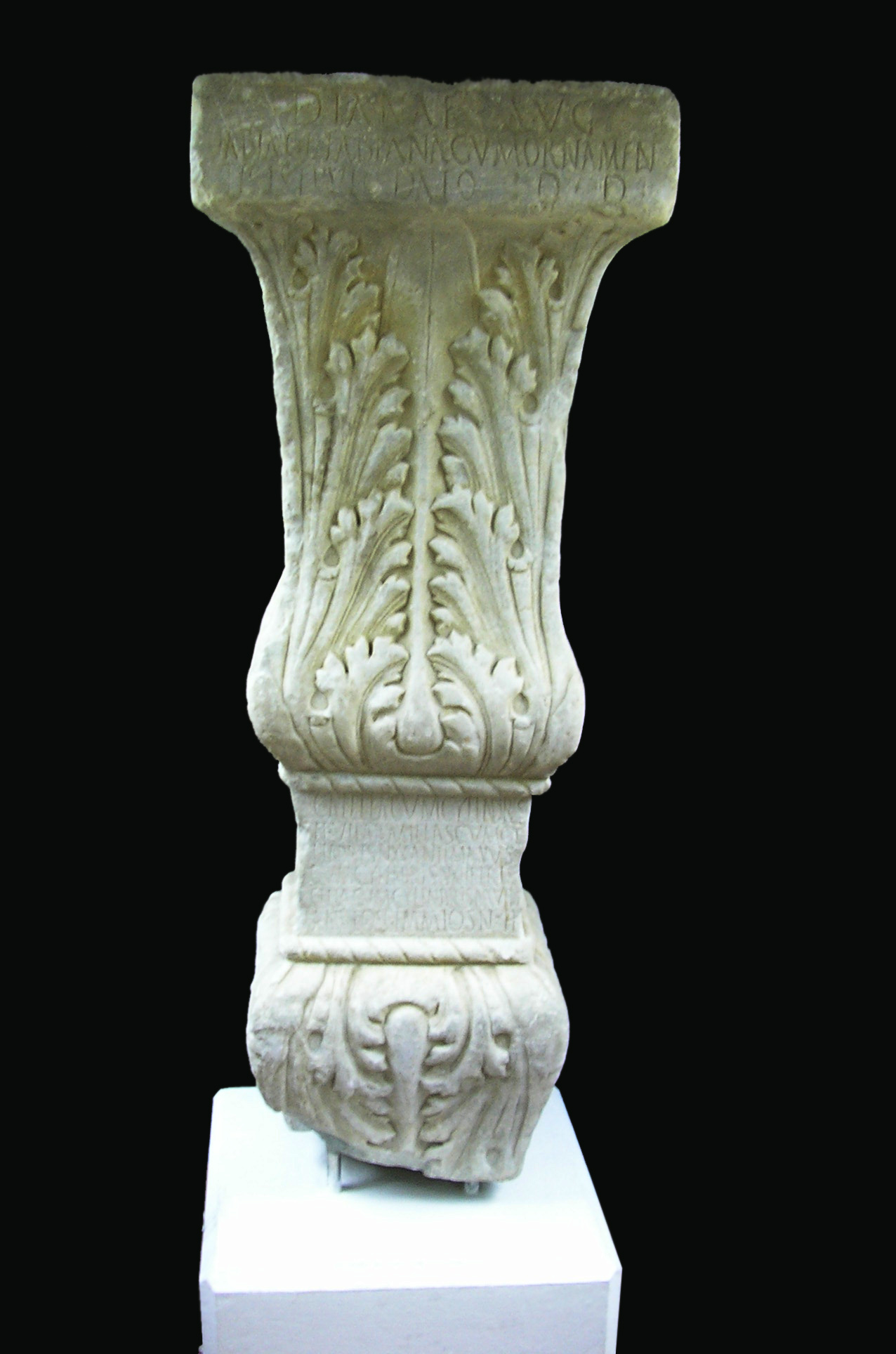
Pedestal dedicated to the Goddess Diana located in the Villa Nueva of Algeciras, dated to the first century

The city's economy included fishing and preparing salt fish, as shown by the industrial complex located in today's San Nicolas street of the Villa Vieja (Old Town) of Algeciras. It dates from the first century until probably the late fifth or early sixth centuries. Many millstones were found in five fish-processing factories, and many traces of fish, but very few bones. This suggests that the factories were involved in grinding down the bones to manufacture flours of fish. The salting factory stretched across much of the Villa Vieja, from San Nicolas street probably to the south of the Hotel Reina Cristina. The remains of the salting vats have been located at the foot of the medieval towers of the Villa Vieja, confirming the extent of the complex.

In the first century BC, Iulia Traducta had a mint which has left abundant coins (dupondios, asses, semisses and quadrants), clearly showing the importance of the fishing and industry of the town, issued between the years 12 and 10 BC. Creation of this mint was part of the propaganda drive by Octavius to show the divine character of the emperor. The coins minted in the city showed the image of the emperor, his sons Gaius and Lucius, and the priestly attributes of princeps of Rome. It also showed symbols related to the economy of the city, such as tuna.

It is possible that part of the population also undertook the manufacture of wine, since many amphorae intended for this purpose have been found. The production of amphora in Traducta Iulia has been considered minor due to the existence of a major complex for manufacturing amphorae in the neighboring city of Portus Albus, but there were potteries in Traducta, judging by some findings around the beach of Chorruelo next to the factories and nearby lands south of the factories. These kilns for making the amphorae have been dated to the first century AD. They may have replaced kilns located in Portus Albus that had been abandoned at that time. From this it would seem that there was an increase in the economic importance of the city at the expense of nearby Carteia, whose amphorae production depended on the manufactures of Portus Albus.

The extent of Iulia Traducta is unknown, although it is supposed to have occupied the Villa Vieja of Algeciras. The area where material has been found extends to the lower part of the Villa Nueva on land beside the Río de la Miel. The river's estuary, now silted up by alluvial deposits, served as a port for landing fish.

== Later history ==
The History of the Franks by Gregory of Tours says that Iulia Traducta is where the Vandals boarded their vessels when they invaded Africa in the year 429. (Note: Iulia Traducta was at the southern point of Spain. Gregory of Tours may have just meant that the Vandals were driven "right out of Spain, from north to south" by the Suebi, rather than that they left from that port.) After that date, there are no more classical sources, implying that Iulia Traducta was abandoned until the Muslim invasion of Spain in the year 711. However, in recent years structures from the Byzantine period have been found in the Villa Vieja, including a cemetery dating from the sixth century. There have also been found the remains of amphora production and even a Byzantine chalice near the later Muslim mosque. From this it can be said that the city was not completely abandoned at any time, and even when the Arab invasion occurred, the resident population of the town was probably the most important in the area of the Strait of Gibraltar.
