= Valdevaqueros =

- Village and beach
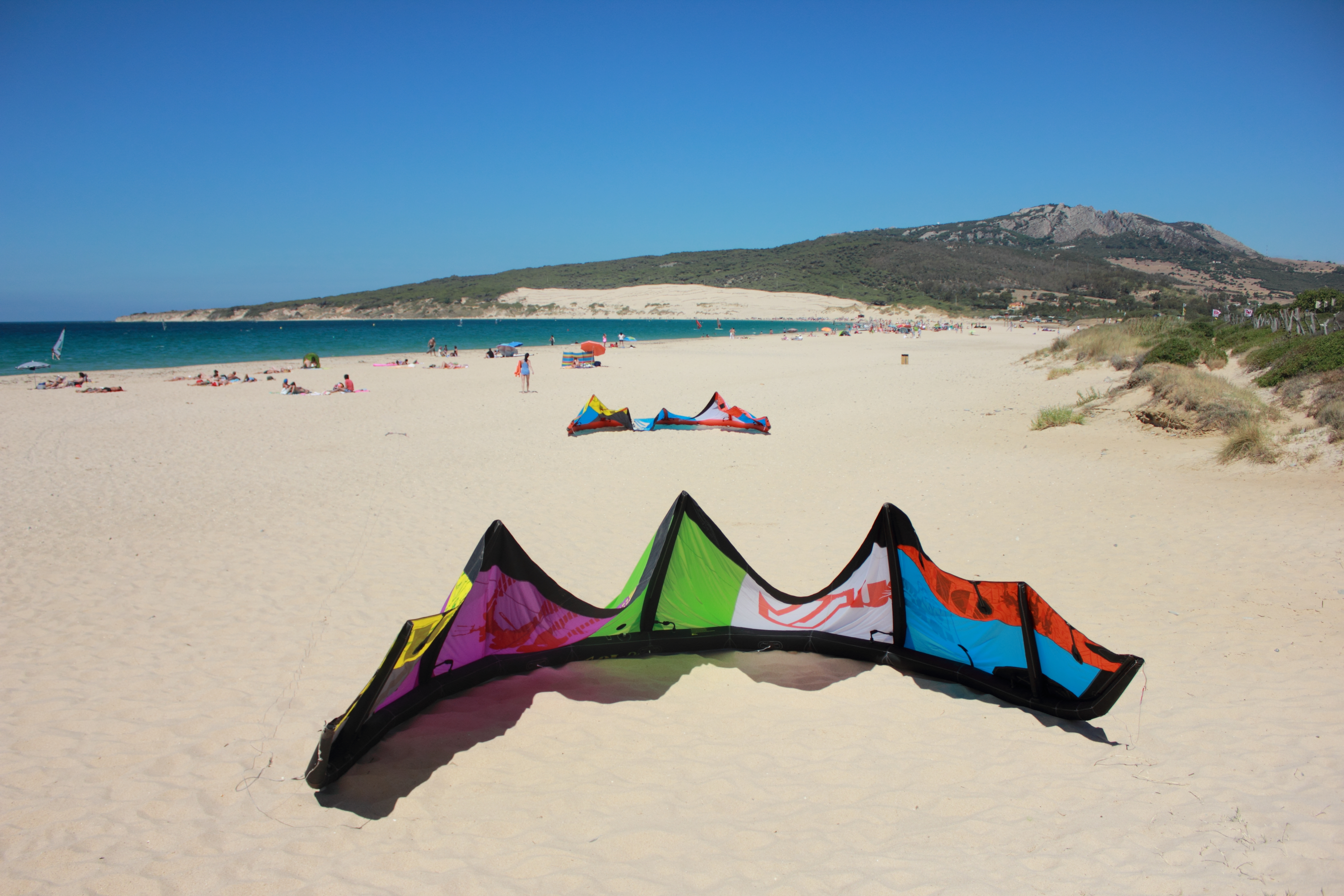
- Playa de Valdevaqueros

- Location in the Province of Cádiz Valdevaqueros (Spain)
- Coordinates: 36°04′02″N 5°40′41″W
- Country: Spain
- Autonomous community: Andalusia
- Province: Cádiz
- Comarca: Campo de Gibraltar
- Municipality: Tarifa
- Judicial district: Algeciras
- Time zone: UTC+1 (CET)
  - Summer (DST): UTC+2 (CEST)
- Official language(s): Spanish

Valdevaqueros is a village and beach in the municipality of Tarifa in the Province of Cadiz in southern Spain. It is located 9.7 kilometres (6.0 mi) by road to the northwest of Tarifa. Casa de Porros is a hamlet in the northwestern part. the beach measures about 4,050 metres (13,290 ft) by about 120 metres (390 ft) on average. Valdevaqueros has the Spin Out Kite surfing centre, established in 1988, and beachhouse and several hotels and a camping site and is a busy beach during the summer months, and borders the Playa de Los Lances. Behind a large dune created to protect the Punta Paloma coastal battery (currently dismantled). Arroyo Valdevaqueros, on the eastern entrance point has several houses and a coast-guard station. In the western part of the beach is the mouth of the river valley that forms a broad estuary that runs along the beach a few metres from the sea until reaching several hundred metres east.

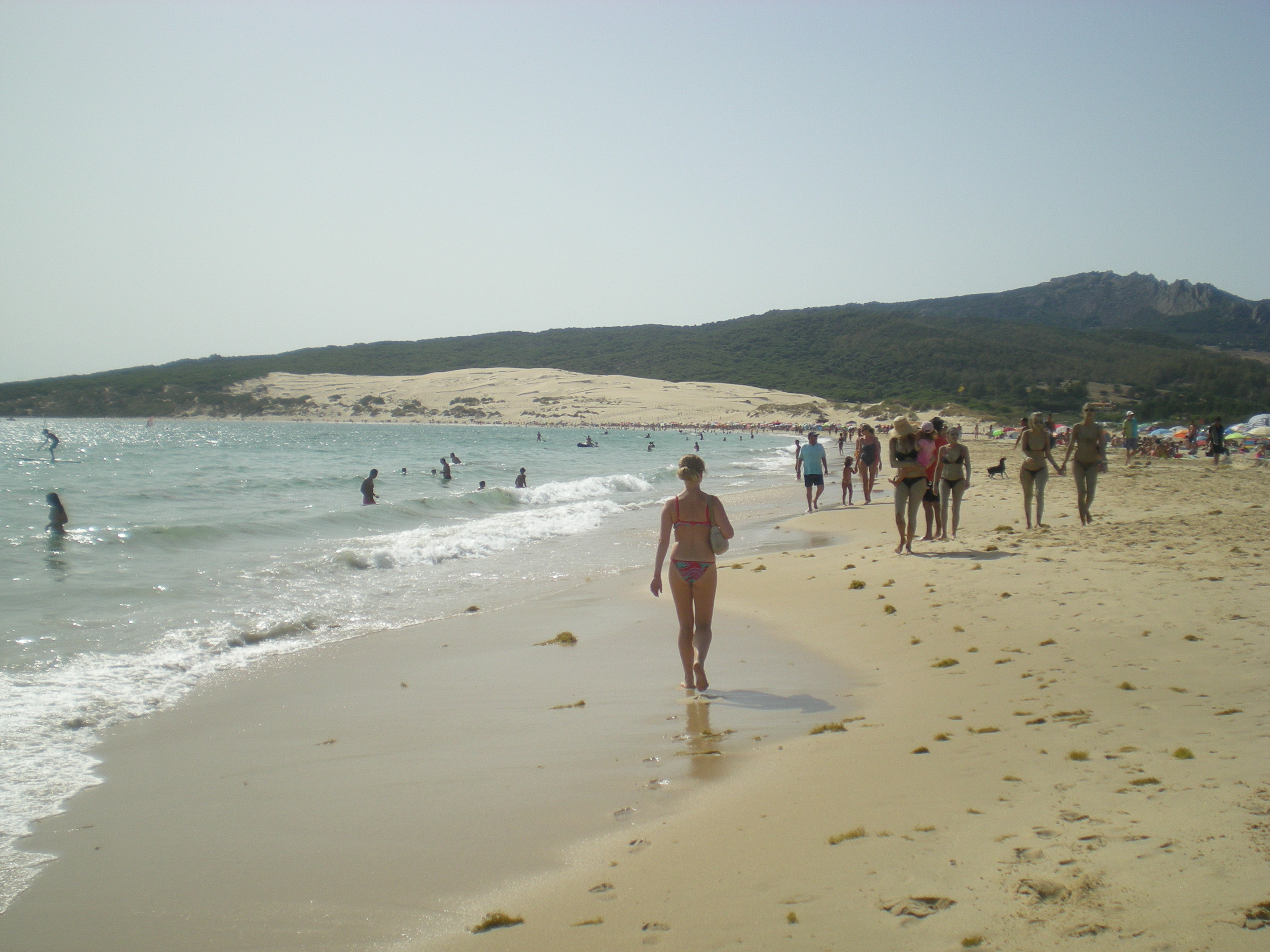
Playa de Valdevaqueros during busy summer season

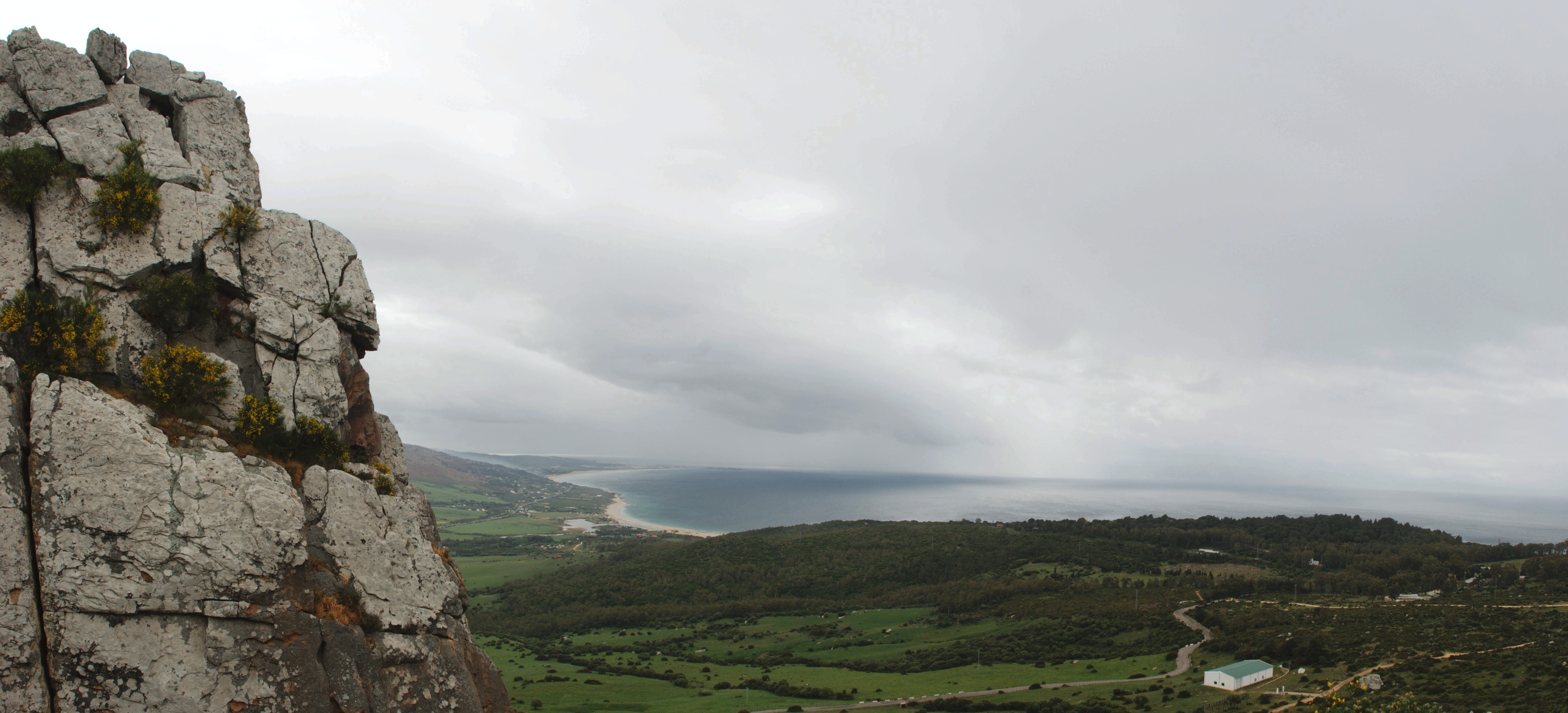
View of Valdevaqueros from inland
