= Bolonia, Spain =

Bolonia
- Village and beach
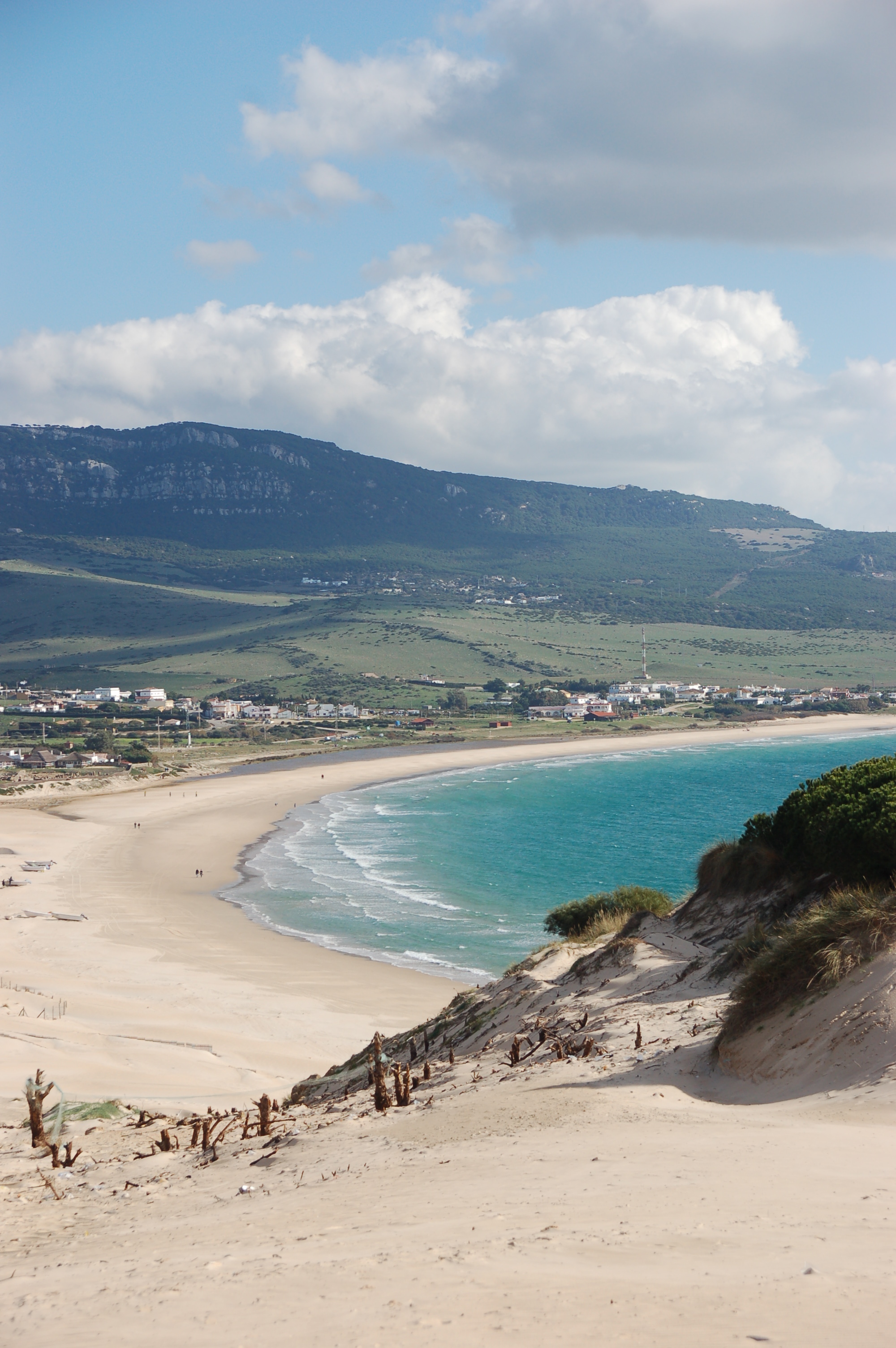

- Location in the Province of Cádiz Bolonia (Andalusia) Bolonia (Spain)
- Coordinates: 36°4′17″N 5°41′40″W
- Country: Spain
- Autonomous community: Andalusia
- Province: Cádiz
- Comarca: Campo de Gibraltar
- Municipality: Tarifa
- Judicial district: Algeciras

Population (2011)
  - Total: 117
- Time zone: UTC+1 (CET)
  - Summer (DST): UTC+2 (CEST)
- Official language(s): Spanish

Bolonia is a coastal village and beach in the municipality of Tarifa in the Province of Cadiz in southern Spain. It is located on the Atlantic shore, 22.9 kilometres (14.2 mi) by road west of Tarifa, but is much closer in terms of coastal distance. The beach and bay is also known as Playa de Bolonia ("Bolonia Beach"), Ensenada de Bolonia ("Bolonia Cove"), or Bolonia Bay. The ruins of the Roman town of Baelo Claudia are located near the beach, considered to be the most complete Roman town ruins yet uncovered in Spain. The beach is about 3.8 kilometres (2.4 mi) in length, with an average width of about 70 metres (230 ft). In 2011 it had a population of 117 people.

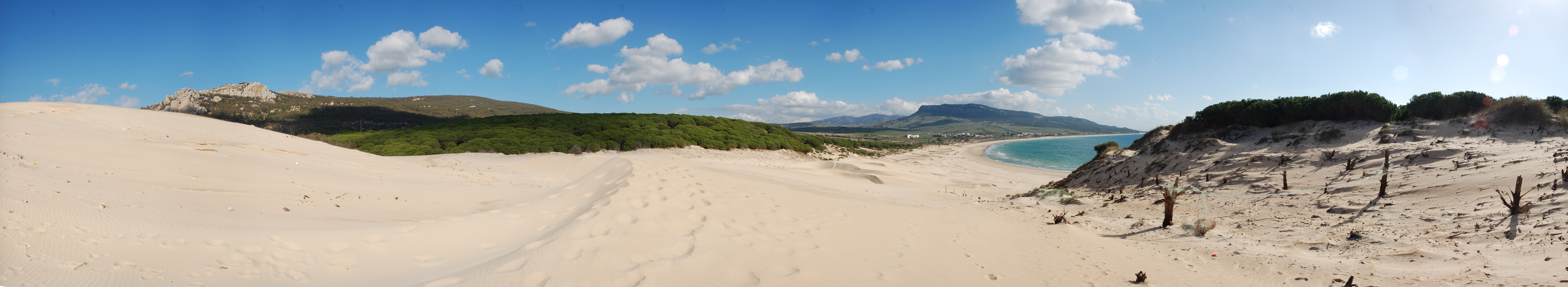
Bolonia beach
