= Baelo Claudia =

Ancient Roman town in Hispania

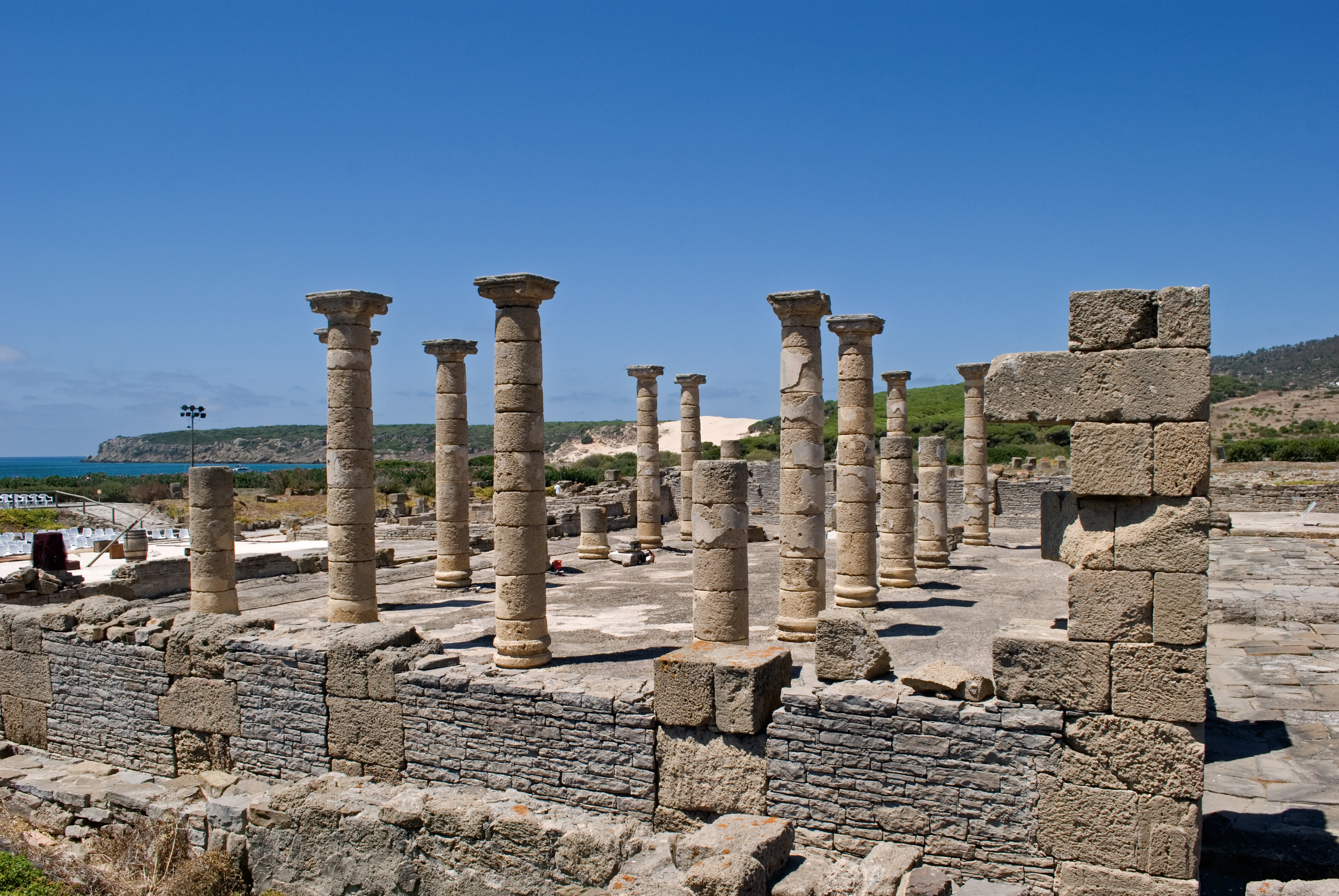
- The ruins lie along the beach

- Location within Province of Cádiz Location within Andalusia Location within Spain
- 36°05′23″N 05°46′29″W
- Type: Settlement
- Location: Bolonia, Province of Cádiz, Andalusia, Spain

History
- Built: End of the 2nd century BC
- Abandoned: 6th century AD

Baelo Claudia was an ancient Roman town in Hispania, located 22 kilometres (14 mi) outside of Tarifa, near the village of Bolonia, in southern Spain. Situated on the shore of the Strait of Gibraltar, the town began as a fishing village and trading hub when it was settled approximately 2,000 years ago. Although a prosperous town at the time of Emperor Claudius, it went into a decline partially fueled by earthquakes and was abandoned by the 6th century.

The study of its architectural remains shows that the Roman town originated at the end of the 2nd century BC, and from the beginning possessed a great wealth that made it an important economic center in the Mediterranean area.

== History ==
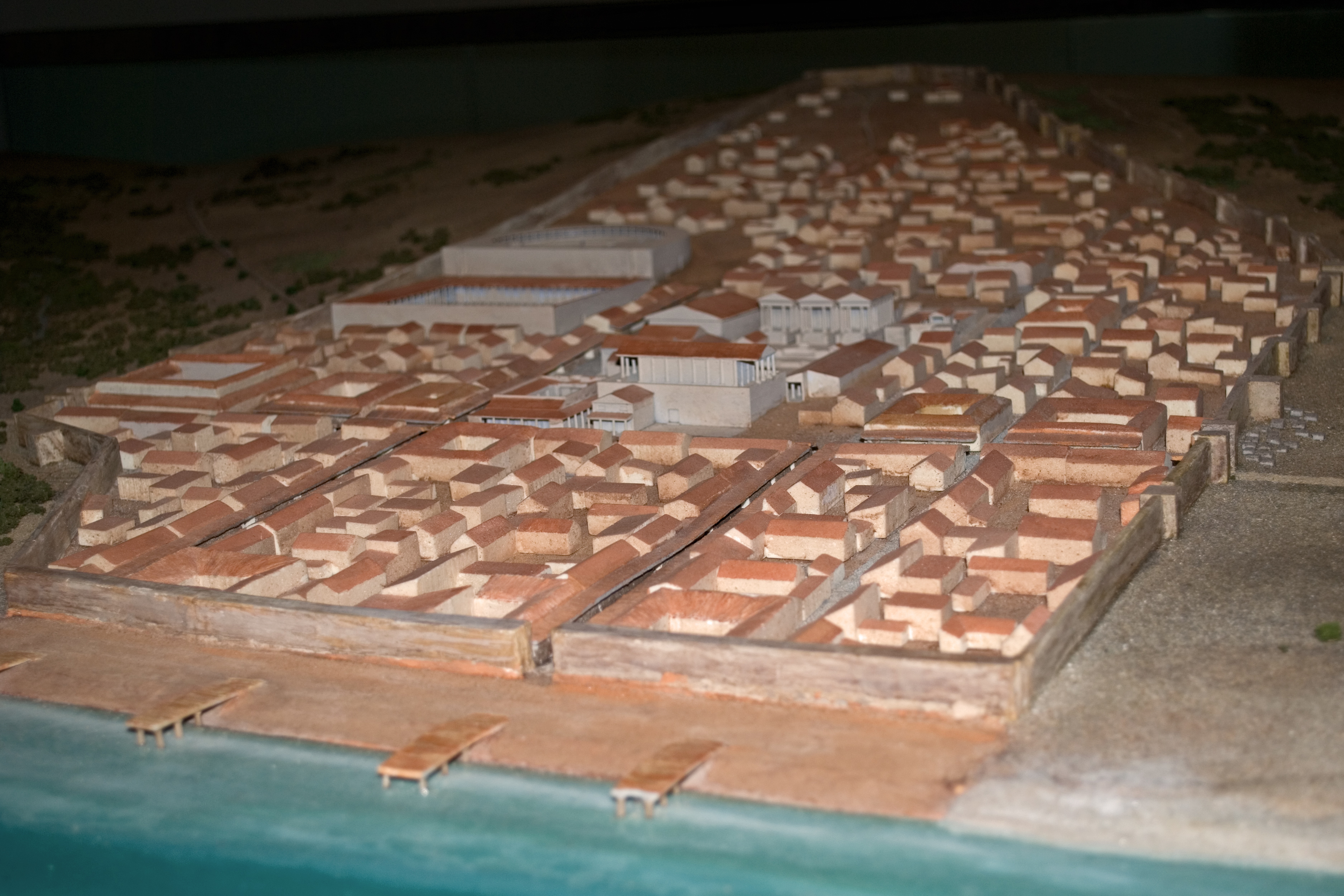
A model of the city

Baelo Claudia is situated on the northern shore of the Strait of Gibraltar. The town was founded at the end of the 2nd century BC as a result of trade with North Africa (it was a major port for Tangier, in Mauretania Tingitana, for example). It is possible that Baelo Claudia had some functions as an administrative center, but tuna fishing, salting, and the production of garum were the primary sources of wealth. The city was eventually successful enough to be granted the title of municipium by Emperor Claudius.

The life of the inhabitants reached its greatest splendor between the 1st century BC and the 2nd century AD. In the middle of the 2nd century, however, the town went into decline, probably as a result of a major earthquake which wiped out a large part of it. In addition to the natural disaster, during the 3rd century, the town was beset by hordes of pirates, both Germanic and Barbary. Although it experienced a slight renaissance later in the century, the town became abandoned by the 6th century.

Excavations have revealed the most comprehensive remains of a Roman town in the Iberian Peninsula, with extremely interesting monuments such as the basilica, theatre, market, and the temple of Isis. The spectacular setting in El Estrecho Natural Park allows visitors to see the coast of Morocco. A modern visitors' centre showcases many artefacts and has a comprehensive introduction to the site. It also offers parking, shade, toilets, a shop and good views of the sea. Admission is free to citizens of the European Economic Area (with an ID).

== The archeological site ==
The figure of Jorge Bonsor is key in the recovery of the archaeological site.

Its urban layout showcases the two main roads of a typical Roman city plan: the decumanus maximus, which ran from east to west and had the entrances to the city on either side, and the cardo maximus, which ran north to south, crossing the decumanus maximus at a right angle.

The intersection of these two main streets marked the location of the Forum (main square), whose current pavement contains the original slabs from Tarifa, preserved since the 1st century. This was an open square with porticos on three sides, and the main public buildings distributed around it. One of the porticos provided access to three of the buildings: the emperor's temple, the curia, and another that served as a meeting room. The main building, located at the back, is the basilica, which served various purposes, especially as the seat of the courts of justice; and on the left side there were small rectangular stone structures: the shops, or tabernae.

The archaeological site preserves the most representative elements that form the essence of a Roman town, namely:

- Stone walls, reinforced with more than forty watchtowers. The main gates of the city are preserved: the west gate, which lead to Gades, and the east gate, leading to Carteia (near San Roque). There was a third gate on the north of the city, called the Asido Gate.
- Administrative buildings: curia (local senate) and the municipal archive.
- A public square (forum).
- A courthouse (judicial basilica), located in the forum in front of the temples. It has a rectangular plan measuring 19.5 by 35.5 meters. It was presided by an over 3-meter-tall (9.8 ft) statue of the emperor Trajan.
- Four temples: three of them, one for each member of the Capitoline Triad (Jupiter, Juno and Minerva). Such a triple layout has been found elsewhere only in Sbeitla, Tunisia. There is also an Iseum (temple of the Egyptian goddess Isis), related to the Isiac cult on the peninsula.
- The largest building in Baelo Claudia is the theater, with a capacity of up to 2000 people, where all the actors were men, even those playing female roles. They wore masks depending on the character they represented.
- Remains of the tabernae (shops); the macellum (market); an enclosed area for the sale of meat and other food, formed by 14 stores and an inner courtyard; and the thermae (bath houses).

Four aqueducts supplied water to the city. The industrial area includes the remains of garum-manufacturing facilities, streets, aqueducts, remnants of the sewerage system, etc. No other Roman sites on the Iberian Peninsula offer such a complete view of Roman urbanism as Baelo Claudia. The significance of the site is enhanced by the spectacular landscape that surrounds the city.

Its status as a Bien de Interés Cultural (Property of Cultural Interest) was officially announced in 1925 in the Gaceta de Madrid, the state gazette. The archaeological site has been accompanied by a museum since 2007, incorporated into the Institutional Headquarters and Visitors Center of the Archaeological Site of Baelo Claudia. The museum was designed by the architect Guillermo Vázquez Consuegra.

== Gallery ==
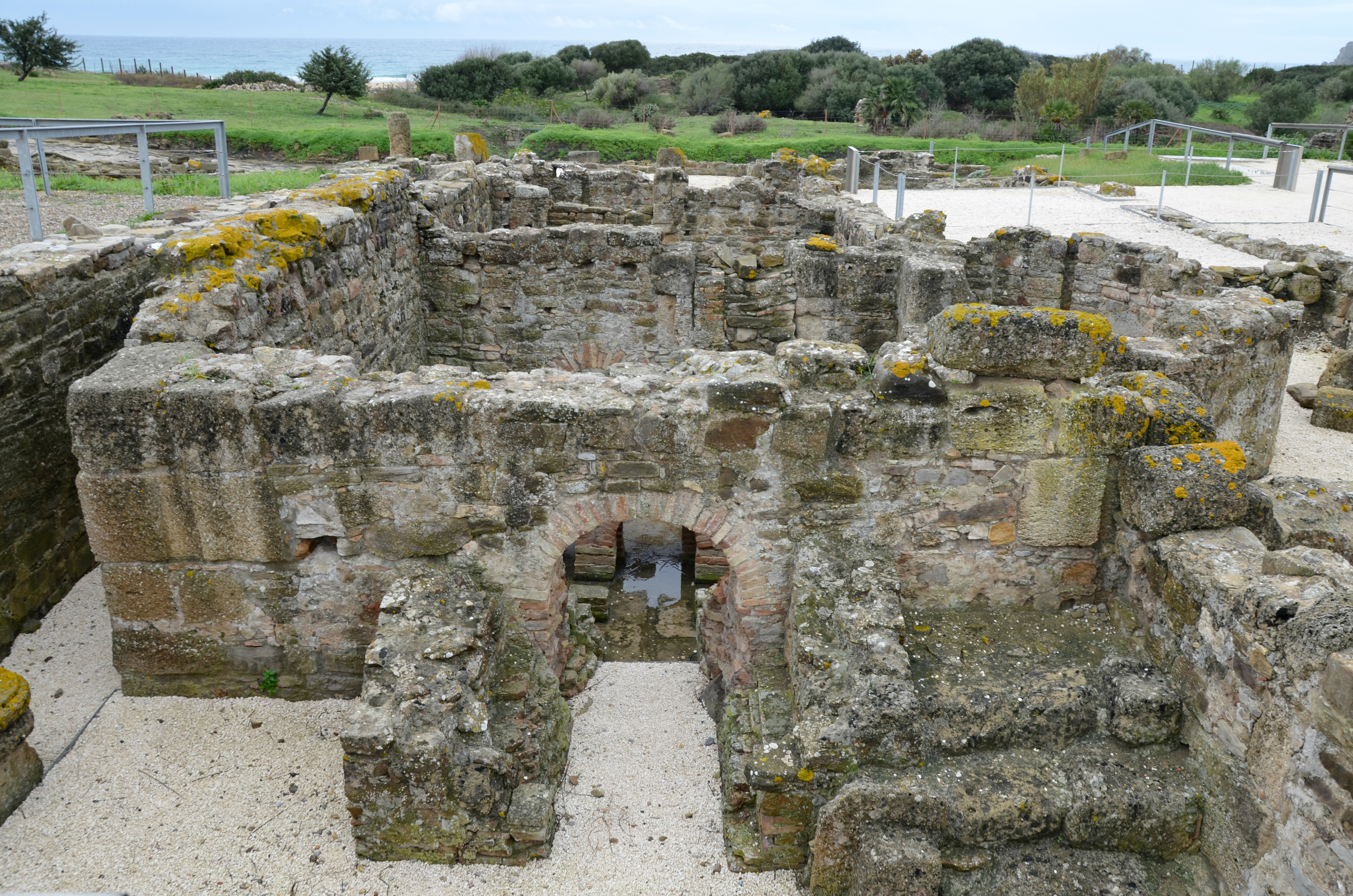
Termae

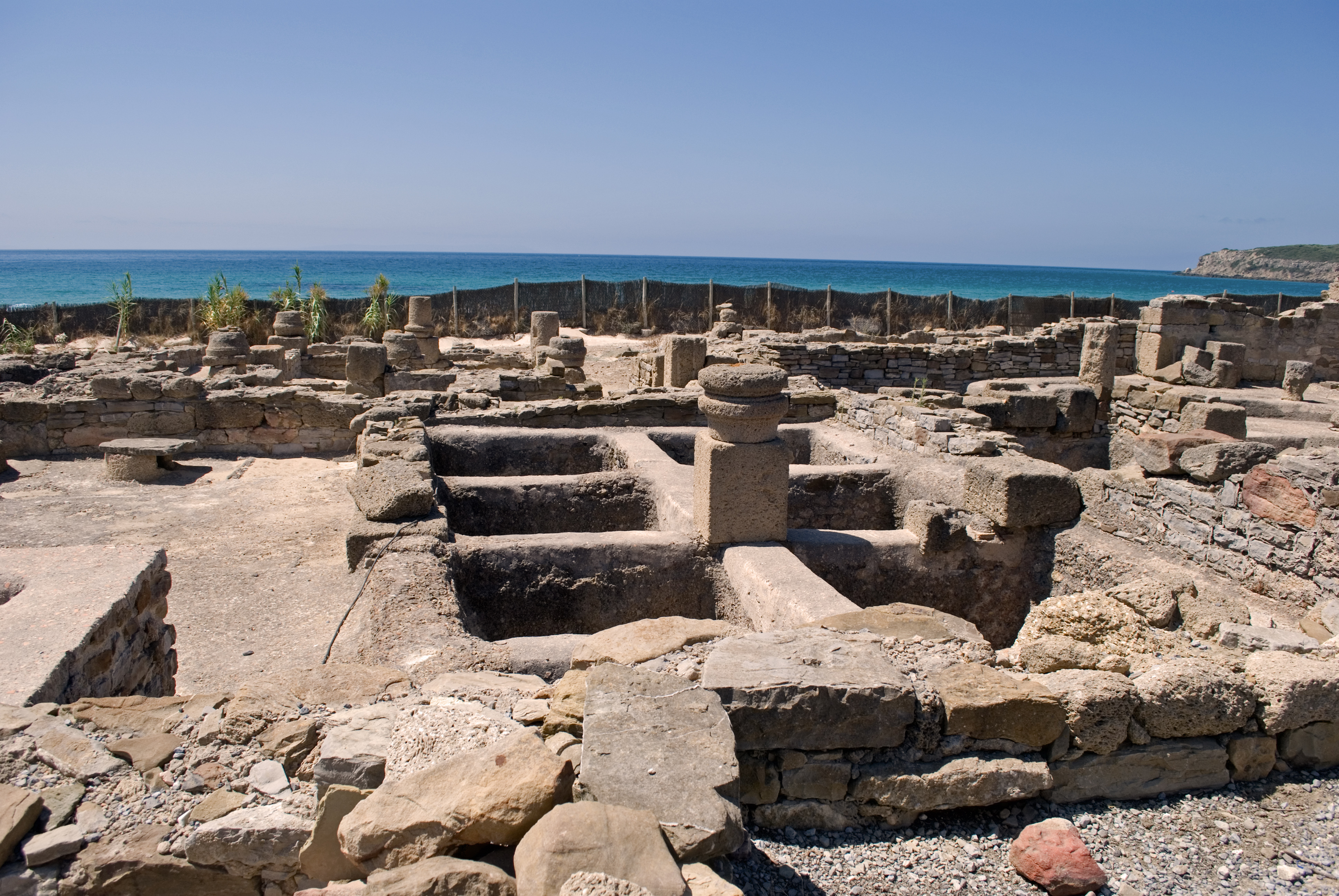
Ruins of a factory for salted fish and garum (fish sauce)

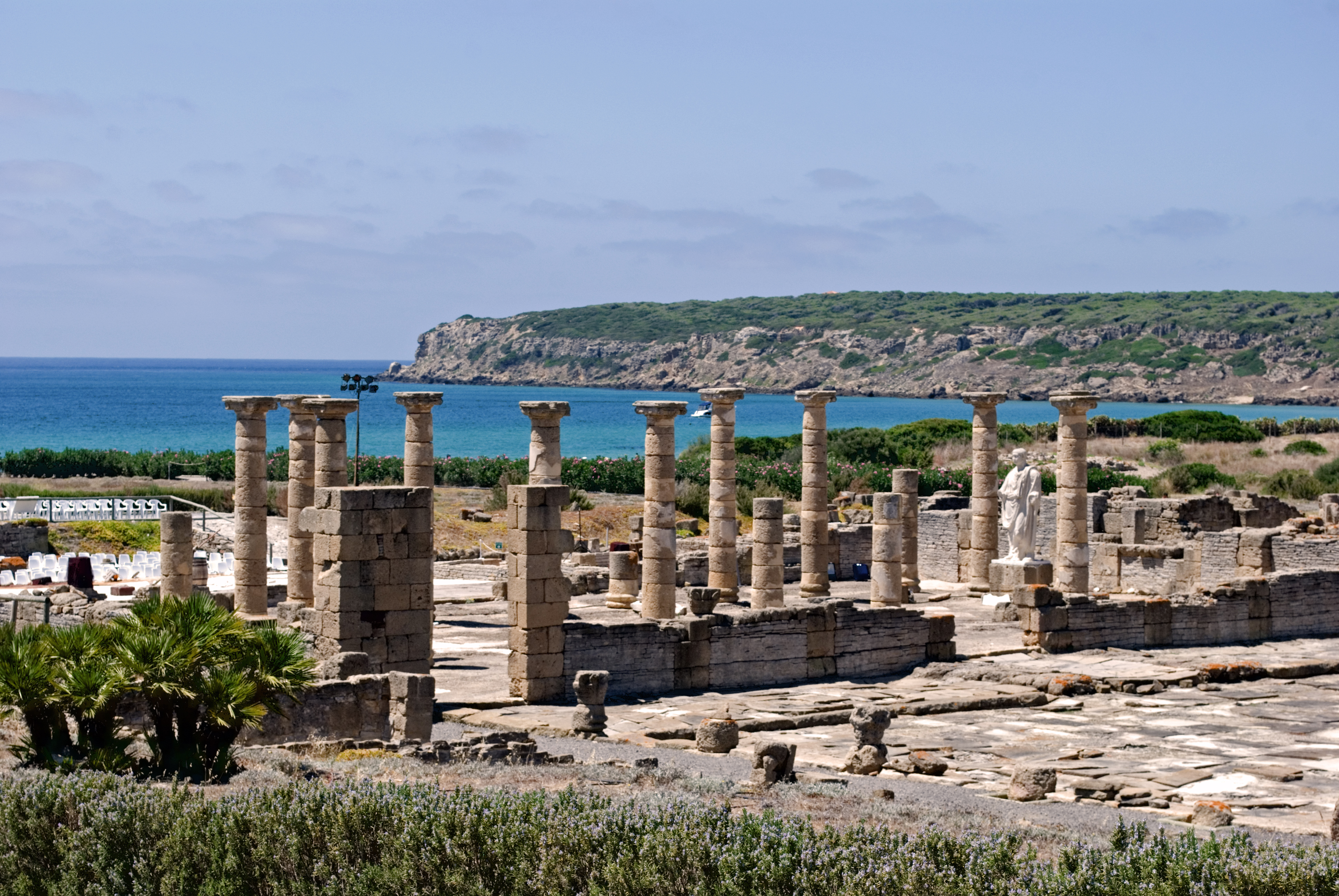
The Basilica

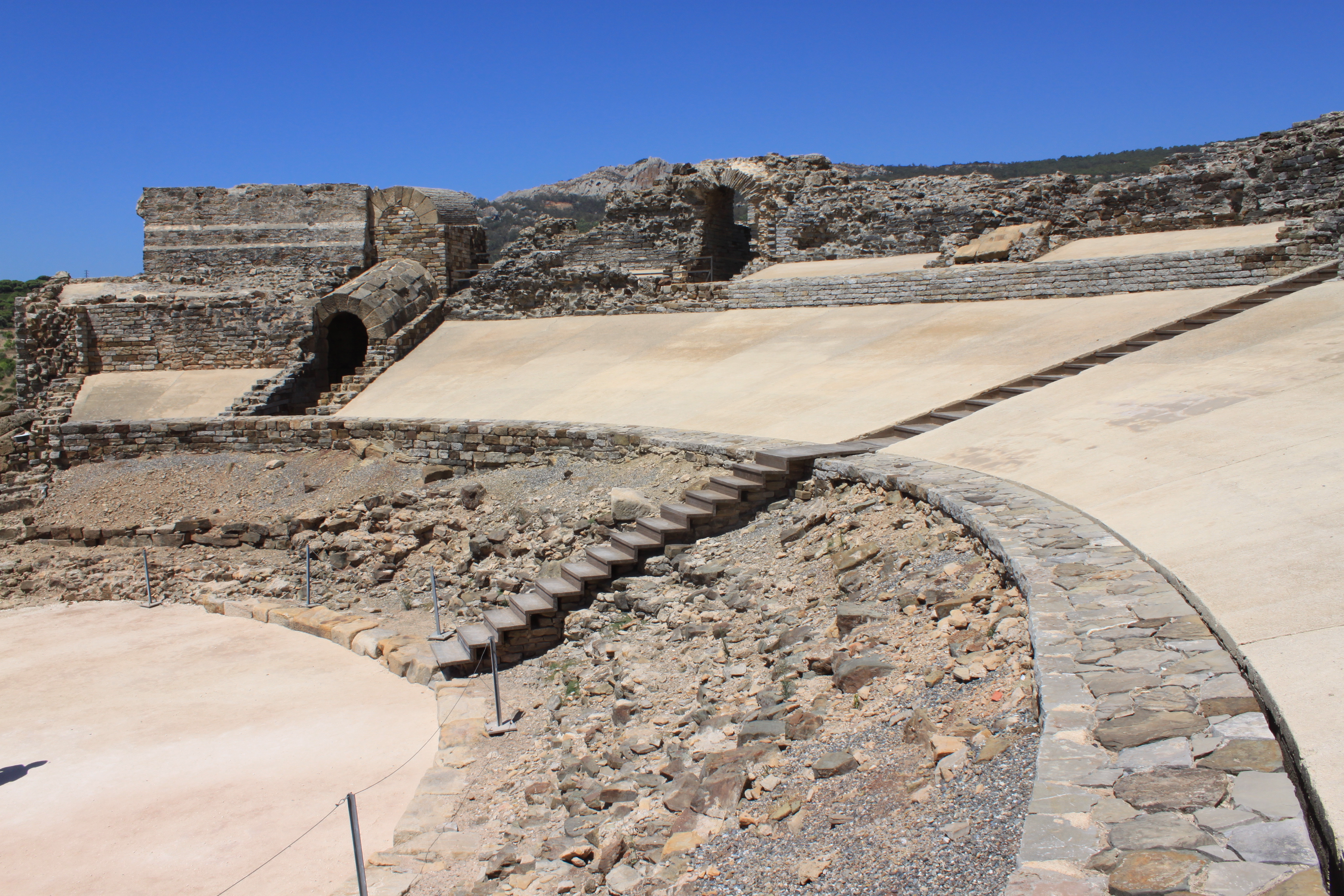
The Roman theater, which has been partially restored

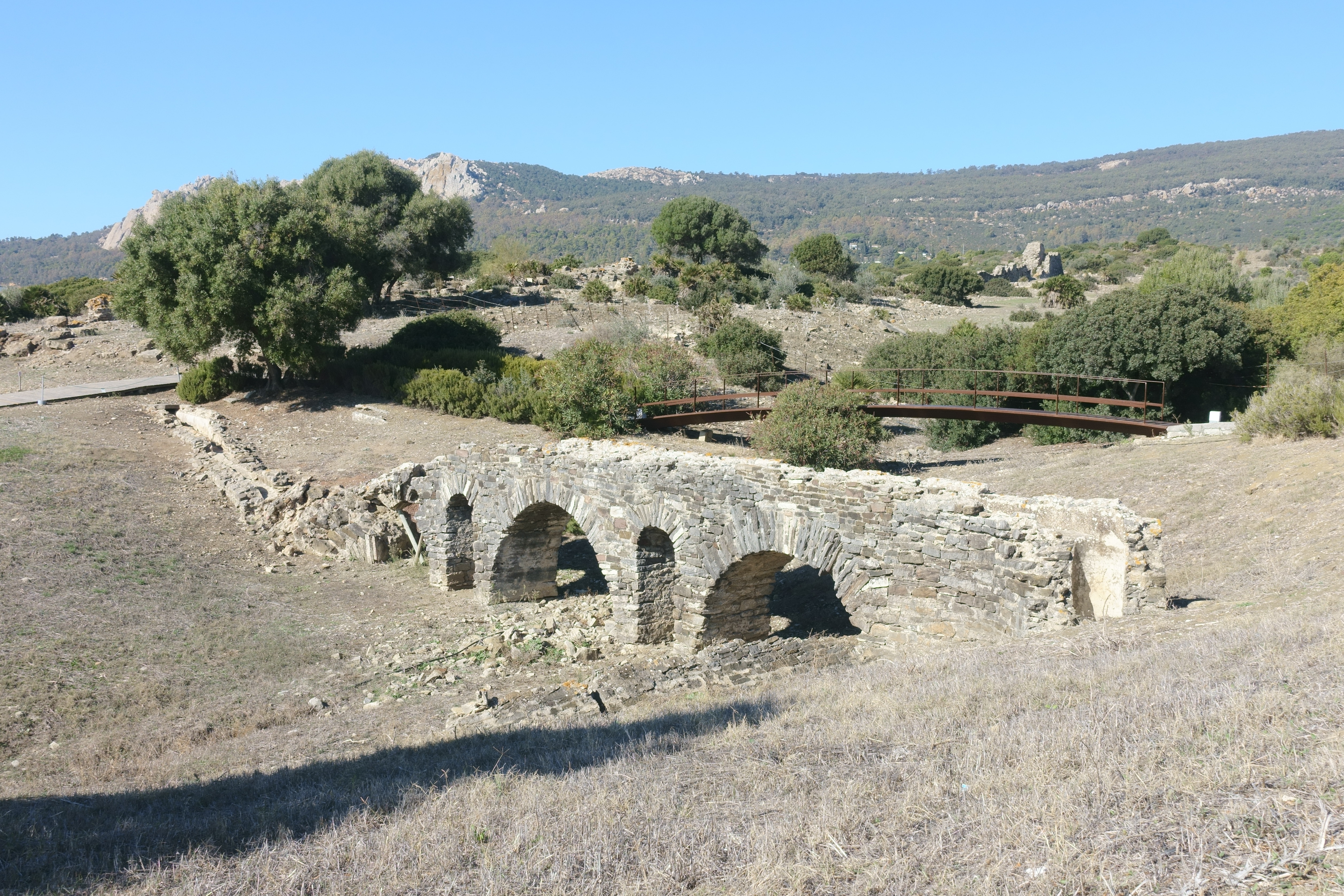
The Aqueduct
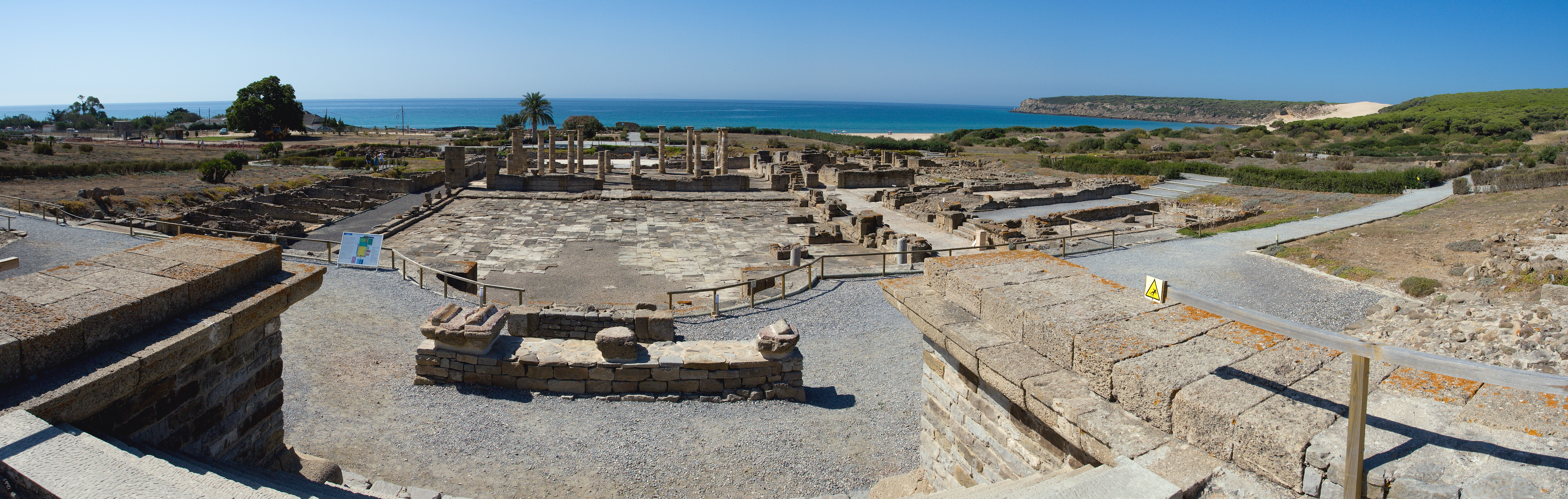
Forum

== The current site ==
The archaeological site is next to a tourist area, so it is beginning to exploit its potential cultural tourism. The site is easily accessed and visits are free.

The Junta de Andalucía has built a new visitor reception center (designed by the architect Guillermo Vázquez Consuegra) and has carried out a Landscape Action Project in the Bolonia beach (written and executed by the Andalusian Institute of Historical Heritage between 2010 and 2013). Likewise, the University of Cádiz conducts studies on the site, giving rise to new discoveries, such as the only copy of the Doryphoros of Polykleitos in Hispania.

== See also ==
- List of Bien de Interés Cultural in the Province of Cádiz

== Sources ==
- Sillières, Pierre (1995). Baelo Claudia, une cité romaine de Bétique. Madrid.
