= Municipal Museum of Algeciras =

Local museum in Algeciras, Spain

- Museo Municipal de Algeciras (Spanish)
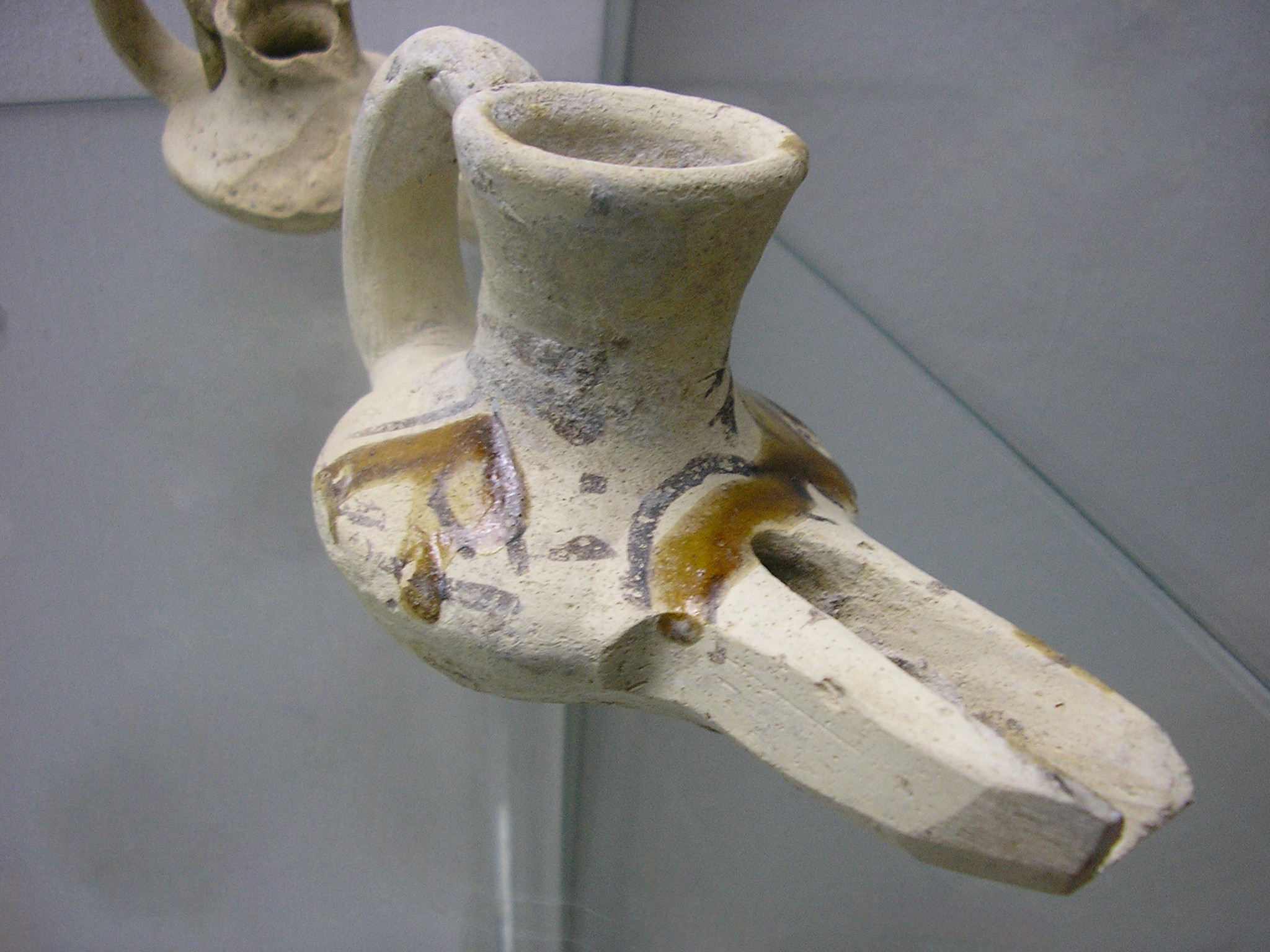
- An Arab candle holder in the museum

- Location within Province of Cádiz Location within Spain
- 36.1247°N 5.4455°W
- Location: Algeciras, Spain

History
- Built: 19th century

Municipal Museum of Algeciras (Museo Municipal de Algeciras) is a museum in Algeciras, Spain, located at the northern end of the Parque de las Acacias de Algeciras. It was established in 1995 and is run by the city's cultural department. It houses a large collection of archaeological items which were found in different parts of the city. With its two main divisions, archaeology and history, the museum documents three periods in the city's history: Roman-Byzantine Algeciras, the Andalusian city, and the modern era. A third division, religious art, is located in the Capilla del Cristo de la Alameda.

== Geography ==
The Municipal Museum of Algeciras is located in the old town, near the Parque de Las Acacias, on the corner of Ortega y Gasset and Goya. A colonial building known as the Casa de los Guardeses (literally The Caretakers' House) which had served the Villa Smith, was renovated in 1995 to fit the needs of the museum.

== History ==
The museum was a result of work carried out by the Comisión Pro-Museo Histórico-Arqueológico (Committee for the Historical and Archaeological Museum). The items found at construction sites around the city provided a basis for documenting local heritage. When the museum was established in 1981, the Committee's artefacts became part of its collection although it was some time before they could be displayed.

== Layout ==
The main museum building is a two-storied structure. The four rooms on the lower level display exhibits from the prehistoric period and the Middle Ages. There are information panels and replicas of finds. The three rooms upstairs contain exhibits relating to the history of Algeciras Bay between the seventeenth and twentieth centuries.

== Collections ==
The archaeology collections are displayed in six rooms covering different periods: Prehistory, Antiquity, the Middle Ages (the Arab city), the Middle Ages (the Castilian city), Early Modern and Contemporary. Among the highlights are hand axes found in the vicinity of the Río Palmones and around the Almirante Tower, Roman amphorae found at Portus Albus and Iulia Traducta, tombstones from the Al-Yazirat Al-Hadra cemetery (discovered by the Marinid Walls of Algeciras), and artefacts related to the 1906 Algeciras Conference. The exhibits include a white marble sarcophagus, punic artefacts, and a collection of old coins and weapons. The ceramics displayed include a group of Islamic pieces submitted in 2002 by Antonio Torremocha Silva and Yolanda Oliva Cozar. A 2005 exhibit features artefacts from Callejon del Moro in San Roque, Cádiz found during excavations for a port facility. Artefacts found at the Paseo de las Palmeras are dated to the Byzantine era. The museum also commissioned a small-scale replica of a Spanish naval vessel, which sailed from the end of the thirteenth and throughout the fourteenth century. Measuring 65 by 26 centimetres (26 by 10 in), it is made of balsa wood and is now on display.

The religious art collection is exhibited in a former chapel known as Capilla del Cristo de la Alameda in Calle San Bernardo, a few hundred metres to the north. It opened in 1999 following extensive restoration of the eighteenth century chapel which was being used as an automobile repair shop. Its four rooms house displays of liturgical artefacts such as the Corpus Christi processional monstrance. Religious paintings include Francisco de Zurbarán's portrait of Santo Domingo de Guzmán.

== Gallery ==
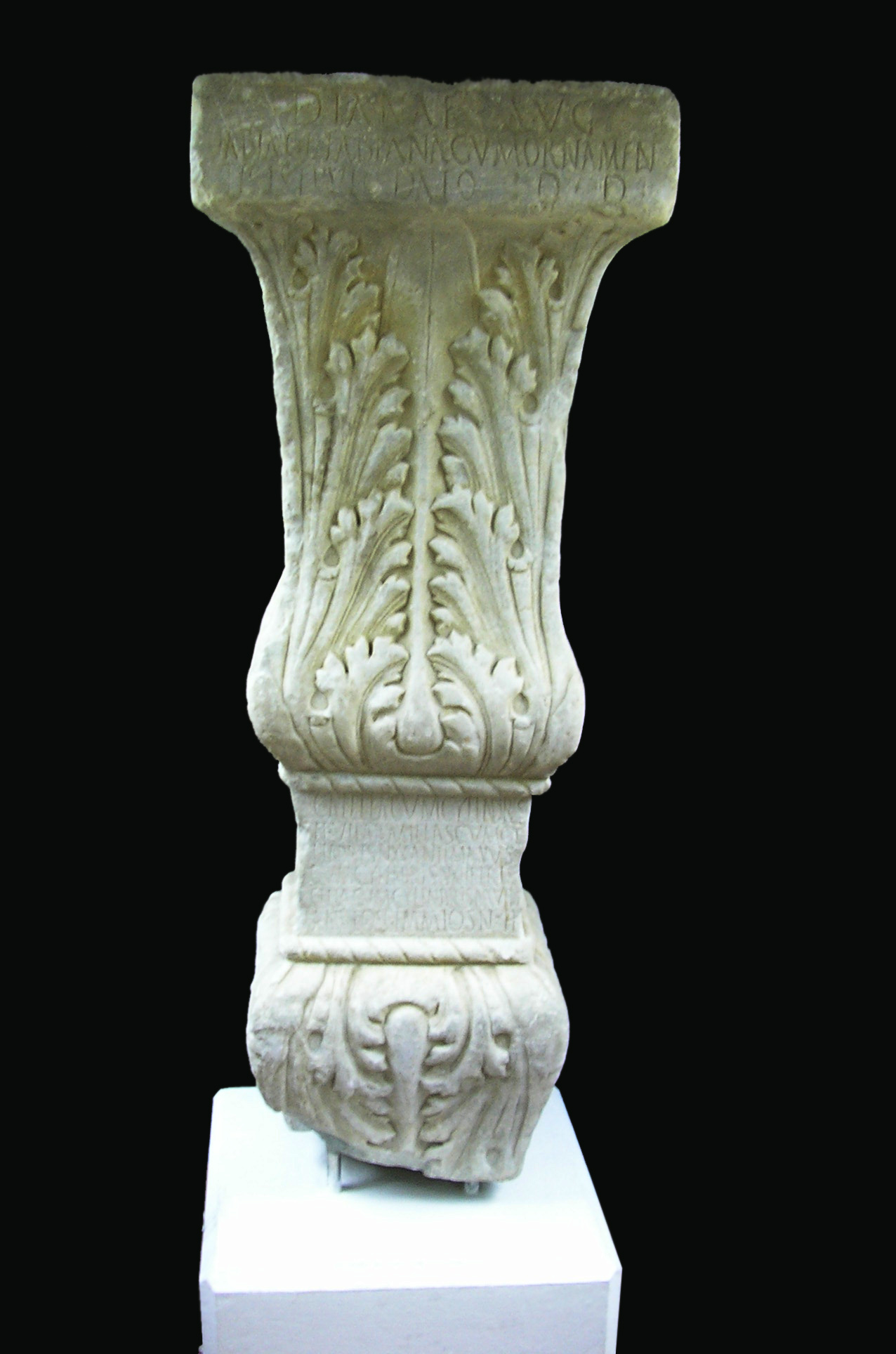
A pedestal

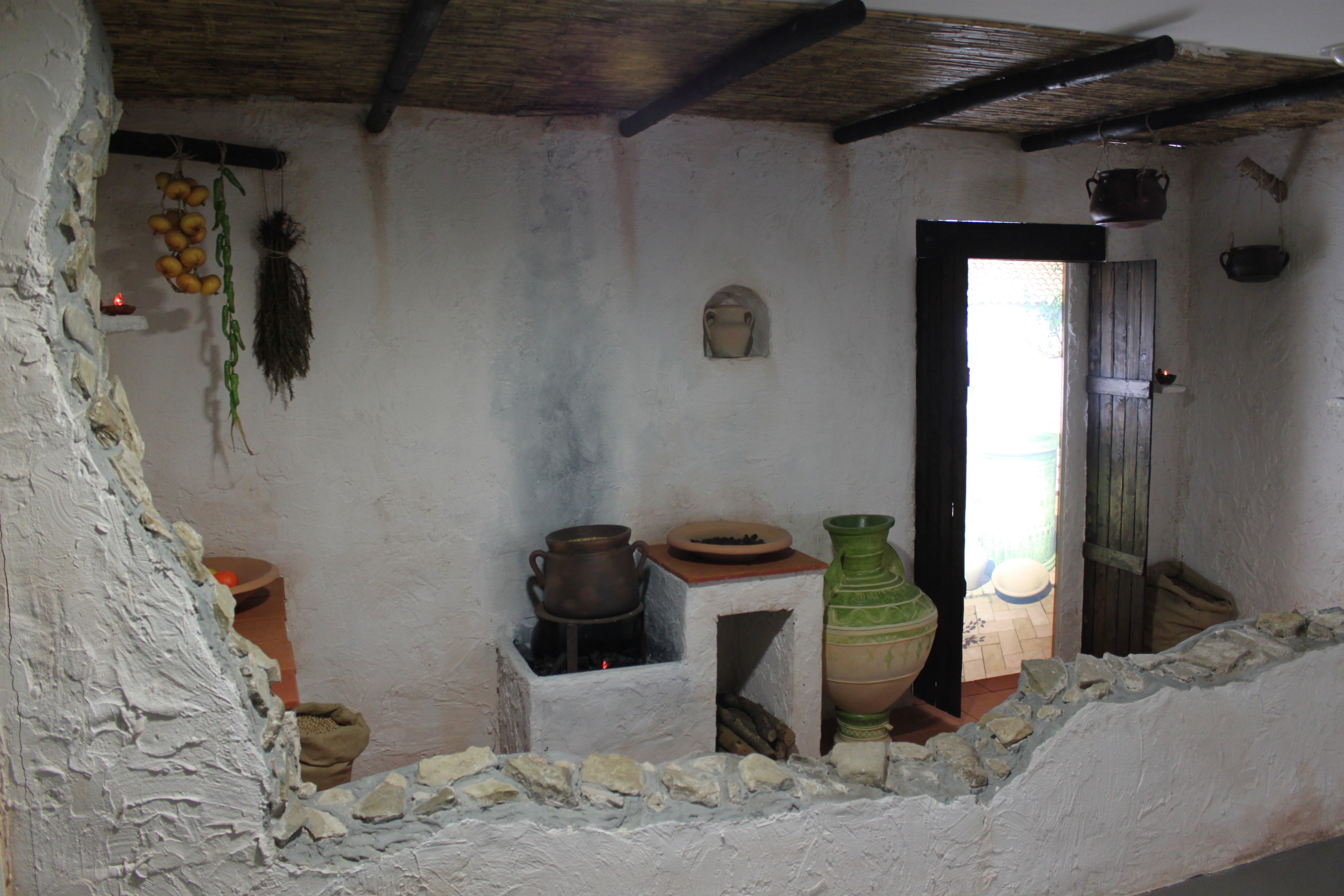
Simulation of Arab housing

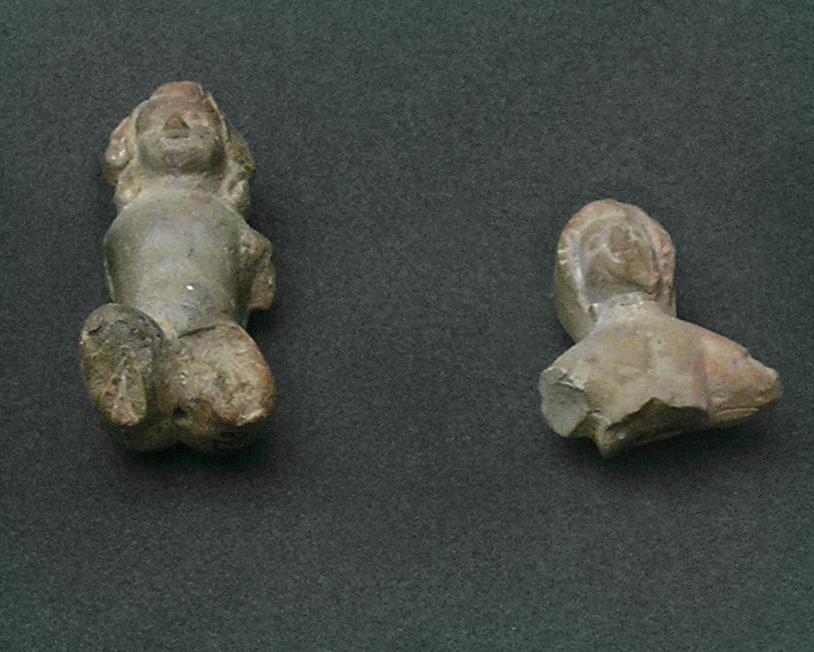
Terracotta figurines

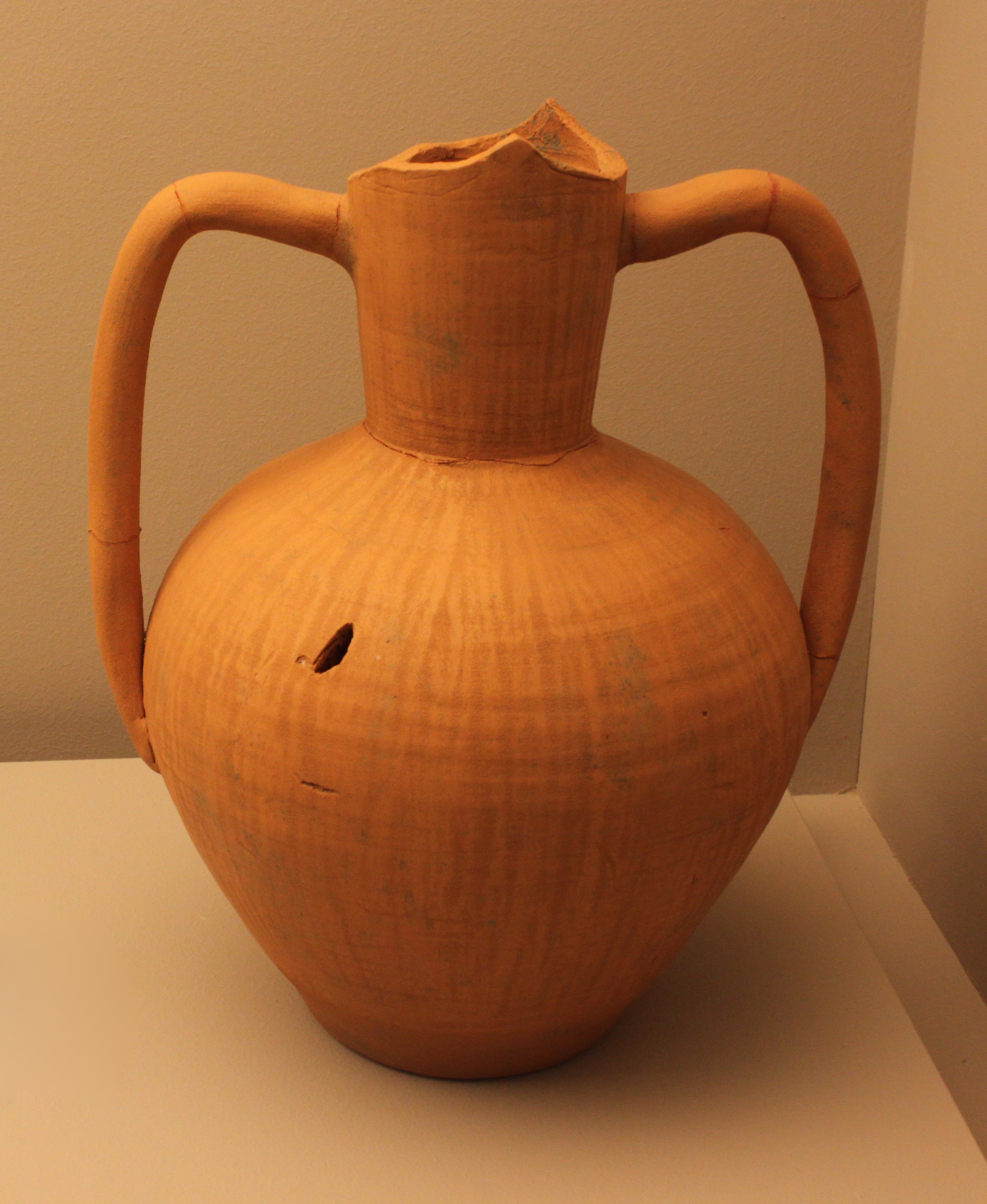
A ceramic pot
