= Torre de los Adalides =

Torre de los Adalides (Tower of the Champions)
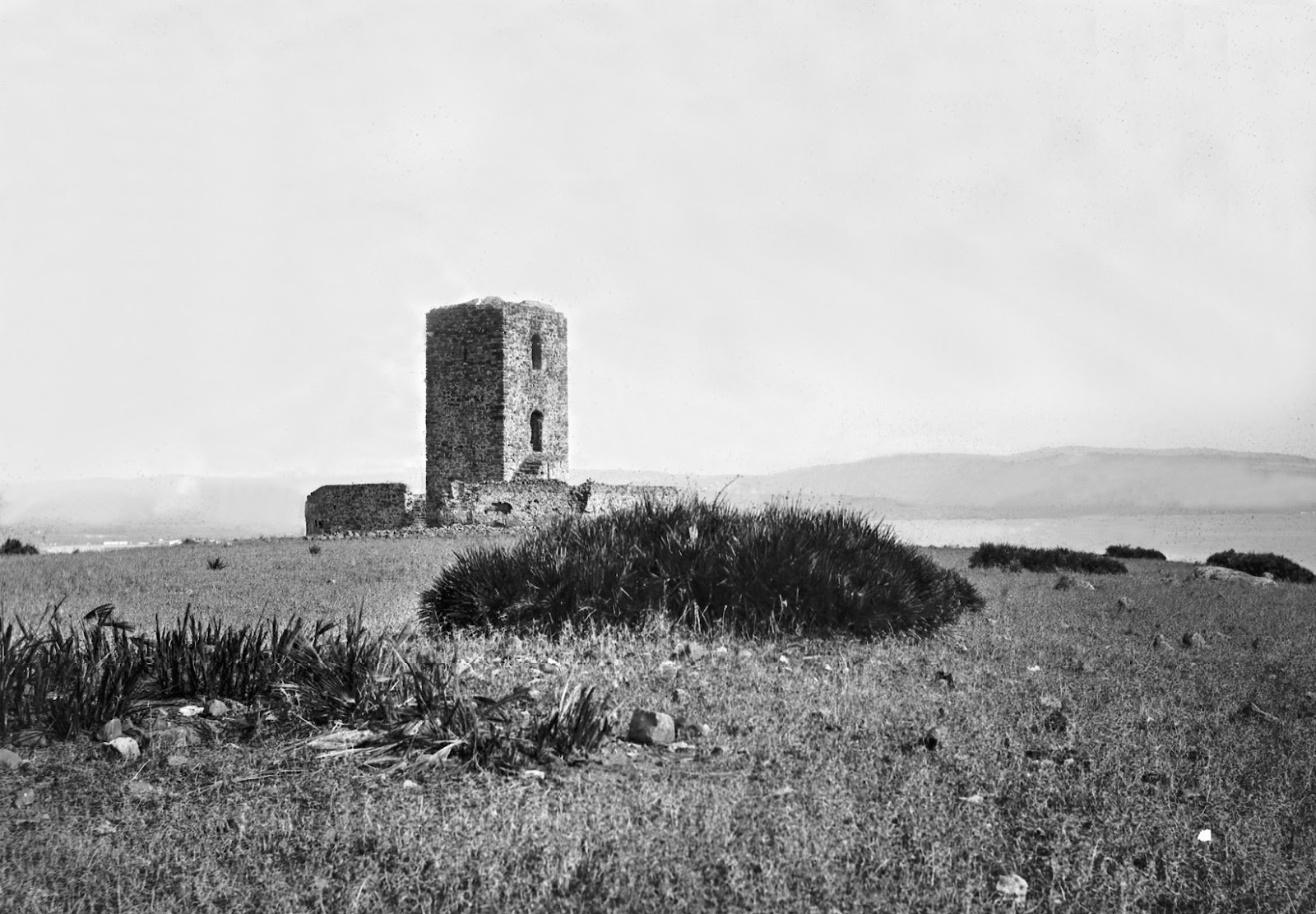
- Torre de los Adalides

- Location within Spain
- 36.1455°N 5.4611°W
- Location: Algeciras, Spain

History
- Built: 12th or 13th century

Site notes
- Architectural style: Islamic

Spanish Cultural Heritage
- Official name: Torre de los Adalides
- Type: Non-movable in ruins
- Criteria: Monument

The Torre de los Adalides (Tower of the Champions) was a rectangular medieval look-out tower of Islamic design located in the vicinity of Algeciras, Spain. It was situated roughly 1 kilometre (0.62 mi) from the coast on a hill some 100 metres (330 ft) above sea level in the area which is now covered by the city's northern suburbs. The tower was demolished by the Spaniards during the Spanish–American War as they thought the Americans might use it as a base of their own. The ruins of the tower are within military limits and cannot be approached without a formal permit.

== History ==
The tower was one of a series of watchtowers built during the twelfth and thirteenth centuries to monitor the Strait of Gibraltar and Algeciras Bay. Though, first mentioned in 1342, the exact date of construction is unknown, although presumably it must have occurred shortly before the capture of the town of Tarifa in 1289 when the Campo de Gibraltar region began to assume importance as a land border. The tower had visual contact with other watchtowers in the region including the Torre de Botafuegos and Torre del Almirante as well as with the towns of Al-Yazira Al-Jadra (today's Algeciras) and Carteia. It was the base for the forces of Alfonso XI of Castile during the long Siege of Algeciras (1342-1344). It takes its name from the Moors whose troops were based in the area and who were known as the adalides (champions). The king used the tower as his home during the siege of the town. In 1344, these troops were involved in the Battle of Río Palmones against Granada, which marked the end of the siege and the surrender of the city of Algeciras.

In 1776, the tower was being used as a powder store, protected by a small guard. By 1832, it had fallen into disrepair and was no longer in use. It was finally destroyed by army engineers in July 1898 during the Spanish–American War as there were fears it might be used by the enemy as a landmark for bombarding a nearby battery or as a base for setting up a provisional battery of their own. Today, the tower's foundations are located in the courtyard of the barracks of the same name.

== Architecture ==
Little remains of the structure today, but plenty of historical data and photographs provide an insight into the structure and proportions. The tower had three floors, the first of them separated from the rest and that was accessed by a door at ground level. The second floor had a ladder attached to the wall outside. The third was reached by interior stairs. The building had a height of 14 metres (46 ft) and was rectangular in shape, 4 by 6 metres (13 by 20 ft), with walls 1.5 metres (4 ft 11 in) thick. The tower was surrounded by an octagonal mud wall, 80 inches (2,000 mm) thick and 3.5–4.5 metres (11–15 ft) high.
