= Paseo Cornisa =

Park in Spain

Coordinates: 36°08′43″N 5°26′47″W

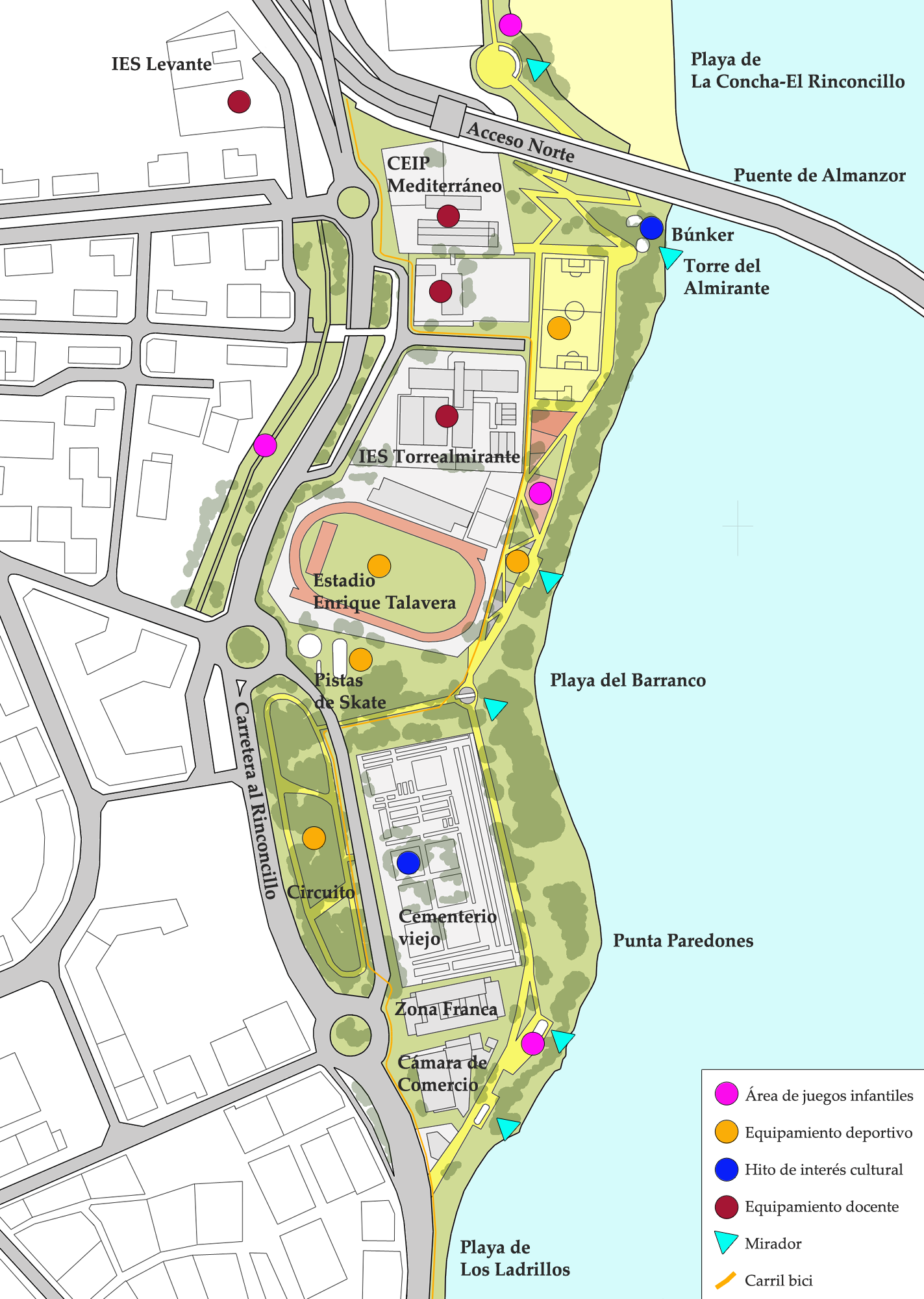
Map of the park

Paseo Cornisa is a park in Algeciras, Spain. It was inaugurated in May 2007. It stretches for just over a kilometre between Punta del Cementerio and Punta del Almirante in the north of the city near the old cemetery and parallel to the Playa del Barranco and Playa de El Rinconcillo. The park has an area of over 20,000 square metres (220,000 sq ft). Within the park is the Torre del Almirante or Admiral's Tower which dates from the 14th century.

In the eighteenth century La Almiranta Battery was near the tower and its role was to defend the city of Algeciras. It worked with the other coastal batteries to defend the area during the Battle of Algeciras in 1801. This battery was partially destroyed by a magazine explosion in the nineteenth century which also damaged the tower.

During the Spanish Civil War the battery was used as a place for machine guns. Nearby was an area that was used by firing squads.
