= Marinid Walls of Algeciras =

- Parque Arqueológico de las Murallas Meriníes de Algeciras (Spanish)
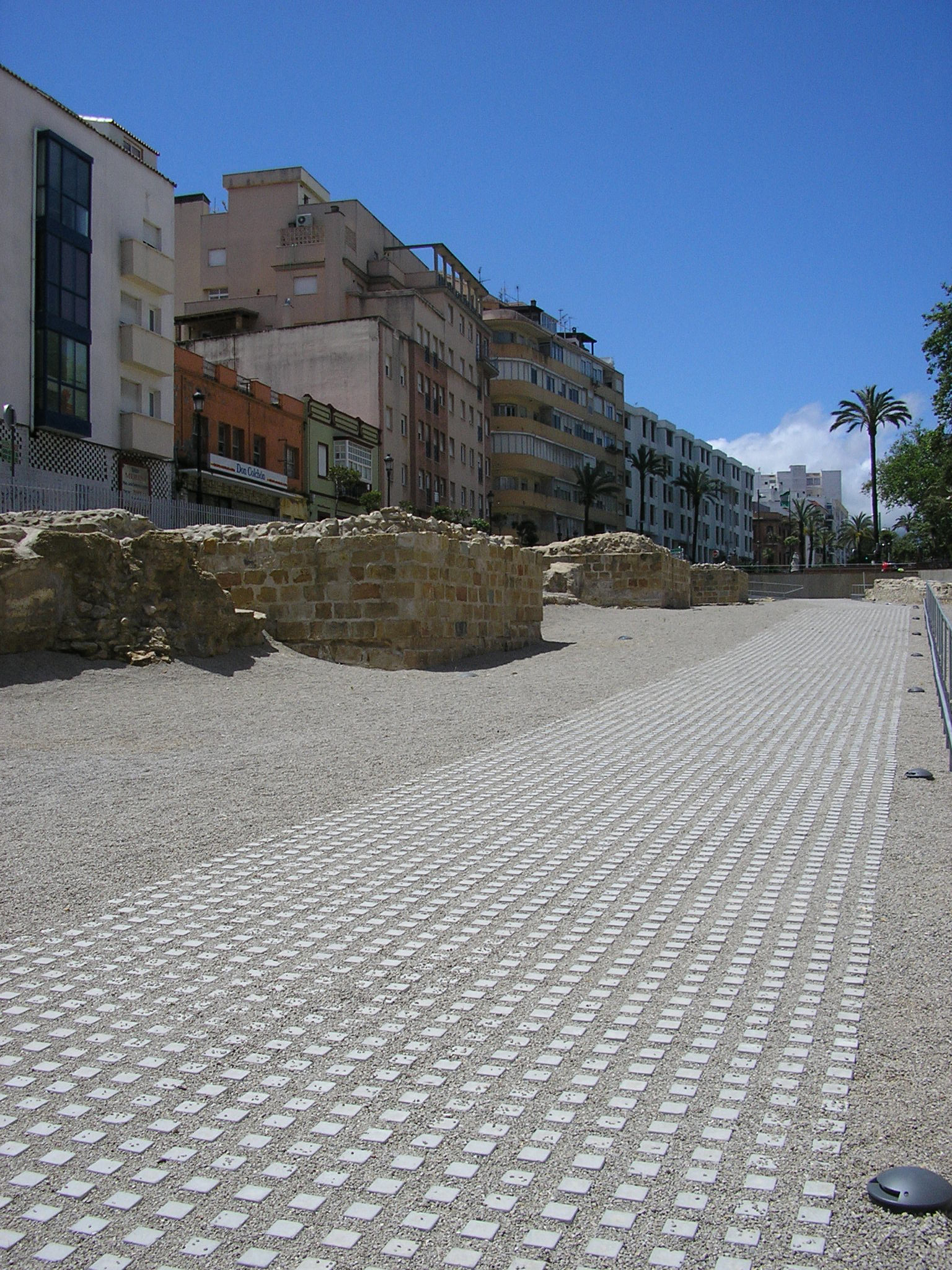

- Location within Spain
- 36.133979°N 5.447797°W
- Location: Algeciras, Spain

Spanish Cultural Heritage
- Official name: Parque Arqueológico de las Murallas Meriníes de Algeciras
- Type: Non-movable
- Criteria: Monument
- Designated: 1985
- Reference no.: RI-51-0012209

The Marinid Walls of Algeciras (Spanish: Parque Arqueológico de las Murallas Meriníes de Algeciras) are city walls located in Algeciras, Spain. The walls were declared Bien de Interés Cultural in 1985.

The dating of the walls is complicated. They were originally attributed to the Marinid period in the late 13th century, but recent epigraphic evidence published in 2012 has updated scholarly analysis, which now suggests that the archeological remains include pre-1342 Islamic constructions of uncertain date over which major reconstruction and remodeling was undertaken by the Castilians, approximately between the years 1344 and 1350, after their conquest of the city. The reconstruction was necessitated by the damage the walls suffered during the Castilian siege. When the Nasrids of Granada conquered the city in 1369, they demolished the walls and covered up the Castilian inscriptions that recorded their occupation of the city.

The remains also include a gate known as the Puerta de Gibraltar (Gibraltar Gate) or Puerta del Fonsario (Fonsario Gate). When the Castilian masons rebuilt the gate, it appears they largely followed their Islamic-era outline, building square towers typical of that style. A bridge giving access to the gate over the moat is also decorated along its sides with interlacing brickwork circles, which resemble a Mudéjar pattern also seen in the Courtyard of the Maidens in the Mudéjar section of the Alcázar of Seville (14th century).
