= Parque de las Acacias de Algeciras =

Coordinates: 36°07′29″N 5°26′42″W

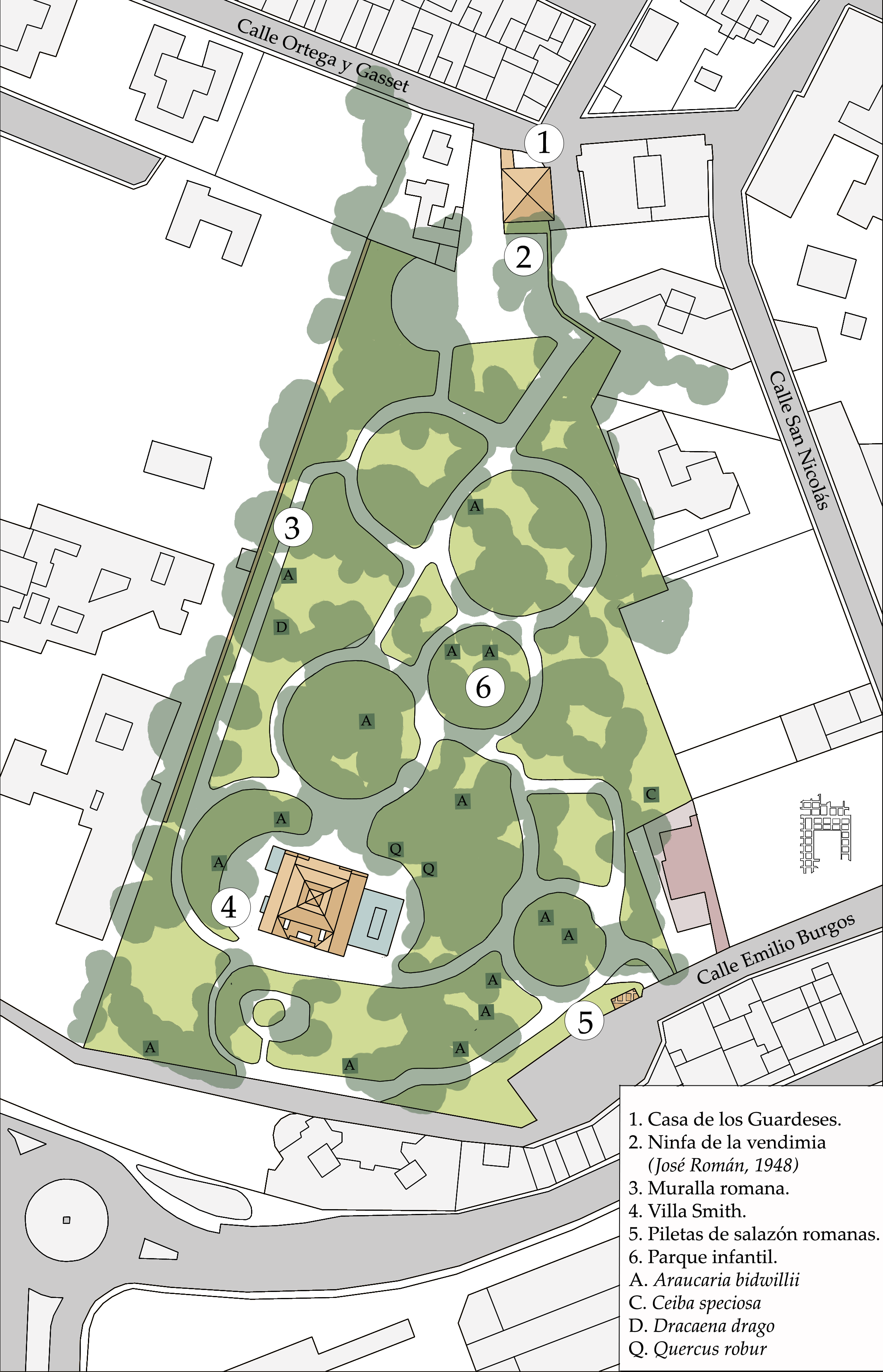

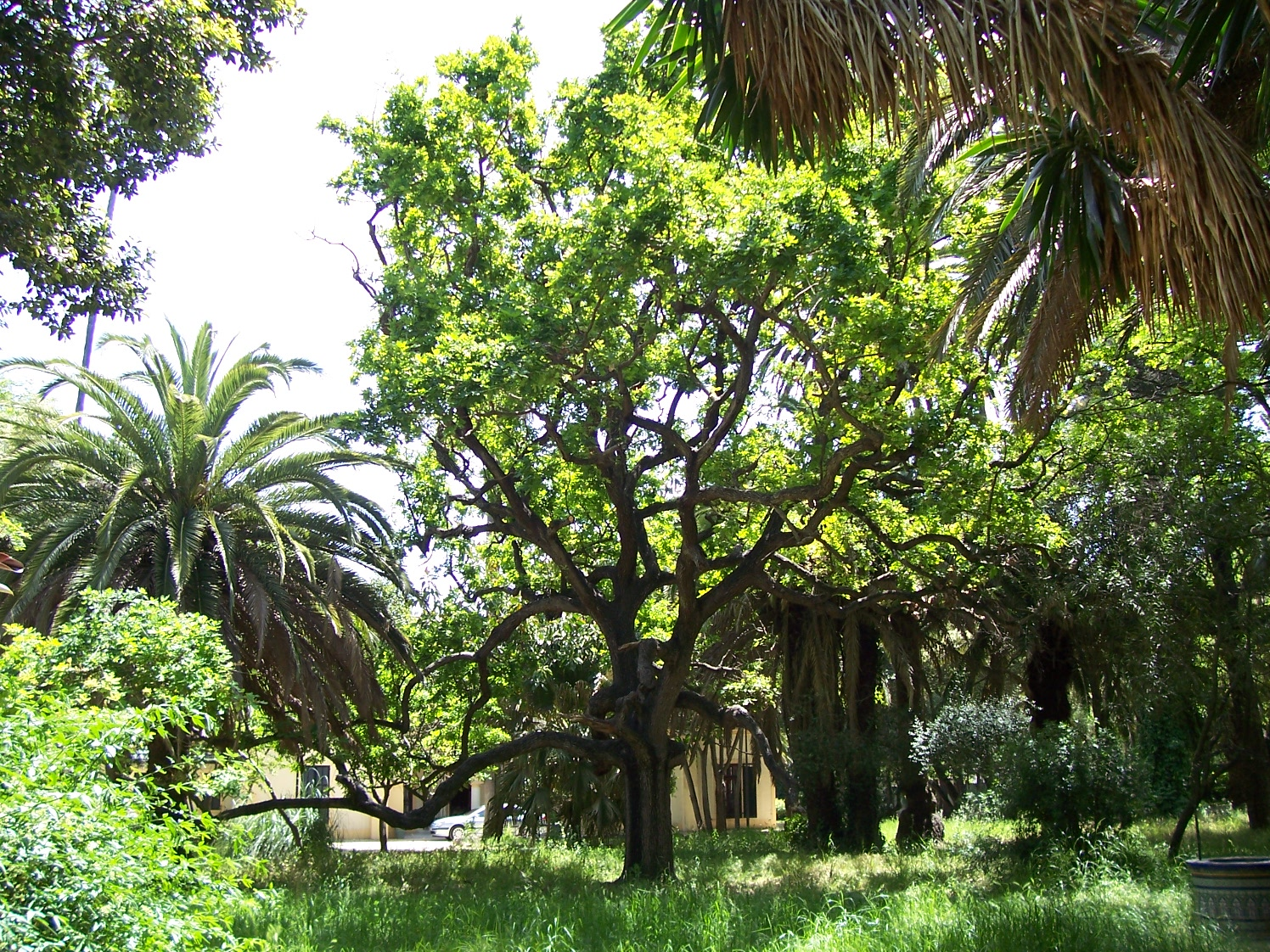

Parque de las Acacias de Algeciras is a park in Algeciras, southeastern Spain. Established in 1975, it covers an area of 19,300 square metres (208,000 sq ft). The Museo municipal de Algeciras lies to the north and Villa Smith lies in the southern part of the park. The historic Hotel Reina Cristina overlooks the park on its western side.
