= Capilla del Cristo de la Alameda (Algeciras) =

Church building in Cádiz Province, Spain

Coordinates: 36°07′36″N 5°26′46″W

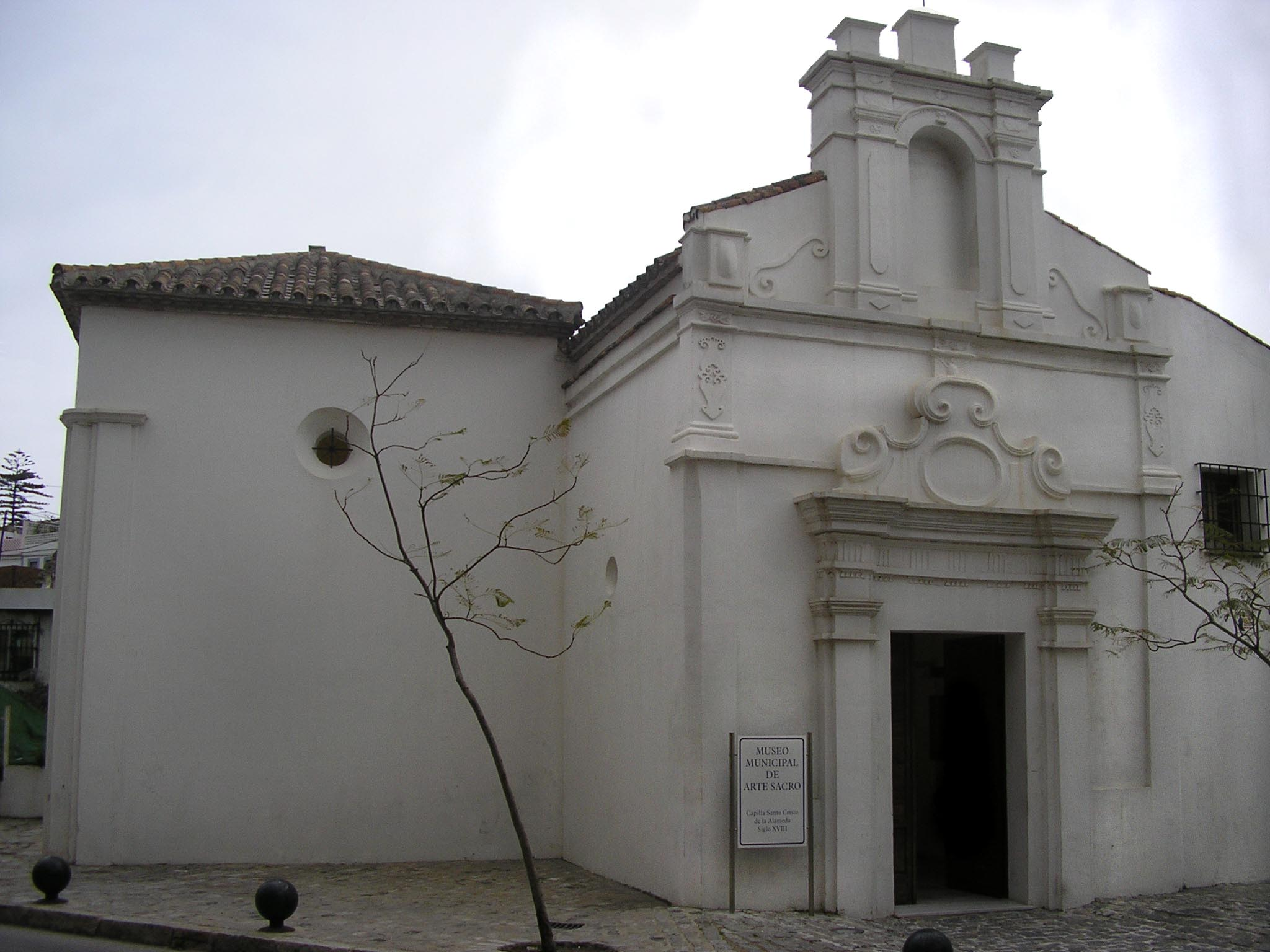

Capilla del Cristo de la Alameda is a chapel in Algeciras, Spain. It was built in 1776 at the initiative of the priest Domingo Perez. The building was then situated along one of Algeciras's main streets of the time, Calle Alameda, and was attended by many sailors entering the port. In 1931 the church was assaulted and in subsequent years was converted into a storehouse and then an auto repair shop until the late 1990s when the city recovered it and it became the headquarters of the Municipal Museum of Sacred Art. The chapel consists of a single room and a small sacristy, and has a Baroque gabled facade.

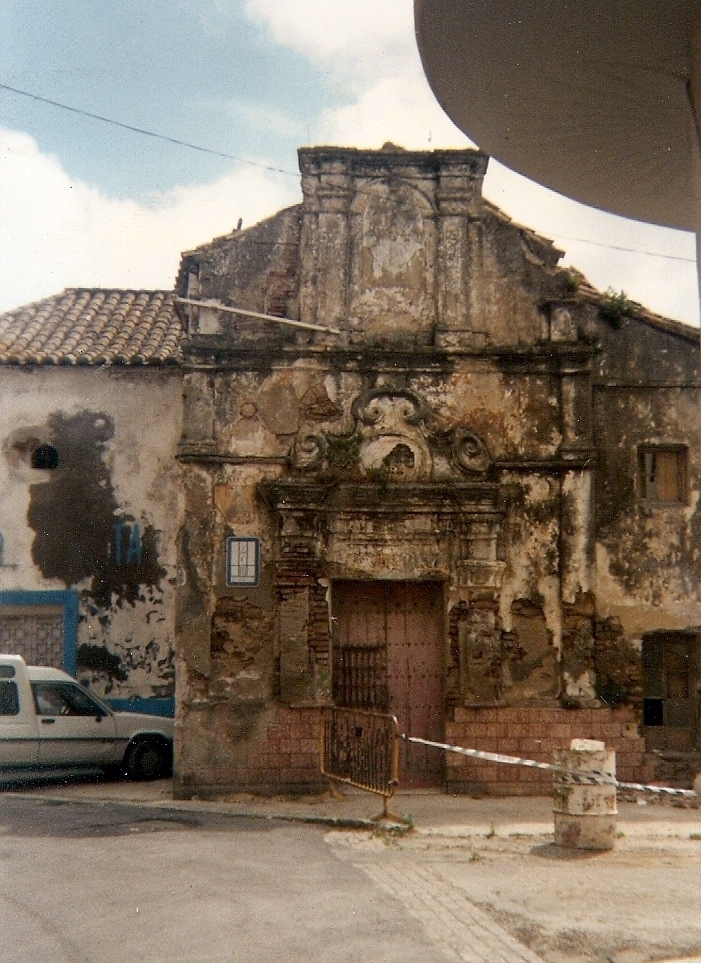
The chapel as an auto repair shop in the 1990s
