= Playa del Barranco =

Beach in Spain

Coordinates: 36°08′42″N 5°26′44″W

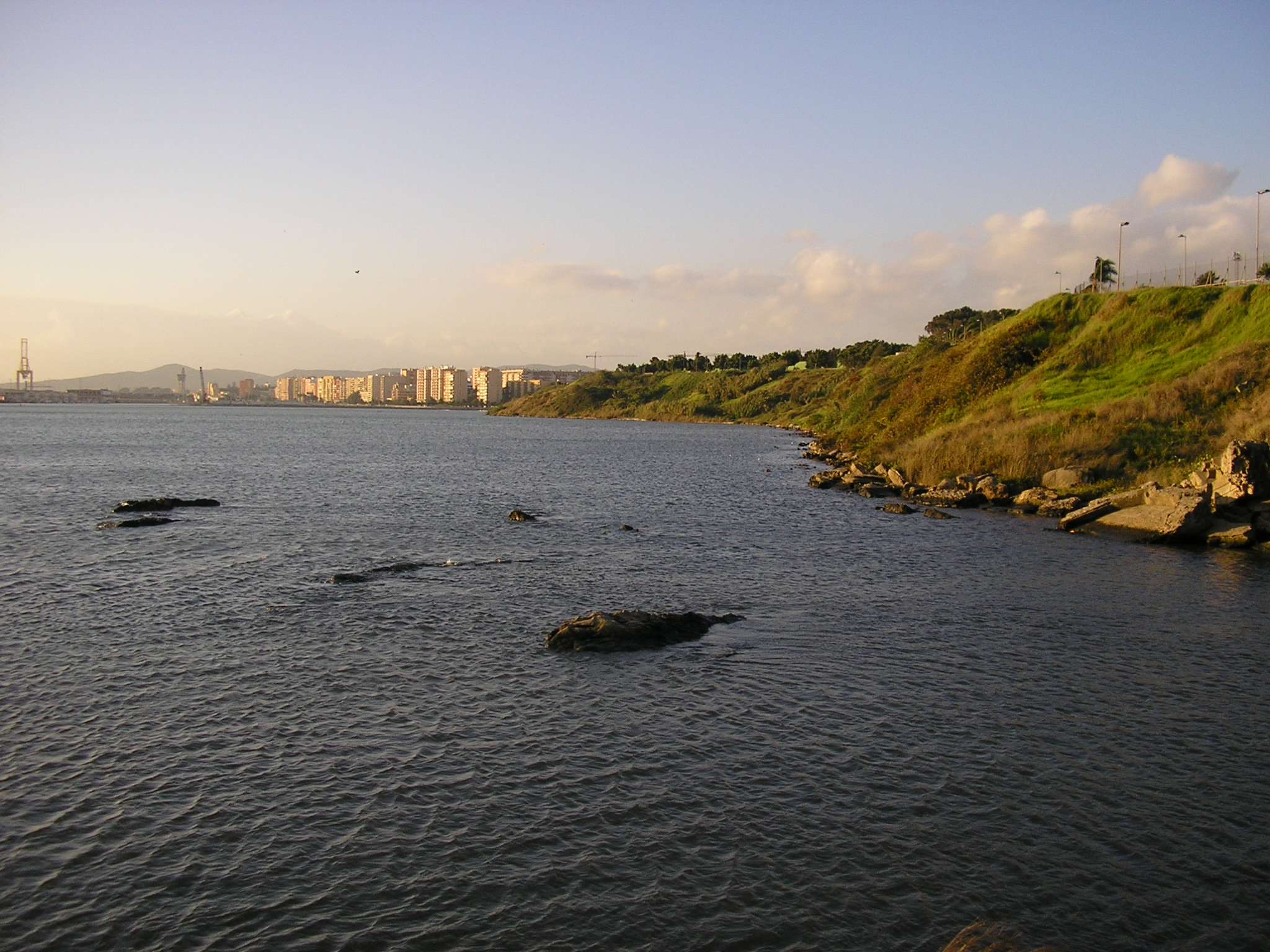

Playa del Barranco is a beach in the municipality of Algeciras, southeastern Spain. It overlooks the Bay of Algeciras. It is approximately 500 metres in length. To the north is the Playa de El Rinconcillo.
