= Tower of Botafuegos =

- Torre de Botafuegos (Spanish)
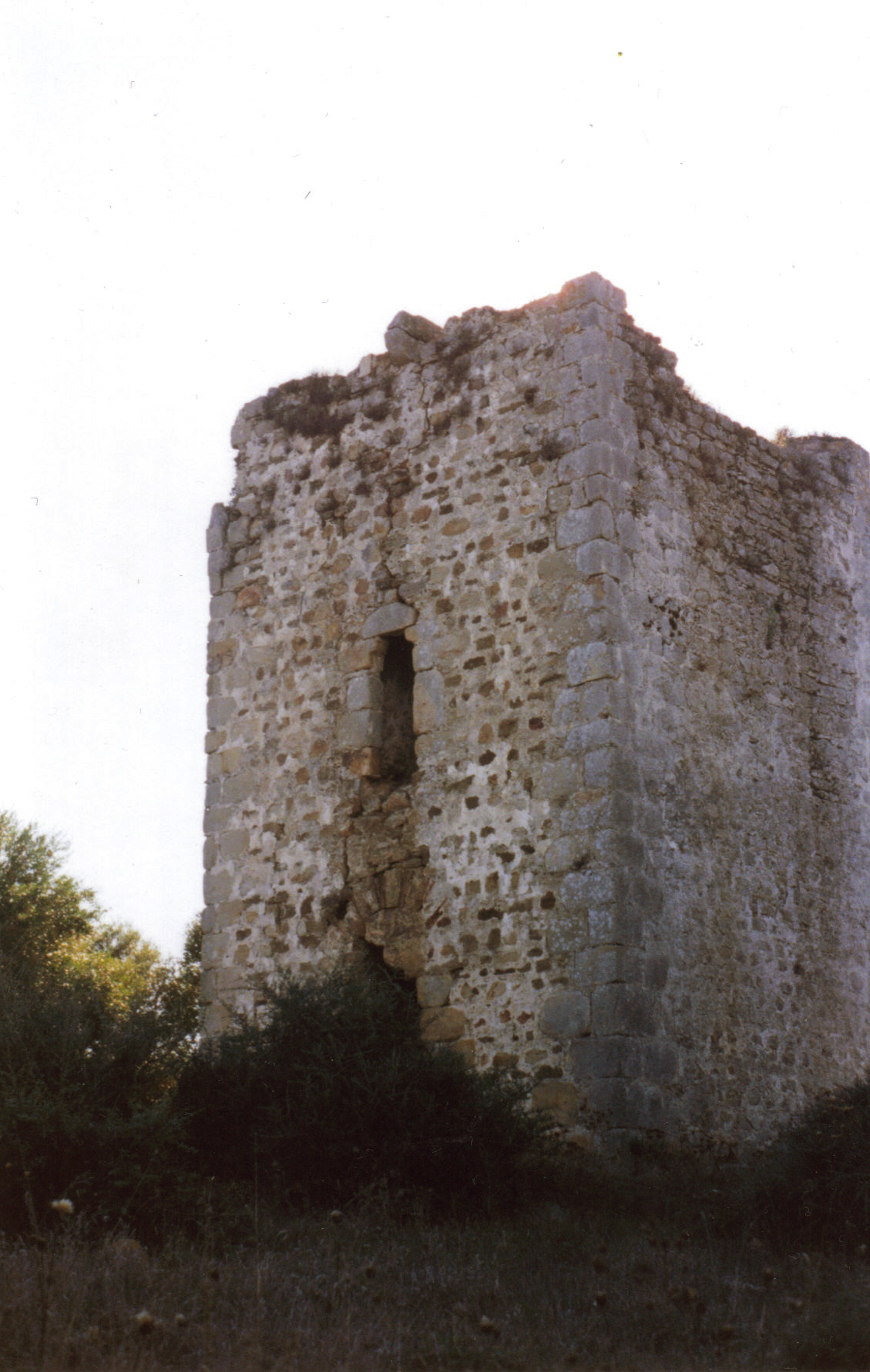

- Location within Spain
- 36.159089°N 5.494514°W
- Location: Los Barrios, Spain

Spanish Cultural Heritage
- Official name: Torre de Botafuegos
- Type: Non-movable
- Criteria: Monument
- Designated: 1993
- Reference no.: RI-51-0007599

The Tower of Botafuegos (Spanish: Torre de Botafuegos) is an Arab watchtower built sometime in the 14th century located in Los Barrios, Spain. It was part of the system of fortifications present in the Strait of Gibraltar. It is located on the so-called Monte de la Torre, in the municipality of Los Barrios, Cádiz, 120 meters above sea level, next to the Botafuegos stream, a tributary of the Palmones River, and the Prior stream, which forms a reservoir at its base. The tower is situated approximately 15 kilometers from the coast, monitoring the route connecting the cities of Al-Yazirat Al-Hadra and Medina Sidonia, as well as the route known as La Trocha, which linked Al-Yazirat Al-Hadra with Tarifa. It maintained visual contact with the Adalides tower, which in turn was linked to Algeciras, thus ensuring communication between the interior and the coast. There are hardly any written references to this tower prior to the 19th century, with the exception of a reference by King Alfonso XI of Castile who, during the siege of the city of Algeciras, mentions a watchtower on Prior hill, which takes its name from the Prior of the Order of Saint John of Jerusalem who participated in the Castilian king's campaign; presumably, being the Tower of Botafuegos.

The tower has a square floor plan, six meters on each side. Access to the building is through a ground-level doorway with a blind horseshoe arch, a clear difference from other watchtowers of the same period that had access on the second floor to prevent entry once the ladder was lowered. Above the doorway is a narrow opening that allows communication between the first floor of the tower and the outside. Both the first and upper floors have vaulted ceilings; communication between the two floors is via an internal staircase. The exterior wall of the tower is approximately 180 centimeters thick and is composed of courses of sandstone masonry with mortar and ashlar blocks at the corners. It is unknown whether the tower was crenellated, as the crenellation has been completely lost.

Currently, this tower is in relatively good condition, although it is located on private land. The surrounding land belongs to the Larios family and includes an estate called Almoguera. The loss of part of the door lintel has created a large groove running the length of the façade, threatening to eventually split it in two. Furthermore, the site is a popular destination for weekend excursions, and numerous graffiti and removals of material from the tower have altered its appearance.
