= Torre del Almirante =

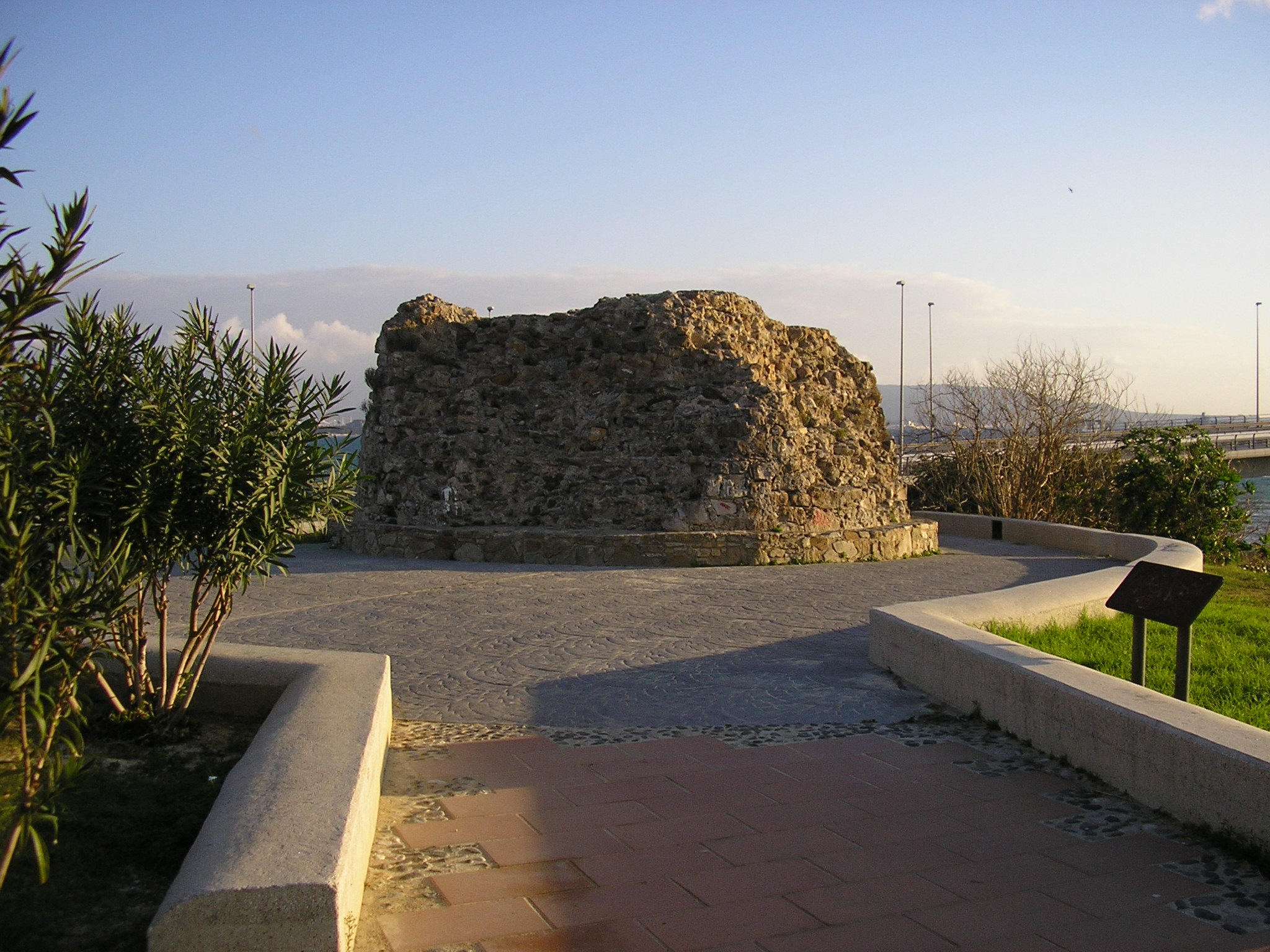

- Location within Spain
- 36.148925°N 5.445374°W
- Location: Algeciras, Spain

Spanish Cultural Heritage
- Official name: Torre del Almirante
- Type: Non-movable
- Criteria: Monument
- Designated: 1985
- Reference no.: RI-51-0011396

Torre del Almirante (English: Tower of the Admiral) is a tower located in Algeciras, Spain. It was declared Bien de Interés Cultural in 1985.

The "Torre del Almirante" is a large tower with a circular base of 6 m in diameter and a solid foundation. It was constructed from masonry held together with lime mortar, which has endowed it with exceptional strength.

The date of this tower is unknown and it pre-dates many other towers that were built around the Bay of Gibraltar and south of Algeciras as batteries and watchtowers. This tower was used by the Admiral Egidio Boccanegra in the 14th century during the Siege of Algeciras (1342-1344). The tower appears on a map of 1608 and it was improved after 1704 following the Capture of Gibraltar when the enclave was seen as a potential beachhead for British forces. The tower was put to good use during the Battle of Algeciras in 1801. The tower was then the base for four 24-pounder guns which guarded the northern approach to Algeciras. The tower was used for machine guns during the 20th century.

The ruins are now integrated into the park known as Paseo Cornisa.
