= List of museums in the province of Cádiz =

This is a list of museums in the province of Cádiz in southern Spain. According to the Ministry of Culture, there are 22 museums in the province.

== Museums in the province of Cádiz ==
| Name | Location | Type | Summary | Image |
|---|---|---|---|---|
| Museo Municipal de Algeciras | Algeciras; 36.124786°N 5.445706°W | Archaeology | | |
| Museo de Cádiz | Cádiz; 36.53508°N 6.296546°W | General | | |
| Museo de Chiclana | Chiclana de la Frontera; 36.417574°N 6.146516°W | History | | |
| Casa Museo Pedro Muñoz Seca | El Puerto de Santa María | House | | |
| Museo Arqueológico Municipal de El Puerto de Santa María | El Puerto de Santa María; 36.59925°N 6.228656°W | Archaeology | | |
| Museo Fundación Rafael Alberti | El Puerto de Santa María; 36.598169°N 6.228221°W | House | | |
| Museo Arqueológico de Espera | Espera | Archaeology | | |
| Museo Arqueológico Municipal de Jerez de la Frontera | Jerez de la Frontera; 36.684936°N 6.144837°W | Archaeology | | |
| Museo de Arte Ecuestre | Jerez de la Frontera; 36.692709°N 6.136917°W | Other | | |
| Museo del Belén | Jerez de la Frontera | Other | | |
| Museo del Enganche | Jerez de la Frontera; 36.691573°N 6.139181°W | Other | | |
| Museo del Traje Andaluz | Jerez de la Frontera | Other | | |
| Museos de la Atalaya | Jerez de la Frontera | Other | | |
| Museo Cruz Herrera | La Línea de la Concepción | Contemporary Art | | |
| La Frontera y los Castillos | Olvera | History | | |
| Museo Histórico El Dique | Puerto Real | Other | | |
| Museo Ruiz-Mateos | Rota; 36.620341°N 6.358569°W | Contemporary Art | | |
| Museo Histórico Municipal de San Fernando | San Fernando; 36.466376°N 6.195158°W | History | | |
| Museo Municipal de San Roque | San Roque | General | | |
| Conjunto Arqueológico de Baelo Claudia | Tarifa; 36.089737°N 5.774841°W | Other | | |
| Fundación NMAC-Montenmedio de Arte Contemporáneo | Vejer de la Frontera | Contemporary Art | | |
| Museo Histórico Municipal de Villamartín | Villamartín | History | | |

== See also ==
- List of museums in Andalusia
- List of museums in Málaga
- List of museums in Spain
- Province of Cádiz
