= List of museums in the province of Almería =

This is a list of museums in the province of Almería. According to the Ministry of Culture, there are 8 museums in the province of Almería.

== Museums in the province of Almería ==
Name	Location	Type	Summary	Image
Museo de Almería	Almería; 36.838333°N 2.455417°W	Archaeology		
Centro Andaluz de la Fotografía	Almería; 36.836943°N 2.467502°W	Photography		
Museo Pedro Gilabert	Arboleas; 37.351891°N 2.07507°W	Contemporary Art		
Museo Antonio Manuel Campoy	Cuevas del Almanzora; 37.297145°N 1.882332°W	Contemporary Art		Interior of the museum
Museo Casa Ibáñez	Olula del Río	Fine Arts		
Museo Histórico Municipal de Terque	Terque	History		
Museo Comarcal Velezano Miguel Guirao	Vélez-Rubio; 37.648898°N 2.076151°W	Archaeology		interior of the museum
Museo de Arte Doña Pakyta	Almería; 36.500691°N 2.274752°W	Photography		

== See also ==
- List of museums in Andalusia
- List of museums in Spain
- Province of Almería
