= List of museums in Andalusia =

According to the Ministry of Culture, there are 186 museums in Andalusia.

== Province of Almería ==
Name	Location	Type	Summary	Image
Museo de Almería	Almería; 36.838333°N 2.455417°W	Archaeology		
Centro Andaluz de la Fotografía	Almería; 36.836943°N 2.467502°W	Photography		
Museo Pedro Gilabert	Arboleas; 37.351891°N 2.07507°W	Contemporary Art		
Museo Antonio Manuel Campoy	Cuevas del Almanzora; 37.297145°N 1.882332°W	Contemporary Art		Interior of the museum
Museo Casa Ibáñez	Olula del Río	Fine Arts		
Museo Histórico Municipal de Terque	Terque	History		
Museo Comarcal Velezano Miguel Guirao	Vélez-Rubio; 37.648898°N 2.076151°W	Archaeology		interior of the museum
Museo de Arte Doña Pakyta	Almería; 36.500691°N 2.274752°W	Photography		

== Province of Cádiz ==
Name	Location	Type	Summary	Image
Museo Municipal de Algeciras	Algeciras; 36.124786°N 5.445706°W	Archaeology		
Museo de Cádiz	Cádiz; 36.53508°N 6.296546°W	General		
Museo de Chiclana	Chiclana de la Frontera; 36.417574°N 6.146516°W	History		
Casa Museo Pedro Muñoz Seca	El Puerto de Santa María	House		
Museo Arqueológico Municipal de El Puerto de Santa María	El Puerto de Santa María; 36.59925°N 6.228656°W	Archaeology		
Museo Fundación Rafael Alberti	El Puerto de Santa María; 36.598169°N 6.228221°W	House		
Museo Arqueológico de Espera	Espera	Archaeology		
Museo Arqueológico Municipal de Jerez de la Frontera	Jerez de la Frontera; 36.684936°N 6.144837°W	Archaeology		
Museo de Arte Ecuestre	Jerez de la Frontera; 36.692709°N 6.136917°W	Other		
Museo del Belén	Jerez de la Frontera	Other		
Museo del Enganche	Jerez de la Frontera; 36.691573°N 6.139181°W	Other		
Museo del Traje Andaluz	Jerez de la Frontera	Other		
Museos de la Atalaya	Jerez de la Frontera	Other		
Museo Cruz Herrera	La Línea de la Concepción	Contemporary Art		
La Frontera y los Castillos	Olvera	History		
Museo Histórico El Dique	Puerto Real	Other		
Museo Ruiz-Mateos	Rota; 36.620341°N 6.358569°W	Contemporary Art		
Museo Histórico Municipal de San Fernando	San Fernando; 36.466376°N 6.195158°W	History		
Museo Municipal de San Roque	San Roque	General		
Conjunto Arqueológico de Baelo Claudia	Tarifa; 36.089737°N 5.774841°W	Other		
Fundación NMAC-Montenmedio de Arte Contemporáneo	Vejer de la Frontera	Contemporary Art		
Museo Histórico Municipal de Villamartín	Villamartín	History		

== Province of Córdoba ==
- Fine Arts Museum of Córdoba

== See also ==
- List of museums in Spain
- Andalusia
