= List of museums in Spain =

This is a list of museums in Spain. According to the Ministry of Culture, there are about 1,500 museums in Spain.

== Andalusia ==
=== Province of Cádiz ===
- Casa Pinillos
- Casa de la Contaduría
- Casa del Terror y lo Fantástico Cádiz Oculto
- Museum of Cadiz
- Museo Arqueológico Municipal de Jerez de la Frontera
- Museo Arqueológico Municipal de El Puerto de Santa María
- Museo Fundación Rafael Alberti
- Museo Histórico Municipal de San Fernando
- Museo de Las Cortes de Cadiz
- Museo Naval de San Fernando
- Museo del Titere
- Museo Taller Litográfico
- Fundación NMAC-Montenmedio Arte Contemporáneo de Vejer de la Frontera
- Yacimiento Arqueológico Gadir

=== Province of Córdoba ===
- Al Iksir - Museo de la Alquimia
- Archaeological Museum of Córdoba
- Bullfighting Museum of Cordoba
- Casa del Agua
- Casa de Sefarad
- Casa-Museo del Guadamecí Omeya
- Centro de Flamenco Fosforito
- Centro de Creación Contemporánea
- Centro De Arte Contemporaneo Rafael Boti
- La Casa Andalusí
- Museum of Fine Arts of Córdoba
- Museo Julio Romero de Torres de Córdoba
- Museo Torre de la Calahorra de Córdoba
- Palacio de los Paez de Castillejos

=== Province of Granada ===
- Archaeological Museum of Granada
- Museo de Bellas Artes de Granada
- Museo Cuevas del Sacromonte
- Carmen de Los Geranios - Casa Museo De Max Moreau
- Casa Museo Federico García Lorca de Granada
- Casa Museo de Manuel de Falla de Granada
- Casa de Zafra
- Centro Cultural Gran Capitan
- Centro José Guerrero
- Judería de Granada
- Museo Parque de las Ciencias de Granada
- Museo de la Alhambra
- Museo de Casa de los Tiros
- Museo Etnológico de la Mujer Gitana
- Museo San Juan de Dios
- Museo Sefardí
- Museo de La Zambra - Cueva de Curro
- Palacio de los Olvidados

=== Province of Huelva ===
- Martin Alonso Pinzon House Museum
- Museo de Huelva
- Centro de Arte Moderno y Contemporáneo Daniel Vázquez Díaz de Nerva
- Centro de la Comunicación Jesús Hermida

=== Province of Jaén ===
- Museo de Jaén
- Museo de Artes y Costumbres del alto Guadalquivir
- Archaeological Museum of Úbeda
- Archaeological Museum of Linares

=== Province of Málaga ===
- Classroom of the Sea Museum Alborania (Aula del Mar.)
- Colección del Museo Ruso
- Flamenco Museum / Peña Juan Breva
- Museo Automovilístico de Málaga
- Museo de la imaginación
- Museo de Málaga
- Museo Picasso Málaga
- Museo Revello de Toro
- Museo del Vidrio y Cristal de Málaga
- Museo del Vino-Málaga
- Carmen Thyssen Museum
- CAC Málaga
- Museum Jorge Rando
- Centre Georges Pompidou Málaga
- Museo del Grabado Español Contemporáneo de Marbella
- Fundación Picasso
- Principia Science Center
- Interactive Music Museum
- Museo del Patrimonio Municipal

=== Province of Seville ===
- Antiquarium
- Casa de la Ciencia
- Casa de Murillo
- Centro Andaluz de Arte Contemporáneo
- Centro Cerámica Triana
- House Fabiola-Mariano Bellver Donation
- Military Historical Museum of Seville
- Monastery of Santa Maria de las Cuevas
- Museum of Fine Arts of Seville (Museo Bellas Artes de Sevilla)
- Museo de Artes y Costumbres Populares de Sevilla
- Museo del Baile Flamenco
- Archeological Museum of Seville
- Municipal History Museum of Écija (Museo Histórico Municipal de Écija)
- Museum of Popular Arts and Traditions
- Naval Museum Torre Del Oro
- Palacio de la Condesa de Lebrija
- Palacio de las Dueñas
- Palacio Marqueses de la Algaba
- Real Academia de Bellas Artes de Santa Isabel de Hungría
- Fundación FOCUS y Centro Velázquez. Seville.

== Aragon ==
- Aljafería (Zaragoza)
- Alma Mater Museum
- Casa Palacio de los Condes de Bureta
- Centro de Historias
- Charterhouse of Aula Dei (Zaragoza)
- Drawing Museum Castle Larrés July Gavín
- Dinopolis
- Escuela Museo de Origami Zaragoza
- Huesca Museum
- IAACC Pablo Serrano
- La Seo de Zaragoza
- La Era De Vicen
- Mausoleum of the Amantes
- Museo Aquagraria
- Museo Angel Oresanz y Artes de Serrablo
- Museo de Calatayud
- Museo Diocesano de Jaca
- Museo de los Faroles y Rosario de Cristal
- Museo del Foro de Caesaraugusta
- Museo del Fuego y de los Bomberos
- Museo Gonzalvo
- Museo Goya - Colección Ibercaja - Museo Camón Aznar (Zaragoza)
- Museo del Grabado de Goya
- Museo De Juegos Tradicionales
- Museo Juan Cabré
- Museo de Historia y Tradición de Graus
- Museum of Military Miniatures
- Museo de las Momias de Quinto
- Museo Diocesano Barbastro-Monzón
- Museo de la Mina de Mequinenza
- Museo Minero Andorra "MWINAS"
- Museo Minero de Escucha
- Museo naturalista 'La Casa de los Buitres'
- Museo Pablo Gargallo
- Museo Pedagógico de Aragón
- Museo del Puerto Fluvial de Caesaraugusta
- El Museo Salvador Victoria
- Museo Paleontológico de Galve
- Museo de las Termas Públicas de Caesaraugusta
- Museo del Teatro de Caesaraugusta
- Provincial Museum of Teruel
- San Pablo (Zaragoza)
- Tapestry Museum
- Híjar Synagogue
- Zaragoza Museum

== Principality of Asturias ==
- Alfercam Museum
- Archaeological Museum of Asturias
- Asturias Gold Museum
- Black Pottery Museum
- Bowling Museum of Asturias
- Casa de la Apicultura
- Castillo de Salas (castle)
- Centro Niemeyer
- Cider Museum
- Ethnographic Museum of Dairy
- Ethnographic Museum of Grandas de Salime
- Ethnographic Museums Network of Asturias
- Museum of Fine Arts of Asturias
- Gijón Railway Museum
- International Bagpipe Museum
- Juan Barjola Museum of Painting
- Jurassic Museum of Asturias
- LABoral Centro de Arte y Creación Industrial
- Mazonovo
- Mining Museum of Asturias
- Museum of Avilés Urban History
- Museum of the Asturian People
- Philippe Cousteau Anchor Museum
- Pinacoteca Eduardo Úrculo
- Sacred Art Museum of Tineo
- Museum of the Siderurgy
- Universidad Laboral de Gijón

== Balearic Islands ==
- Casa Museu Dionís Bennàssar
- Casa Museo Els Calderers
- Es Baluard
- Gran Hotel (Palma)
- Frédéric Chopin and George Sand Museum
- Fundació Pilar i Joan Miró in Mallorca
- Museu Arqueològic de Son Fornés
- Museu Balear de Ciències Naturals
- Museu d’Història de Manacor
- Museo Histórico Militar de San Carlos
- Museu La Granja d'Esporles
- Museum of Mallorca
- Museo de Menorca
- Puig des Molins
- Royal Palace of La Almudaina

== Basque Country ==
- Arkeologi Museoa Bilbao
- Arms Industry Museum of Eibar
- Arrantzaleen Museoa
- Artziniega’s Ethnographic Museum
- Artium Museum
- Ataria
- Basque Railway Museum
- Basque Museum of the History of Medicine and Science
- Bilbao Fine Arts Museum
- Centro de Interpretación Santurtzi Itsasoa
- Chillida-Leku
- La Encartada Fabrika-Museoa
- Eureka! Zientzia Museoa
- Euskal Herria Museoa
- Euskal Itsas Museoa - Museo Marítimo Vasco
- Guggenheim Museum Bilbao
- Itsasmuseum Bilbao
- Kurutzesantu Museum
- Maritime Museum Ria de Bilbao
- Museo de Bellas Artes de Álava
- Museum Cemento Rezola
- Museo de Ciencias Naturales de Álava
- Museo Cristóbal Balenciaga
- Museo Diocesano de Arte Sacro de Álava
- Museo Ferrería El Pobal
- Museum of Fournier de Naipes
- Museo de la Paz de Guernica
- Museo de Los Faroles
- Museo de la Minería del País Vasco
- Museo de Fotografía y Cine
- Museo Pasos de Semana Santa
- Musée Basque
- Museo Zumalakarregi
- Reproductions Museum Bilbao
- Rialia Museum
- San Telmo Museum
- Sagardoetxea - Museo de la Sidra Vasca
- TOPIC - Museo y Centro Internacional de la Marioneta de Tolosa
- Torre Loizaga

== Canary Islands ==
=== Lanzarote ===
- Casa Museo del Timple
- Casa Museo Palacio Spínola
- Castillo de San Gabriel: Museo de Historia de Arrecife
- Castillo de San José: International Museum of Art
- Museo de Aloe de Lanzarote
- Museo Arqueológico de Lanzarote
- Museo Atlántico Lanzarote
- Museo Aeronáutico del Aeropuerto de Lanzarote
- Museo Etnografico Tanit
- Museo el Grifo
- Museo Internacional de Arte Contemporáneo, MIAC
- Museo Lagomar

=== Tenerife ===
- Archaeological Museum of Puerto de la Cruz
- ARTlandya - la Finca, el Mundo Muñecas
- Casa de los Balcones
- Casa del Carnaval
- Casa del Vino
- Castle of San Cristóbal (Santa Cruz de Tenerife)
- Centro Alfarero y Museo Etnográfico Cha Domitila
- Centro de Fotografía Isla de Tenerife
- Fundación Cristino de Vera-Espacio Cultural CajaCanarias
- Historical Military Museum of the Canary Islands
- Latin American Craft Museum of Tenerife
- Museo de Antropología de Tenerife
- Museo de Arte Sacro El Tesoro De La Concepción
- Museo Casa de El Capitán
- Museum of Contemporary Art Eduardo Westerdahl (Macew)
- Museo de la Naturaleza y Arqueología
- Museo Municipal de Bellas Artes de Santa Cruz de Tenerife
- Museo del Pescador
- Museum of Science and the Cosmos
- Museum of the History of Tenerife
- Sede Casa de Carta
- Tenerife Espacio de las Artes

=== Gran Canaria ===
- Arucas Municipal Museum
- Atlantic Center of Modern Art
- Casa de Colón
- Casa-Museo Antonio Padrón
- Casa-Museo León y Castillo
- Casa-Museo Pérez Galdós
- Casa-Museo Tomás Morales
- Centro de Arte La Regenta
- Cueva Pintada Museum and Archaeological Park
- Elder Museum of Science and Technology
- Museo Canario
- Museo Castillo de Mata
- Museo Diocesano de Arte Sacro de Las Palmas de Gran Canaria
- Museo Etnográfico Casas Cuevas de Artenara
- Museo Naval
- Museo Néstor
- Museo La Zafra
- Painted Cave, Galdar
- Perez Galdos House Museum

=== La Palma ===
- Archaeological Museum Benahoarita
- Casa de La Cultura de Santo Domingo
- Museo Arqueológico Benahoarita
- Museo la Casa Roja
- Museo de Interpretación del Gofio
- Museo Naval - Barco de la Virgen
- Museo del Puro Palmero
- Museo de la Seda Las Hilanderas
- Naval Museum

=== La Gomera ===
- Casa Bencomo Biblioteca Insular
- Casa de Colón
- Centro de Interpretación - Las Loceras
- Casa de la Miel de Palma
- Museo La Alameda
- Museo Arqueológico de La Gomera
- Museo Etnográfico de La Gomera

== Cantabria ==
- Cades Ferreria
- Casa de las Doñas
- Centro Botín
- Centro de Interpretación de la ciudad de Santander
- Centro de Interpretación del Hombre Pez
- Ecomuseum Fluviarium of Liérganes
- El Capricho
- Finca del Marques de Valdecilla
- Monastery of Santo Toribio de Liébana
- Muralla de Santander
- Museum of Prehistory and Archaeology of Cantabria
- Museum of the Royal Artillery Factory
- Museum of Torture - Inquisicion
- Museo de Las Amas de Cría Pasiegas
- Museo del Barquillero
- Museo de la Campana
- Museo de la Cantería "Rodrigo Gil de Hontañón"
- Muelle de las Carabelas
- Museo Etnográfico de Cantabria
- Museo Etnográfico de Joaquín Sáinz de Rozas
- Museo De Las Tres Villas Pasiegas
- Museo Marítimo del Cantábrico
- Museo De La Naturaleza De Cantabria
- Museo De La Vijanera
- National Museum and Research Center of Altamira
- Observatorio del Arte
- Regina Coeli Diocesan Museum
- Santa Olaja mill

== Castile-La Mancha ==
- Albacete Police Museum
- Albacete Provincial Museum
- Antonio Pérez Foundation Museum
- Army Museum
- Artesanía Burgueño
- Archivo-Museo Sánchez Mejías
- Casa Bellomonte
- Ceramics Museum Ruiz de Luna
- Cueva de Medrano
- El Greco Museum, Toledo
- El Pozo los Lagartos
- Espacio Torner
- Museo de la Acuarela Rafael Requena
- Museo Antonio López
- Museo de Arte Abstracto Español
- Museo de Arte Contemporáneo Infanta Elena
- Museo-Casa de Dulcinea del Toboso
- Museo del Carro y Aperos de Labranza
- Museo Cervantino
- Museo de Ciudad Real
- Museo Comarcal de Daimiel
- Museo del Ejército
- Museo Elisa Cendrero
- Museo de Guadalajara
- Museo del Hidalgo
- Museo de Humor Grafico de Dulcinea
- Museo de los Concilios y la Cultura Visigoda
- Museo Manuel Piña
- Museo de Miniaturas Profesor Max
- Museo Municipal de la Cuchillería de Albacete
- Museo de la Música Pintada - CROMATICA
- Museo Paleontológico de Cuenca
- Museo Palmero
- Museo Parroquial de Tapices de Pastrana
- Museo del Queso Manchego Toledo
- Museo Santísima Trinidad
- Museo de la Semana Santa de Cuenca
- Museum of Words
- Museum of Santa Cruz
- National Theater Museum
- Palace of the Infantado
- Pintura Mural de Alarcón
- Santa María la Blanca
- Science Museum of Castilla La Mancha
- Sephardic Museum
- Spanish Abstract Art Museum
- Synagogue of El Transito
- Treasure Museum Guarrazar - Guadamur
- Provincial Museum of Ciudad Real
- Museum of Guadalajara

== Castile and León ==
- CARMUS - Museo Carmelitano Teresa de Jesús
- Casa de Cervantes
- Casa Lis
- Casa Museo de la Ribera
- Casa-Museo Satur Juanela
- Casa de Cervantes
- Casa de las Flores Museo del Juguete de Hojalata
- Castle of Burgos
- Centro de Interpretación del León Romano
- Centro Leonés de Arte
- Christopher Columbus Museum
- Convento de San José (Ávila)
- Episcopal Palace, Astorga
- Fundación Vela Zanetti
- Museum of African Art Arellano Alonso
- Museum of Automotive History
- Museo de Arte Contemporáneo de Castilla y León (León)
- Museo de Ávila
- Museum of Contemporary Spanish Art - Patio Herreriano (Valladolid)
- Museo de la Emigración Leonesa
- Museo Etnográfico de Castilla y León
- Museo del Ferrocarril
- Museo Grand Central
- Museo Herminio Revilla
- Museum of Human Evolution
- Museo de Historia de Arévalo
- Museo de la Industria Harinera de Castilla y León
- Museo de la Industria Chacinera
- Museo Industrial Textil de Béjar
- Museum of Jewellery in the Silver Way, in La Bañeza, León
- Museo de León
- Museo Liceo Egipcio
- Museo Numantino
- Museo Patio Herreriano
- Museo de la Radio
- Museo Real Casa de Moneda de Segovia
- Museo Sierra Pambley
- National Museum of Sculpture, Valladolid
- Numantine Museum of Soria
- Oriental Museum (Valladolid)
- Roman Vila de Almenara
- Royal Glass Factory of La Granja
- Royal Palace of La Granja de San Ildefonso, in La Granja de San Ildefonso, province of Segovia
- Royal Palace of Riofrío, in Riofrío, province of Segovia
- San Pedro Cultural Becerril de Campos
- Territorio Artlanza
- Valladolid Science Museum
- VRO La Olmeda
- Valladolid Museum
- Zamora Museum

== Extremadura ==
- Archaeological Museum of Badajoz
- Baluarte de San Pedro
- Cáceres Museum
- Casa del Ajimez
- Casa-Museo Árabe Yusuf Al-Burch
- Casa Museo Guayasamín de Cáceres
- Casa Museo Vasco Núñez de Balboa
- Ethnographic Museum "González Santana"
- Granite Museum
- Motorcycle Museum and Classic Car
- Museo de Arte Contemporáneo Helga de Alvear
- MUBA, Museo de Bellas Artes de Badajoz
- Museo del Automóvil
- Museo de la Cárcel Real
- Museo del Carnaval de Badajoz
- Museo Catedralicio Badajoz
- Museo de la Cereza
- Museo de las Ciencias del Vino
- Museo de la Ciudad de Badajoz "Luis de Morales
- Museo Etnográfico Textil Pérez Enciso de Plasencia
- Museo Extremeño e Iberoamericano de Arte Contemporáneo (Badajoz)
- Museo Fundación Pecharromán
- Museo Geológico y Minero de Santa Marta
- Museo de la Historia de la Medicina y la Salud de Extremadura
- Museo del Jamón de Monesterio
- Museo Papercraft Olivenza
- Museo Perez Comendador-Leroux
- Museo Taurino de Badajoz
- Museo Vostell Malpartida
- National Museum of Roman Art
- Palace los Golfines de Abajo
- Paprika Museum Jaraiz de la Vera
- Pizarro House Museum
- Santa Clara Museum

== Galicia ==
- Archiepiscopal Towers Interpretation Centre
- Barco-Museo Virgen del Carmen
- Casa de las Artes
- Casa das Ciencias
- Casa Histórica de Cambados
- Casa do Patrón Museo Etnográfico
- Cathedral Museum
- Centro Arqueológico de la Villa Romana de Toralla
- Centro Torrente Ballester CTB
- Club Naval de Ferrol
- College of Nosa Señora da Antiga
- Contemporary Art Center of Galicia
- Domus
- Domus Mitreo
- Fundación Barrié
- Fundación Curros Enríquez
- Fundación Eugenio Granell / Pazo del Marques de Bendaña
- Illa das Esculturas
- Museum of Contemporary Art, Vigo
- Museu Nacional de Ciencia e Tecnología
- Museo de Bellas Artes de Coruña
- Museo Carlos Maside
- Museo Casa de la Troya
- Museo Estrella Galicia
- Museo Etnográfico da Limia
- Museo Etnográfico Monte Caxado
- Museo de Historia Natural da SGHN
- Museo Interactivo da Historia de Lugo
- Museo Man de Camelle
- Museo do Mar de Galicia
- Museo Municipal Manuel Torres
- Museo Naval Ferrol
- Museo de Prehistoria e Arqueoloxía de Vilalba
- Museum of Pilgrimage
- Museo Provincial de Lugo
- Museo Provincial de Pontevedra - Edificio Castelao
- Museo del Pueblo Gallego
- Museo Quiñones de León
- Océano Surf Museo
- Palloza Museo Casa do Sesto
- Pazo de San Isidro
- Pazo de Tor
- Pontevedra Museum
- Pinacoteca Francisco Fernández del Riego
- Saint Anton Castle
- Sala de Exposicións Porta Miñá
- Salinae - Centro Arqueolóxico do Areal
- Spain's National Exhibition of Ship Building

== La Rioja ==
- Casa de las Ciencias
- Casa de la Imagen
- Centro de Interpretación Contrebia Leucade
- Cueva de los Cien Pilares
- Espacio Lagares
- History and Archeology Museum Najerillense
- Museo de Arte Contemporáneo de Haro El Torreón
- Museo de La Rioja
- Museo de la Romanización
- Museo Würth La Rioja
- Museo de la Verdura
- Paleontological Interpretation Center of La Rioja
- Sala Amós Salvador
- Winery - Vivanco Museum of Wine Culture

== Community of Madrid ==
Alcalá de Henares

- Regional Archaeological Museum of the Community of Madrid

Madrid

== Region of Murcia ==
- Archaeological Museum of Lorca
- Archaeological Museum of Murcia
- Arrabal de la Arrixaca
- Asociación Murciana de Amigos del Ferrocarril (AMAF)
- Centro de Visitantes Muralla de Murcia
- Centro de Visitantes de Monteagudo
- Conjunto Monumental San Juan de Dios
- La Casa del Belén
- National Museum of Subaquatic Archaeology (Cartagena)
- Museo Archicofradía De La Sangre
- Museum of the Cathedral of Murcia
- Museum of the City
- Museo de Bellas Artes de Murcia
- Museo de la Ciencia y el Agua
- Museo Hidráulico "Los Molinos del Río Segura"
- MUDEM (Museo del Enclave Muralla)
- Museo Ramón Gaya
- Museo Salzillo
- Museo de Santa Clara
- Real Casino de Murcia

== Foral Community of Navarre ==
- Amaiur Arkeologia Zentroa
- Casa Museo - Julián Gayarre - Museoetxea
- Jorge Oteiza Museum Foundation
- Las Eretas
- La Fábrica Vieja - Museo de la Conserva
- Molino de Zubieta - Zubietako Errota
- Museo Arqueológico de ANDELOS
- Museo del Carlismo
- Museo Casa Jenaro
- Museo Diocesano
- Museo de Estelas - Hilarriak
- Museo Etnografico del Reino de Pamplona
- Museo Etnológico de Navarra
- Museo -Gustavo de Maeztu- Museoa
- Museo Muñoz Sola de Arte Moderno
- Museo del Vino de Navarra
- Museum of Navarre, Pamplona
- Occidens Museum
- Parque-Museo Santxotena
- Tudela Museum
- Ultreia - Centro de Interpretación del Camino de Santiago
- University Museum of Navarra
- Witch Museum

== Valencian Community ==
- Alicante Museum of Contemporary Art
- Archaeological Museum of Alicante
- Archaeological Museum Camil Visedo
- Archaeological Museum of Gandia
- Associació Tren Alcoi Gandia
- Bombas Gens
- Casa del Arte Mayor de la Seda
- Casa de la Cultura de Bellreguard
- Casa Museo Benlliure
- Centre Cultural Sala Parpallò
- Diocesan Cathedral Museum of Valencia
- Firefighters Museum of Alcoy
- Gravina Museum of Fine Arts
- González Martí National Museum of Ceramics and Decorative Arts
- Gremio Artesano de Artistas Falleros de Valencia
- Institut Valencià d'Art Modern
- La Almoina Archaeological Museum
- The Lladró Museum
- Museum of Fine Arts of Valencia
- Museo Alcoyano de la Fiesta (MAF)
- Museo Antonio Marco Belén Y Casitas De Muñecas
- Museo de Arte Contemporáneo de Villafamés
- Museo de Belenes
- Museo y Colegio del Arte Mayor de la Seda
- Museo Valenciano de la Ilustración y la Modernidad
- Museo de Bellas Artes de Castellón
- Museu de Belles Arts de València
- Museo del Calzado
- Museo Casa de las Rocas
- Museo Casa Estudio Enrique Lledó
- Museu de les Ciències Príncipe Felipe
- Museu Escolar de Puçol
- Museo Fallero de Gandía
- Museu Faller de València
- Museu de la Impremta i de les Arts Gràfiques
- Museo Histórico Militar
- Museo del Mar de Santa Pola
- Museo Nacional de Cerámica y Artes Suntuarias González Martí
- Museo Nino Bravo
- Museo del Pan
- Museo de Soldaditos de Plomo L’Iber
- Museo Taurino
- Museo del Turrón
- Museo The Ocean Race
- Natural Science Museum of Valencia
- Orange Museum
- Palau del Marqués de Campo
- Prehistory Museum of Valencia
- Real Academia de Bellas Artes de San Carlos de Valencia
- Segrelles Museum
- Valencia History Museum
- Valencian Museum of Ethnology

== See also ==
- List of libraries in Spain
- List of archives in Spain
