= List of museums in Málaga =

This list of Museums in Málaga contains museums in both the city of Málaga, Spain and the province of Málaga, Spain.

== List ==
Spanish name	English name	Type	Reference
Museo de Málaga	Museum of Malaga	History museum, art museum	
Museo Picasso Málaga	Picasso Museum of Malaga	Art museum	
Museum Jorge Rando	Jorge Rando Museum	Art museum	
Centre Pompidou Málaga	Pompidou Center of Malaga	Art museum	
Museo Nacional de Aeropuertos y Transporte Aéreo	National Museum of Airports and Air Transport	Aerospace museum	
Centro de Arte Contemporáneo de Málaga (CAC Málaga) closed from the 8th of September 2024	Malaga Center of Contemporary Art	Art museum	
Fundación Picasso	Picasso Foundation	Art museum	
Centro de Interpretación del Castillo de Gibralfaro	Gibralfaro Castle Acting Center	Acting museum	
Museo del Patrimonio Municipal (MUPAM)	Municipal Heritage Museum	History museum	
Museo de la Archicofradía de la Esperanza	Museum of the Confraternity of Hope	Religious museum	
Colección del Museo Ruso, San Petersburgo Málaga	Collection of Saint Petersburg the Russian Museum, Málaga	Russian museum	
Museo del Vino	Wine Museum	Wine museum	
Museo Catedralicio	Cathedral museum	Religious museum	
Museo de Arte Flamenco. Peña Juan Breva	Flamenco Art Museum	Art Museum	
Pizarra Municipal Museum	Pizarra Municipal Museum	History Museum	
Benalmádena Museum	Benalmadena Museum	History museum, art museum	
Museo & Tour Málaga Club de Fútbol	Malaga Football Club Museum	Sports museum	
Museo del Vidrio y Cristal de Málaga	Glass museum of Malaga	Glass museum	
Museo Félix Revello de Toro	Felix Revello de Toro Museum	History museum	
Museo Carmen Thyssen Málaga	Carmen Thyssen Museum	Art Museum	
Ars Málaga Palacio Episcopal	Episcopal Palace of Malaga	History museum	
Museo Taurino de Málaga	Taurino Museum of Malaga	History museum	
Museo y Basílica de Santa María la Victoria	Santa Maria la Victoria Museum and Basilica	Art museum	
Casa Gerald Brenan	Gerald Brenan House	History Museum	
Centro de Ciencia	Malaga Science center	Science museum	
Museo Automovilístico y de la Moda	Automobile Museum	Automobile museum	
Museo de Artes y Costumbres Populares	Art and popular customs museum	Art museum	
Yacimientos Arqueológicos de la Araña	Archelogical museum of Malaga	Archelogocial museum	
MIMMA. Museo Interactivo de la Música de Málaga	Malaga Interactive Museum of Music	Music museum	
Centro de Interpretación Teatro Romano	Roman theater acting center	Art museum	
Museo de la Semana Santa, Museo de las Cofradías	Holy week museum	History museum	
Ecomuseo Lagar de Torrijos	Ecomuseum of Torrijos	Science museum	
Centro de Arte de la Tauromaquia	Art Center of Tauromaquia	Art museum	
Museo de la Cofradía del Santo Sepulcro	Museum of the Brotherhood of the Holy Sepulchre	Art museum	
Museo -Tesoro de la Cofradía de la Expiración	Treasure-Museum of the Brotherhood of the Expiration	Religious museum	
Museo de la Cofradía de Estudiantes	Museum of the Brotherhood of Students	History museum	
Sala de Exposiciones Arqueológicas de la Alcazaba	Archaeological Exhibition Hall of the Alcazaba	Archaeology museum	
Museo del Cautivo y la Trinidad	Museum of the Captive and the Trinity	Religious museum	
Iphergan Collection	Iphergan Collection	Archeological private collection	

== See also ==
- List of museums in Andalusia
- List of museums in Madrid
- List of museums in Barcelona
