= José Cruz Herrera =

Spanish painter (1890–1972)

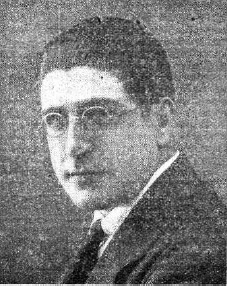
- José Cruz Herrera in 1915
- Born: 1 October 1890; La Línea de la Concepción, Spain
- Died: 11 August 1972 (aged 81); Casablanca, Morocco
- Known for: Painting

José Cruz Herrera (1 October 1890 – 11 August 1972) was a Spanish painter who concentrated principally on genre works and landscape art. He worked in Spain, Uruguay, Argentina, France and especially Morocco, where he lived for much of his life in Casablanca. Many of his works are displayed at the Museo Cruz Herrera in his home town of La Línea de la Concepción (Cádiz).

== Early years ==
Cruz Herrera's grandparents originally lived in Cádiz, where they operated a lithographic press. Their skills were in demand in British-ruled Gibraltar, where snuff was manufactured and sold in envelopes. To meet the demand for printed envelopes and packaging labels, they moved their press to Gibraltar. They were unable to live there, as it required special permission, so they settled in the Spanish-ruled town of La Línea de la Concepción on the border with Gibraltar and walked across the frontier each day to operate their press. In 1889, Cruz Herrera's father, José de la Cruz Garcia, married a local woman – 19-year-old Antonia Herrera Ramírez, the niece of La Línea's first mayor – and was himself mayor of the town for a short time. Eight months later on 1 October 1890, Cruz Herrera was born as the first of seven children and was named after his grandfather, who like his father was also named José. He was given the birthname of José Maria Remigio.

== Artistic career ==
His interest in art was kindled when he was given a box of paints during a childhood illness. He set to copying great works of classical painting by masters such as Velázquez, Murillo and Goya. His talent was soon apparent and he began formal training with the painter Juan Aciego in Cádiz. He continued his studies at the School of Fine Arts in Madrid under Cecilio Pla before being awarded a grant to study in Paris and Rome in 1915. That same year, a picture of Christ Chapel of Mercy of the Dukes of Osuna earned him a third-place medal at the National Exhibition of Fine Arts in Spain. He subsequently received several more awards at the exhibition, including distinction in 1920, a second-place medal in 1924 and a first in 1926. He also received a silver medal for his contribution to an international exhibition in Panama. He concentrated on genre works and landscapes, but he is best known as an orientalist painter, with a particular faculty for producing atmospheric depictions of scenes of everyday life in Morocco.

Cruz Herrera travelled to Montevideo in Uruguay and Buenos Aires in Argentina in 1922. He went to Morocco in 1929, where he worked in Casablanca for several years. He subsequently established a studio at Neuilly-sur-Seine, just outside Paris, and contributed to collective exhibitions in 1934, 1935 and 1936 at the Salon de la Société Nationale des Beaux-Arts. He also exhibited solo at various times and locations – Madrid, Barcelona and London in 1912, Antwerp in 1931, Casablanca in 1933, and Paris in 1934. After the end of the Spanish Civil War in 1939, he returned to Morocco. The following year Spain awarded Cruz Herrera a Knight's Cross in the Order of Isabella the Catholic, followed by a knighthood in the Civil Order of Alfonso X, the Wise in 1958. He exhibited regularly throughout the remainder of his life and in 1964 donated a large canvas portrayal of the Immaculate Conception to the parish church in La Línea. He died on 11 August 1972 in Casablanca but his remains were transferred back to La Línea to be buried there.

== Museum ==
The Museo Cruz Herrera was planned some years before he died, when in 1970 the council of La Línea agreed to open a municipal museum of painting dedicated to the painter. It was opened on 6 April 1975, located on the central Plaza de Fariñas. The museum presents 201 of Cruz Herrera's works, organised in four rooms under the headings "First epoch", "Andalusian", "Arab" and "Anthology".

== See also ==
- List of Orientalist artists
- Orientalism
