= Benalmádena Museum =

Coordinates: 36.5956°N 4.5732°W

- Museo de Benalmádena
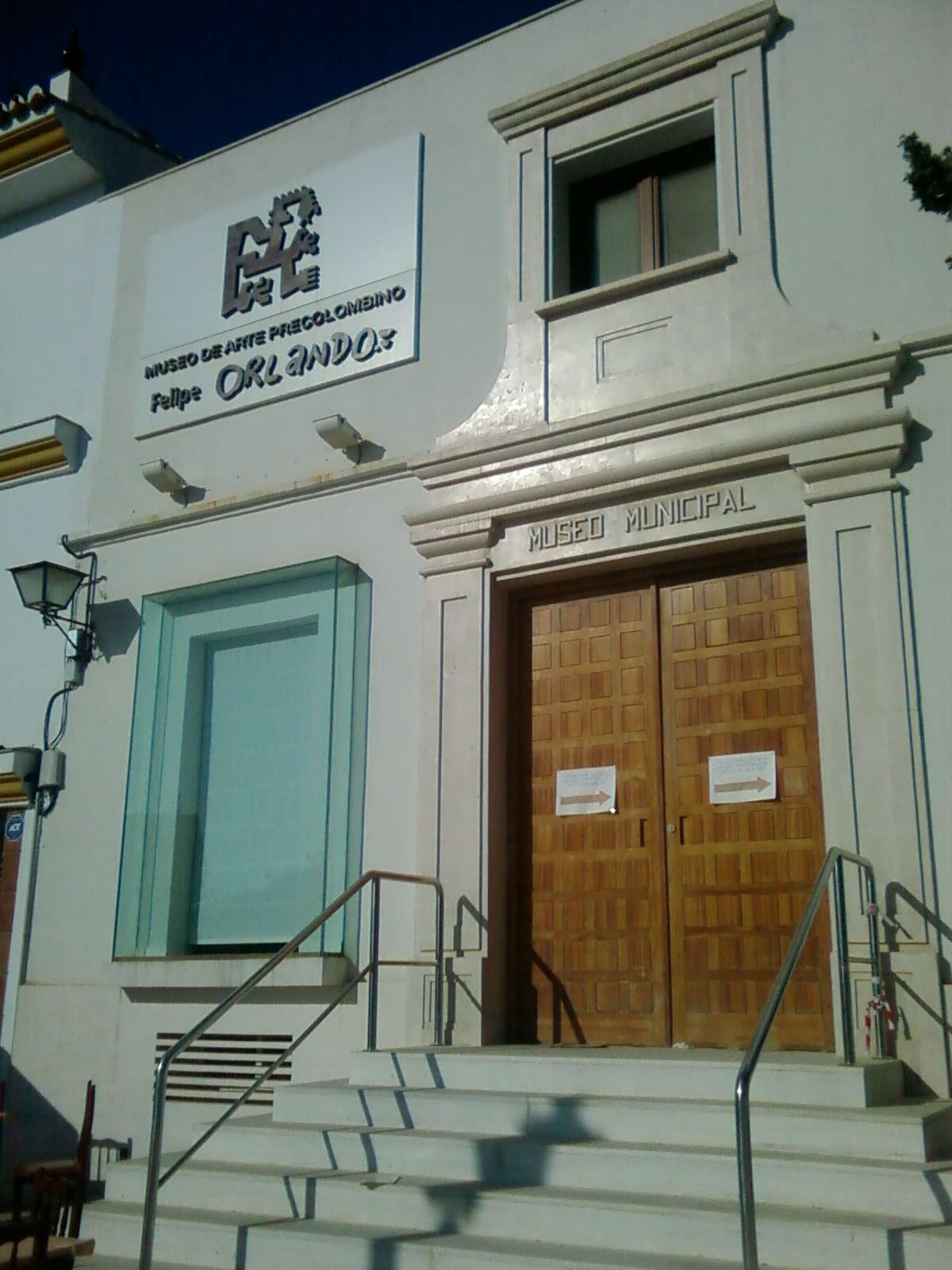
- Established: 1970
- Location: Benalmádena, Spain
- Website: benalmadena.com

The Benalmádena Museum is a museum in Benalmádena, Spain. It is located on Luis Peralta Avenue in the old town area. The museum was opened to the public on 5 May 1970 and renovated on 26 April 2005.

== Collections ==
The main museum collections are:

=== Pre-Columbian collection ===
This collection hosts the Felipe Orlando García-Murciano collection of Pre-Columbian art. It was gathered thanks to donations, lending and acquisitions made by Benalmádena's town hall. The pieces have their origin in several Hispanic American countries: Mexico, Nicaragua, Ecuador, Costa Rica and Peru, to name a few. The exposition illustrates two main nucleus of civilization: The one from Mesoamerica or Old Mexico and the other from the central Andes or Old Peru. Also there is an intermediary area that encompasses the low Central America and the north Andes region. Each of these zones is located in one of the three museum halls. This Pre-Columbian art collection is one of the biggest outside Hispanic America.

The museum is known for its annual parade of Catrinas and its nativity displays. The museum hosts storytelling and lectures about its collections.

=== Archaeological collection ===
This collection contains all the objects obtained during excavations in the district. The archaeological remains in here span from prehistorical times to Ancient Rome.

== See also ==
- List of museums in Spain
