= Museo Arqueológico de La Gomera =

- Museo Arqueológico de La Gomera
- Established: April 25, 2007
- Location: Casa Echeverría, San Sebastián de La Gomera, Spain
- Coordinates: 28°5′33.2″N 17°6′38.7″W
- Type: Archaeological museum
- Collection size: 21,000 pieces
- Owner: Canary Islands Government
- Website: www.museoslagomera.es/museo-arqueologico/

The Museo Arqueológico de La Gomera (Archaeological Museum of La Gomera) is a museum located in San Sebastián de La Gomera, Spain. It is based in the Casa Echeverría, a manor house built in the 18th century, and is focused on the culture of the Gomeros, the ancient people of the island. It was founded on 25 April 2007 in an attempt to gather the existing pieces and to act as a center of archaeological research on the island.

The museum is publicly owned and managed by the Cabildo Insular de La Gomera, in particular by its Servicio de Patrimonio Histórico (Historical Heritage Service).

== Site ==
The museum is located in Casa Echevarría, in San Sebastián de La Gomera. According to Hernández Marrero, the location of the current building could have been the site of an older construction, destroyed by a pirate attack on the island in 1619. The current building dates from the 18th century and was originally the manor house of Miguel de Echeverría y Mayora, a nobleman from Navarre who gave it its current name. During the 20th century, the building, which was popularly known as "La Casa del Cañón" (The House of the Cannon) because of a cannon that acted as a buttress on a corner, housed dwellings on its first floor, the island's courthouse on the second floor and a brassworks on its front. The Casa Echeverría was later bought in 1994 by the island's council and rehabilitated to house the museum, which opened to the public in 2007.

== Collections ==
The museum gathers pieces related to the Gomero aboriginal culture. The most prominent period in the collection is the Gomero prehistory, although, while it technically ends in 1489 with the capture of the island by Castilian conquerors, the aboriginal culture of the island lasted much longer. The exhibition space has four rooms (corresponding to the geographical and historical context, manufactures, anthropology and social issues, and beliefs and symbolism, respectively) and a central patio with 68 original pieces and 5 recreations, as well as a large number of information panels, despite the total collection held by the museum amounting to more than 21,000 pieces.
