= International Bagpipe Museum =

Bagpipe museum in Gijón, Spain

Coordinates: 43.5377°N 5.6337°W

- Muséu Internacional de la Gaita
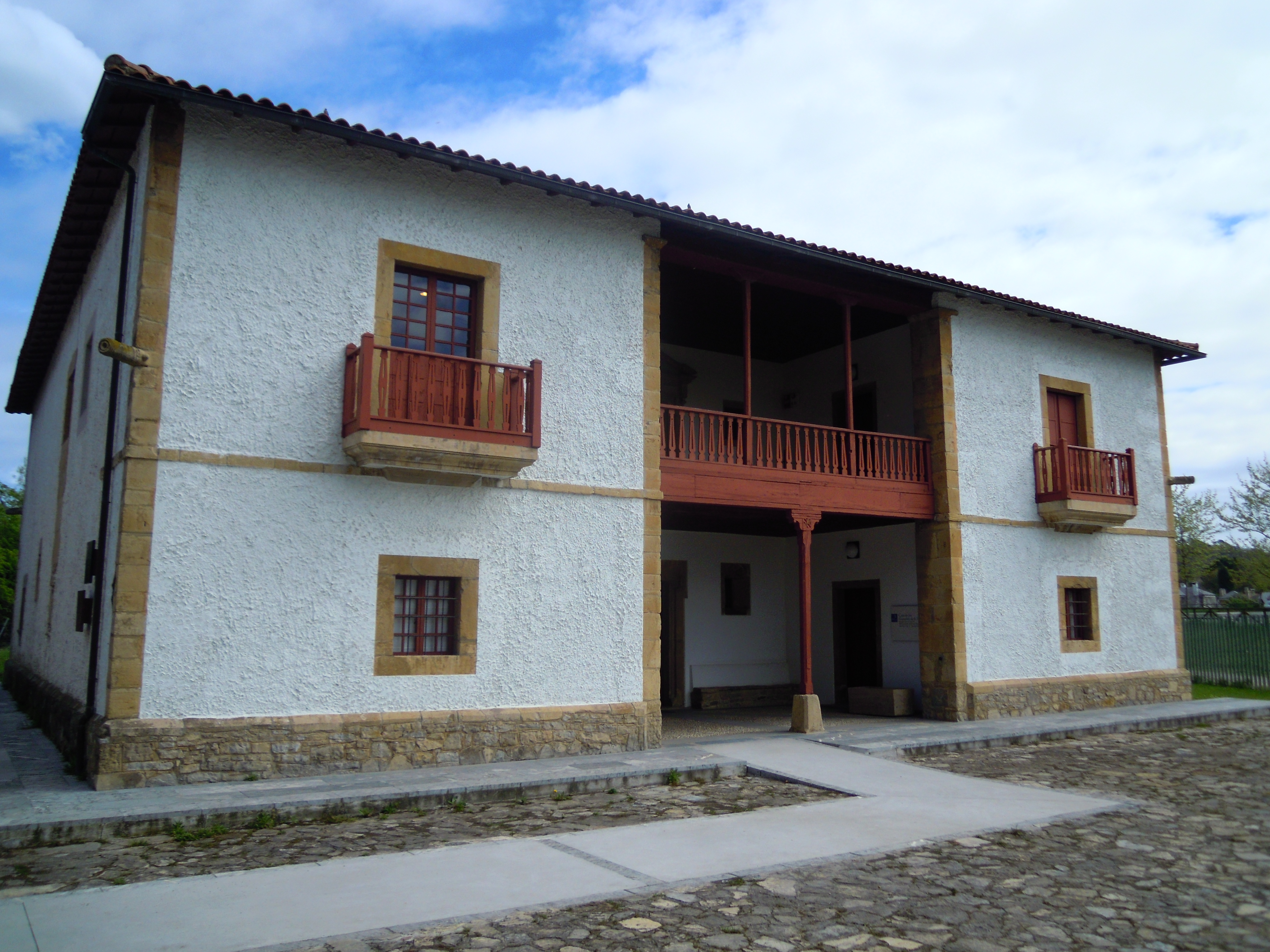
- Established: 1965
- Location: Paseo del Doctor Fleming, 877 (La Güelga), Gijón, Asturias, Spain
- Website: The museum at Gijón City Hall website

The International Bagpipe Museum (Spanish: Museo internacional de la gaita) is located in Gijón, Asturias, Spain. The museum was founded in 1965, and moved to its current location, integrated in the Museum of the Asturian People, in 1975.

The museum houses a large collection of bagpipes from Spain, and from the remainder of Europe, Africa, and Asia. Additionally, the museum features items related to Asturian music.

== See also ==
- List of music museums
