= Lladró Museum =

Coordinates: 39.5039°N 0.3622°W

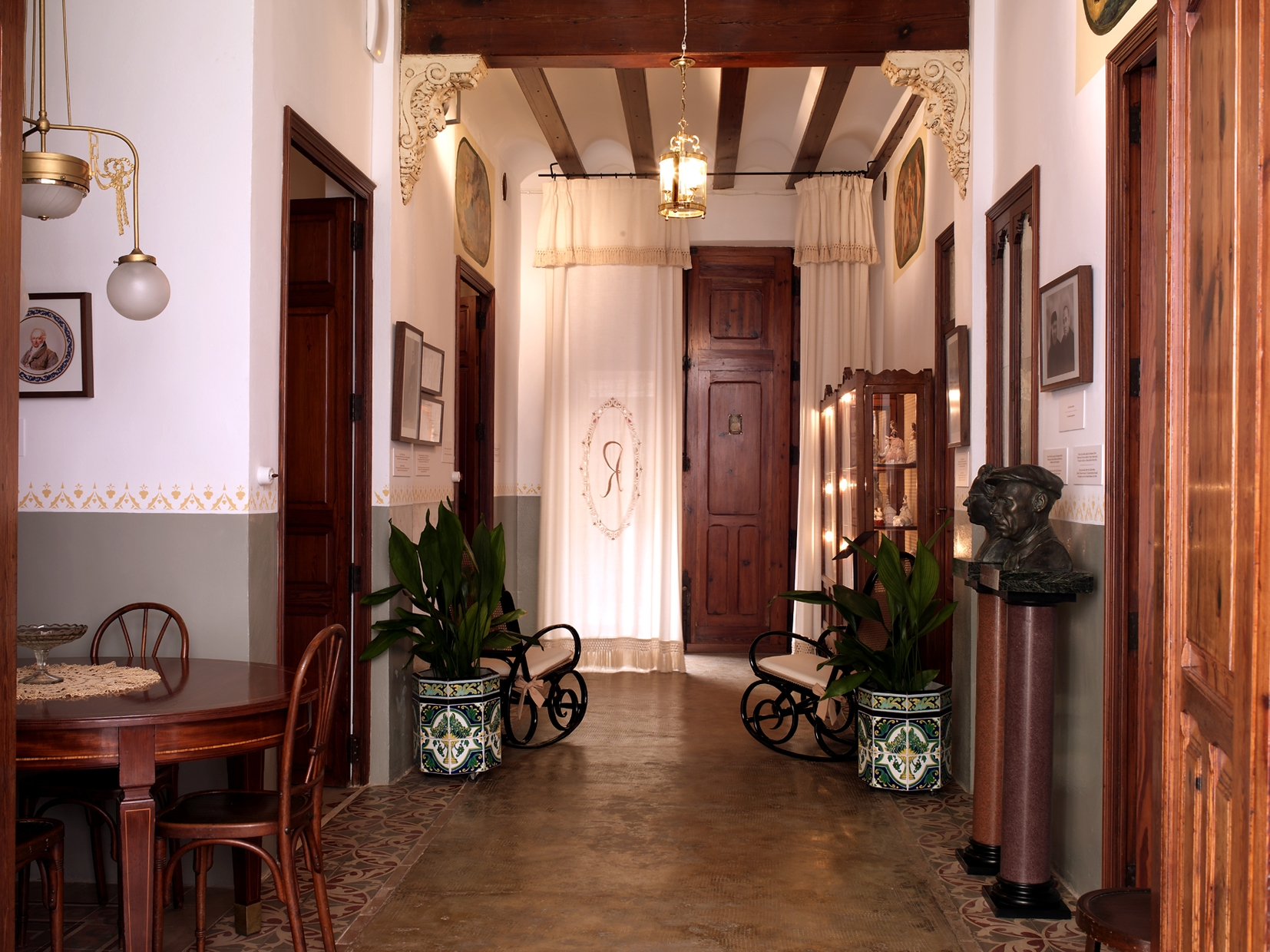
Inside of the Family House in Almàssera

The Lladró Museum is the family home of the Lladró brothers in Almàssera, a town close to Valencia in Spain. It has two permanent exhibits, the Historic Porcelain Museum and the Painting Collection. The family home is a typical Valencian house with exhibits of earlier artistic works, a patio with a Moorish kiln where its first porcelains were fired, and installations where children can learn activities.

== Expositions ==
The Lladró Museum consists of two permanent expositions, the Historic Porcelain Museum and the Painting Collection.

The Lladró Historic Porcelain Museum is formed by pieces retired from commercial catalogue, which have become museum exhibits because of their artistic quality and historic significance. The exposition covers more than 50 years, from the 1950s (beginnings of the firm) to the 1990s.

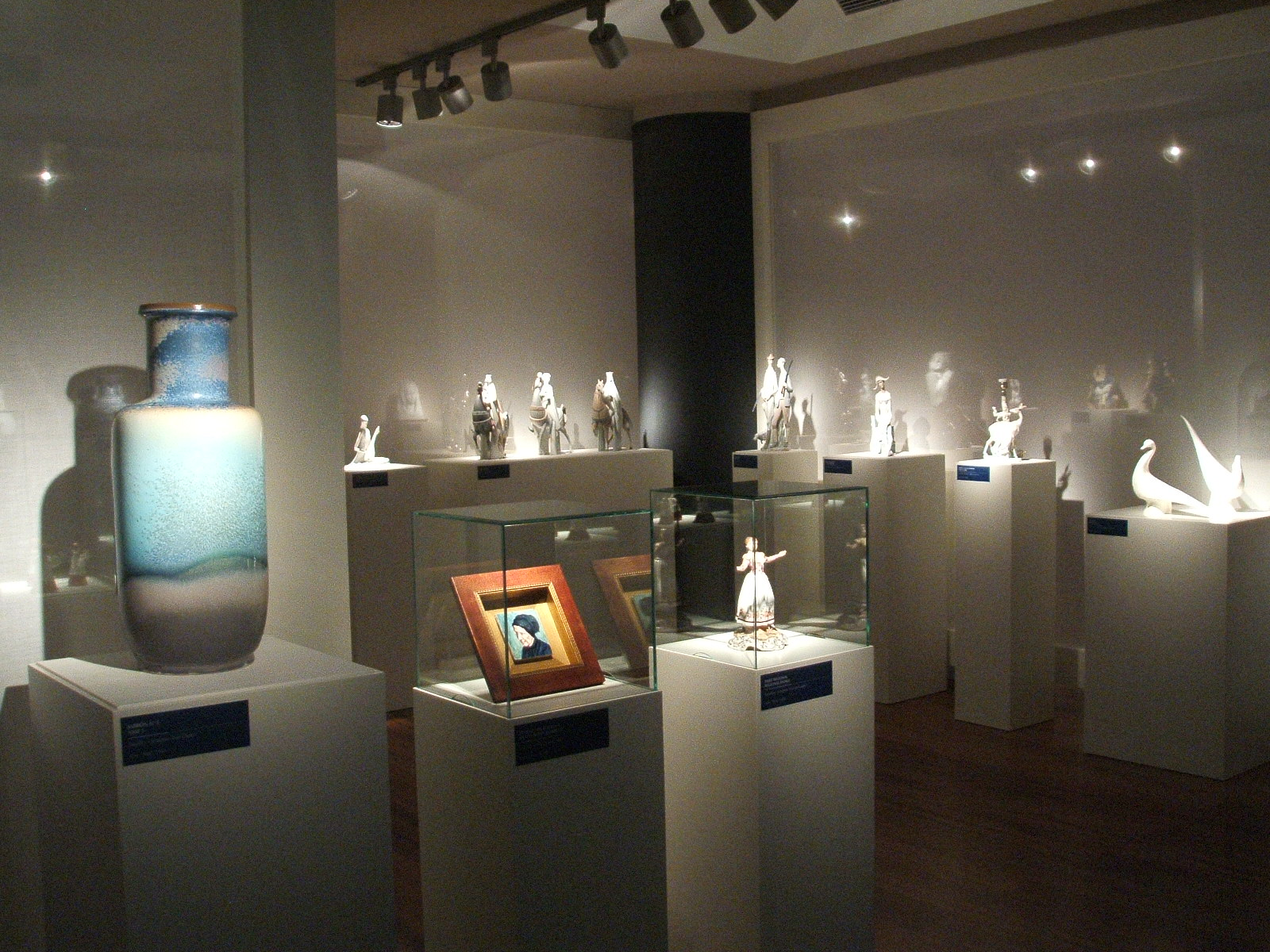
A look of the Lladró historical porcelain collection

The sculptures sum up the history of the brand, focusing on pieces that are characteristic of different styles and materials employed.

The Lladró Pictorial Collection exhibits about 70 pieces ranging from the late 14th century to the middle of the 20th century. Several rooms show Gothic altarpieces, Renaissance panels, Baroque oils and Impressionist canvases, but the most important works pertain to Spanish Baroque period and the most outstanding Valencian painters.

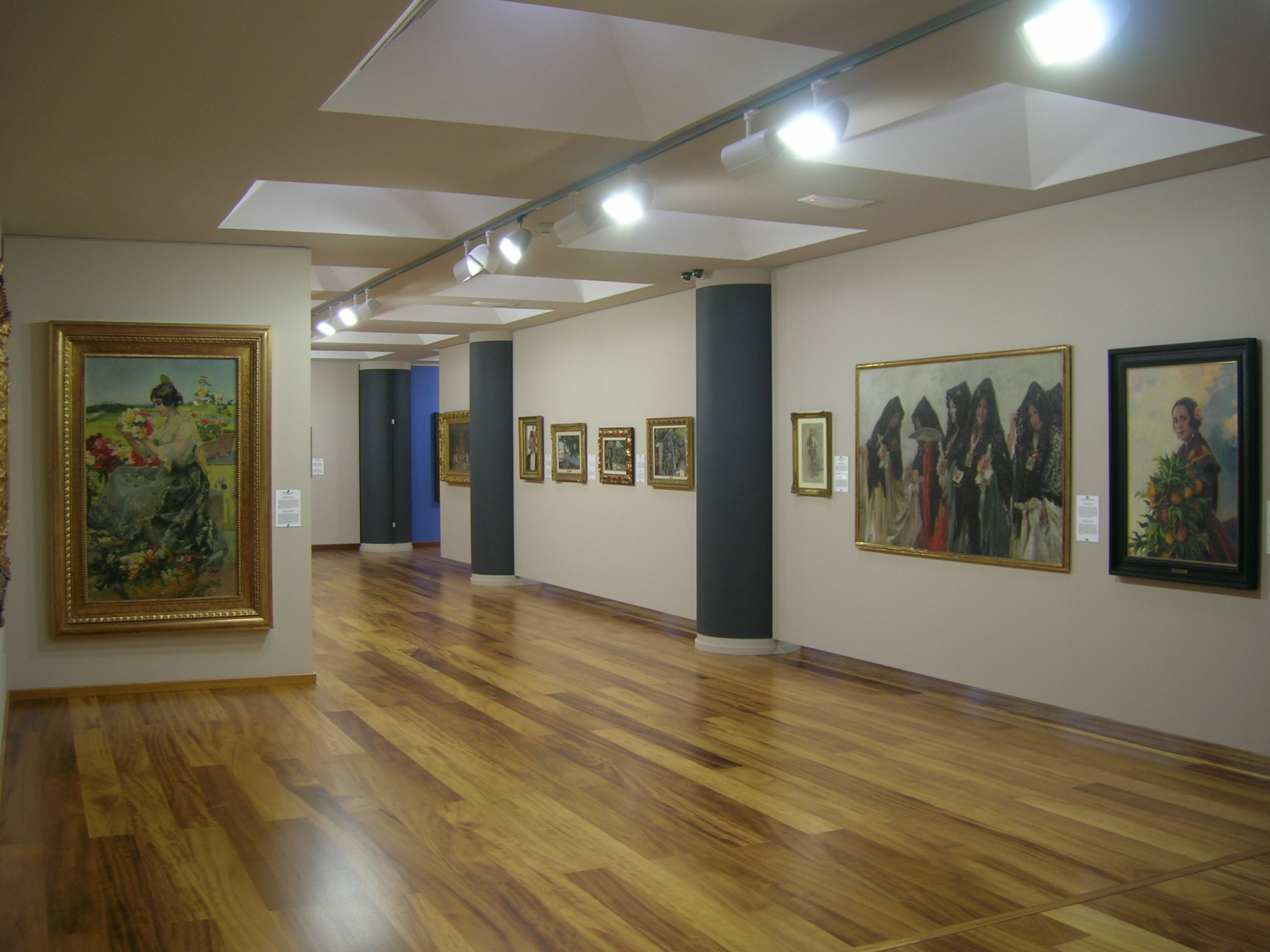
Lladró pictorial collection

The museum shows paintings by noteworthy masters like Rubens, El Greco, Vicente Macip, Juan de Juanes, Juan Ribalta, Sánchez Cotán, Valdés Leal, Francisco de Zurbarán, Vicente López, Ignacio Pinazo, Jusepe de Ribera lo Spagnoletto and Joaquín Sorolla.
