= Museum of the Asturian People =

Coordinates: 43.538°N 5.635°W

- Muséu del Pueblu d'Asturies
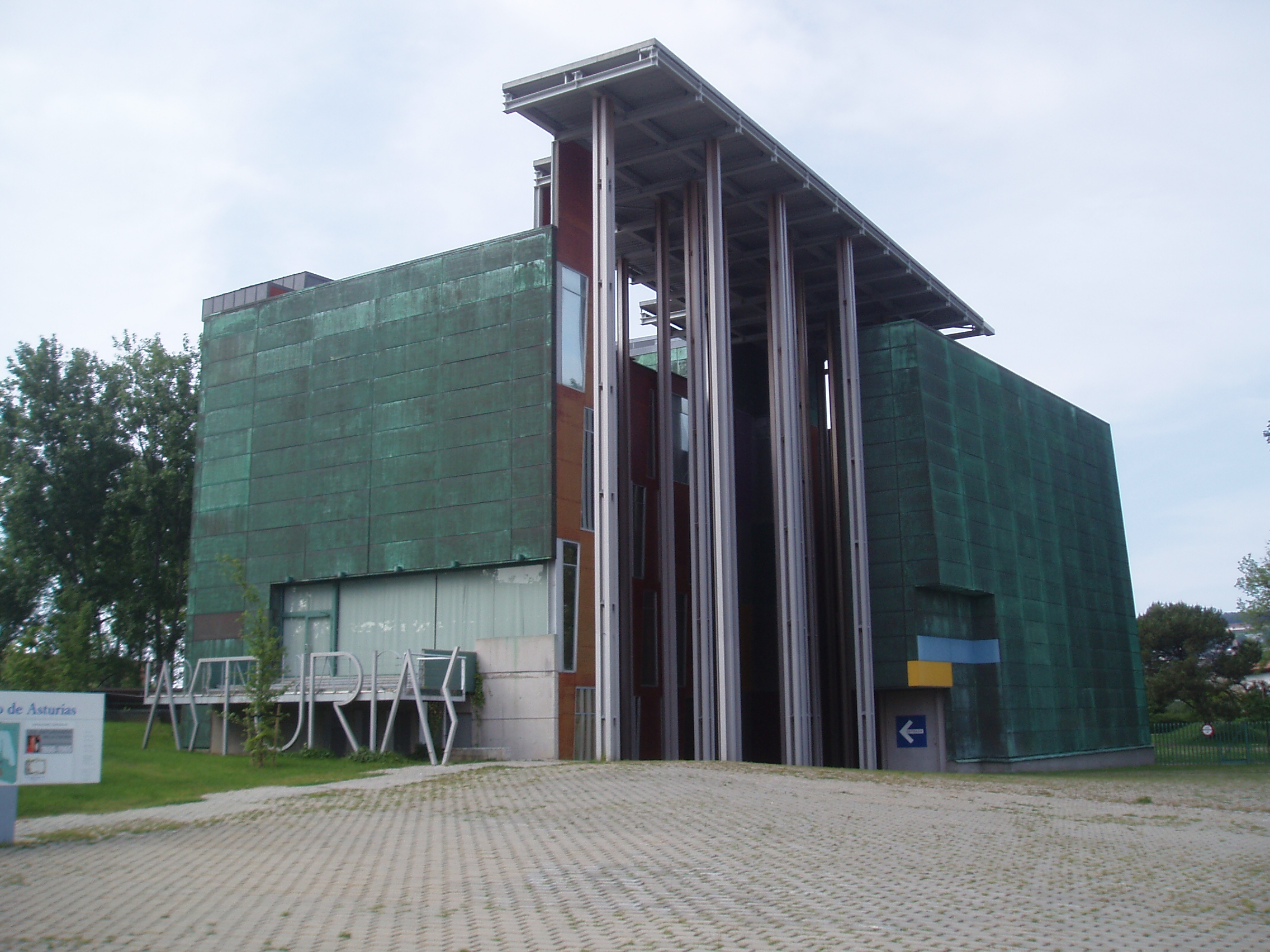
- Established: 1968
- Location: Paseo del Doctor Fleming, 877 (La Güelga), Gijón, Asturias, Spain

The Museum of the Asturian People (Spanish: Museo del Pueblo de Asturias; Asturian: Muséu del Pueblu d'Asturies) is a museum in Gijón, Principality of Asturias, Spain. It is an open-air artspace containing Asturian popular art installations, large ethnographic items, and three buildings:

- Casa de los Valdes: temporary exhibition space
- Casa de los González de la Vega: site of the International Bagpipe Museum, including a collection of traditional Asturian musical instruments.
- The Asturian Pavilion from the 1992 Universal Exposition of Seville, installed at the museum in 1994.

The museum is also known as Asturian Village (Spanish: Pueblo de Asturias; Asturian: Pueblu d'Asturies), since pueblo (in Asturian language, pueblu) means both village and people, and the museum documents the culture of Asturian people, while being in a setting that contains rural buildings and houses, resembling a traditional Asturian village.
