= Museum of Words =

Non-profit organization and museum in Quero, Toledo, Spain

Coordinates: 39.5095°N 3.2489°W

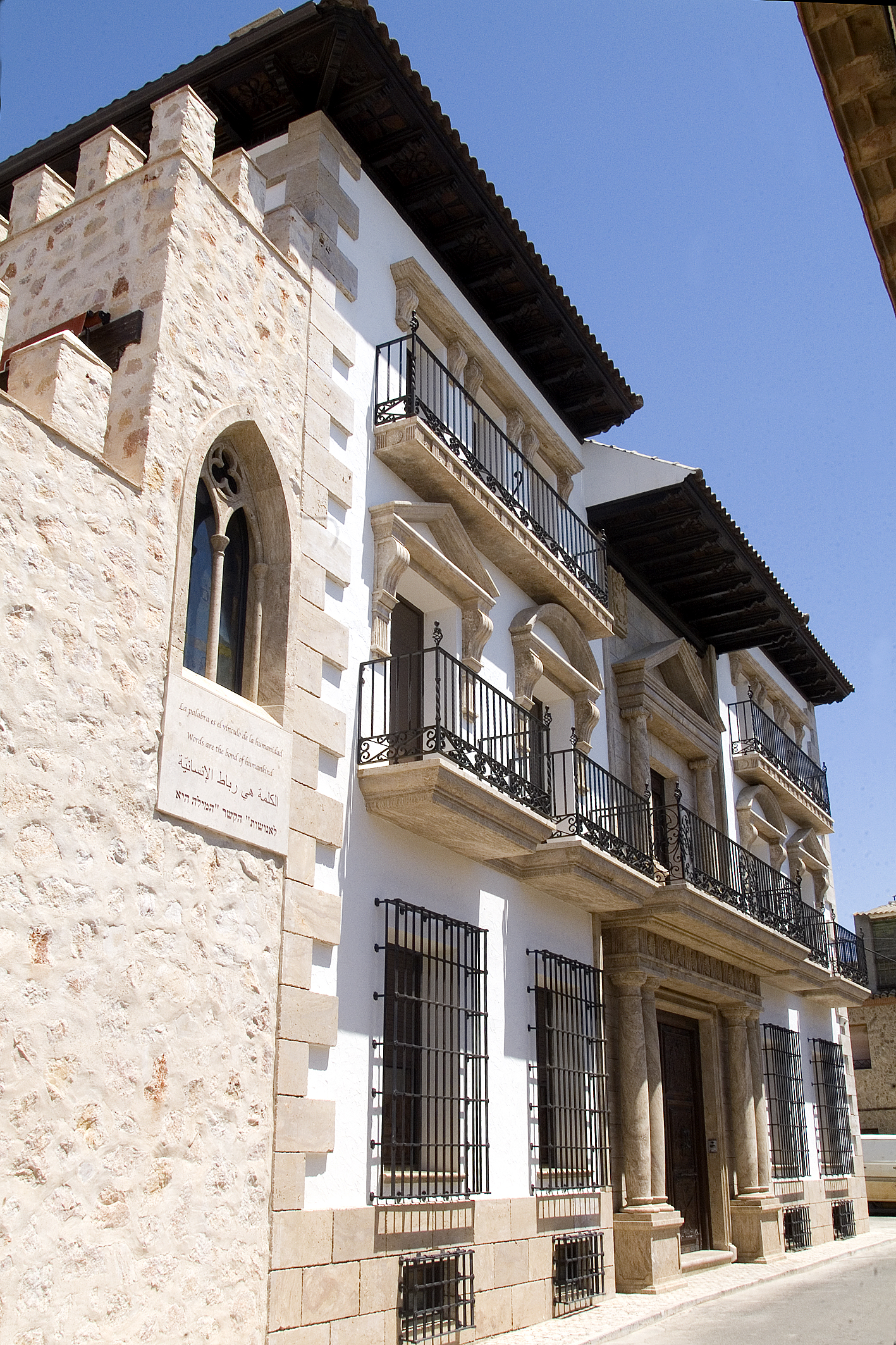
The Museum of Words in Quero, Spain.

The Museum of Words (Museo de la Palabra in Spanish) is a non-profit organization, part of the Cesar Egido Serrano Foundation, whose ethos is to promote art and the use of dialogue as a tool to achieve peace between different cultures and religions. The museum is situated in Quero, province of Toledo, Spain.

The Foundation's Board of Trustees is composed by: Narciso Ntugu Abeso, ex Ambassador of Guinea, the Ambassadors of Cyprus, Egypt and Croatia, the journalist Raul del Pozo and the politician Enrique Mugica Herzog. María Dolores de Cospedal is the Honorary Chairman of the institution.

== History ==
The museum was inaugurated on 23 November 2009 by the President of Castilla la Mancha region, José María Barreda Fontes. On that day the museum awarded the I Edition of the Flash Fiction Competition, Museum of Words. This date has become the International Day of Words.

== International Flash Fiction Competition ==
The Museum of Words organizes every two years the Flash Fiction Competition “Museum of Words", with a first prize of $20,000 for the winner story and three runners up prizes of $2,000 in the other languages categories different from the winner. Writers can enter the competition in Spanish, English, Arabic or Hebrew language, and the stories can only have a maximum of 100 words, making the prize the best equipped per word. There have been already four editions of the contest.

In the third edition, 119 countries entered with 22.571 stories, and the Jury was formed by 21 Ambassadors.

In the IV Edition of the contest 35.609 stories have been entered the competition, from 149 countries.

== Ambassadors of the Word ==
Celebrating the International Day of the Word as Bond of Humankind, and from November 23, 2014, the Museum of the Words honours to writers -whose works promote peace and concord between humans- with the title of Ambassador of the Word.
