= Albacete Police Museum =

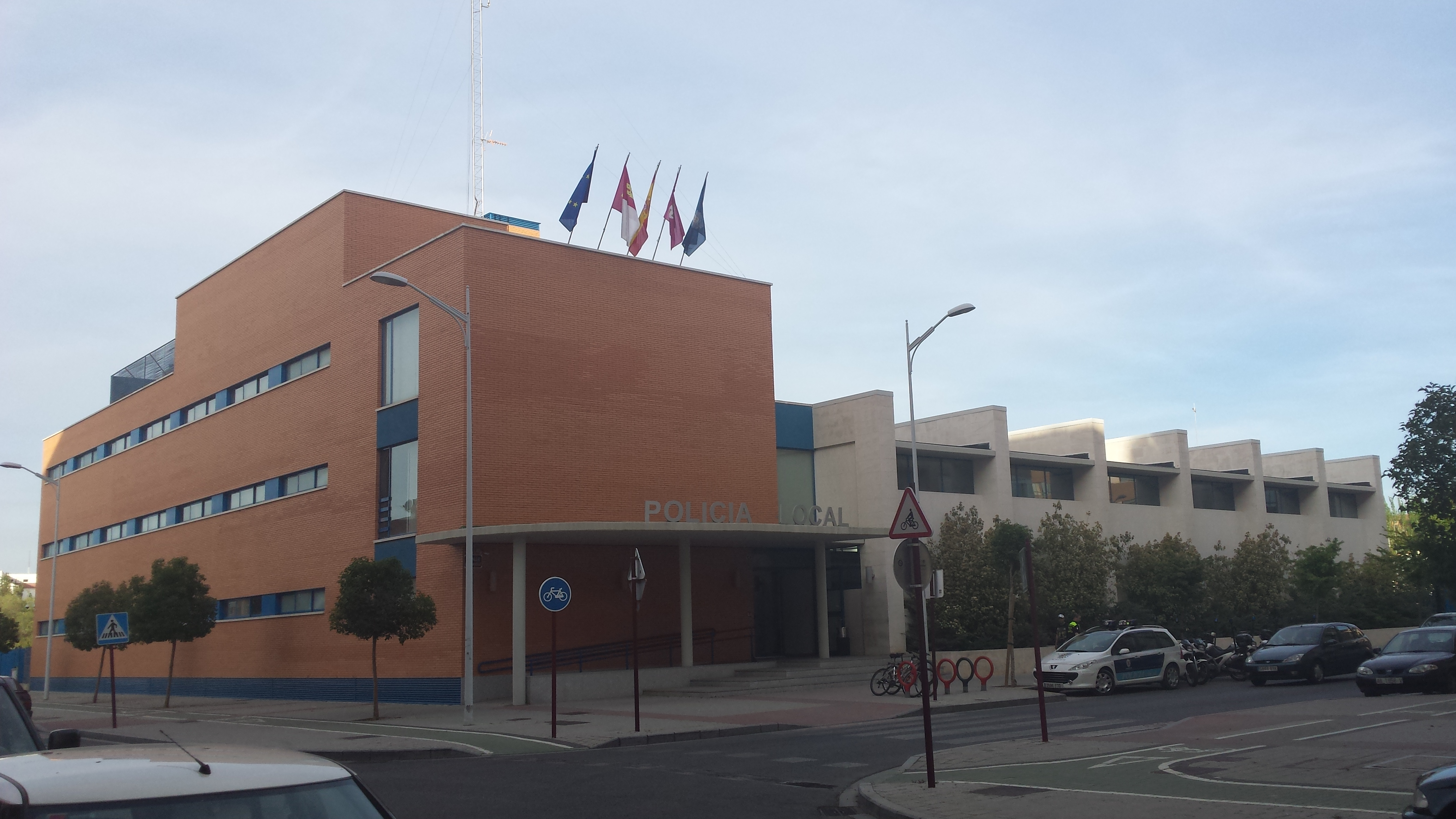
Headquarters of the Police Museum of Albacete.

The Albacete Police Museum (Spanish: Museo de la Policía de Albacete or Museo Policial de Albacete) is a museum on the history of the city police in Albacete, Spain. It opened on 2 October 2006 in new rooms in the Jefatura de la Policía Local de Albacete.

== Collections ==
The earliest uniform in the collection dates to 1854, the date of the foundation of the city's Municipal Guard.

The Police Museum shows the history of the Albacete Local Police through its symbols, clothing, weapons and vehicles. The collection of uniforms dates from 1854, when the Municipal Guard was founded, to the present day. Among the vehicles, the collection of all the motorcycles used by the police throughout its history as well as the bicycles used in the 40s and 50s of the 20th century stand out. The museum showcases display antique weapons and other police items.

The Police Museum shows the history of the Albacete Local Police through its symbols, clothing, weapons and vehicles.

Among the vehicles, the collection of all the motorcycles that the police have used throughout its history stands out, as well as the bicycles that were used in the 40s and 50s of the 20th century. In the museum's display cases you can see old weapons and other police elements.
