= Museo Cruz Herrera =

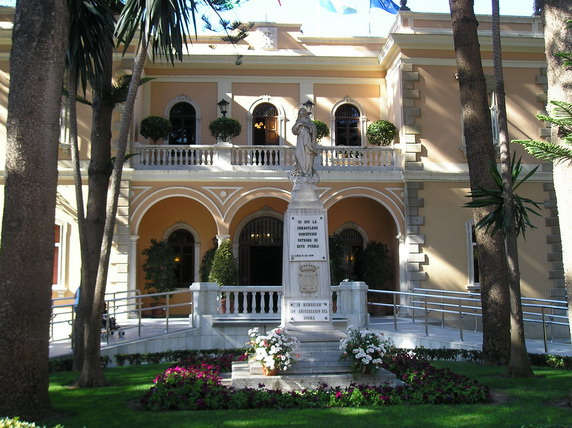
- Museo Cruz Herrera
- Established: 1975
- Coordinates: 36°09′37.2″N 5°21′03.8″W
- Type: Art museum, Design/Textile Museum, Historic site
- Website: www.museocruzherrera.com

Museo José Cruz Herrera is a museum in La Línea de la Concepción, Spain. Established in 1975, it is named after the portrait artist José Cruz Herrera .

== Description ==
The idea for the museum happened in Cruz Herrera's lifetime. After he died in 1972, his children completed the project, adding works that they owned to the inaugural collection.

The museum was in the Casa de la Cultura within the Plaza de Fariñas which opened on 6 April 1975, but since January 2016 has moved to its current location. The museum has over 201 of Cruz Herrera's works sorted into four rooms: "First epoch", "Andalusian", "Arab" and "Anthology".
