= Museo Fundación Rafael Alberti =

Biographical museum in El Puerto de Santa María, Spain

Coordinates: 36.5982°N 6.2282°W

The Museo Fundación Rafael Alberti is a museum in El Puerto de Santa María, Spain, which explores the life of the writer and poet Rafael Alberti.This museum explores the life of this renowned writer and poet

== See also ==
- List of museums in Spain
