= Doña Pakyta Museum of Art =

Art museum in Almeria, Spain

- Museo de Arte Doña Pakyta
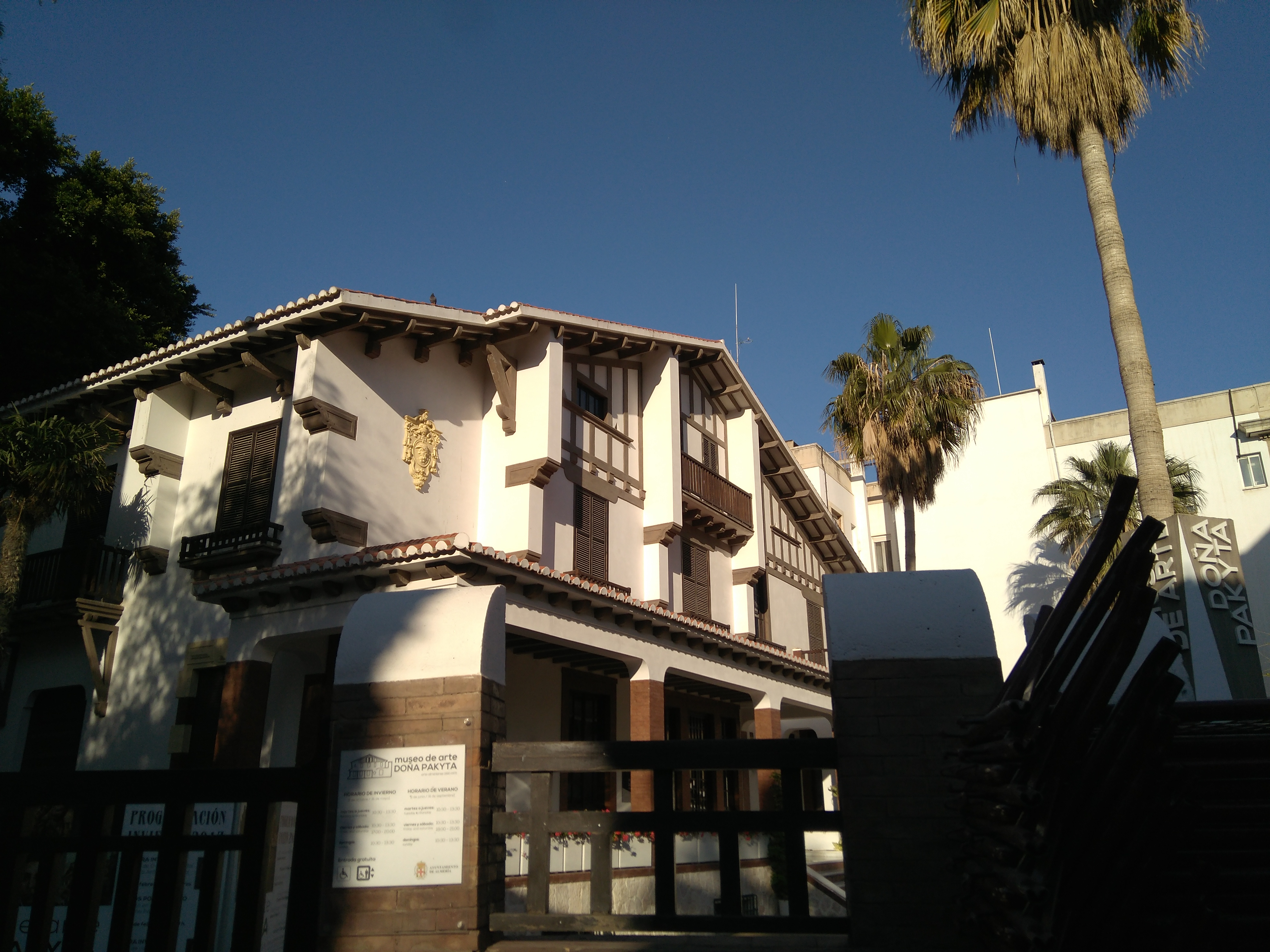
- Established: 1928
- Location: Almería
- Coordinates: 36°50′06.91″N 2°27′47.52″W
- Type: Regionalist architecture
- Architect: Guillermo Langle
- Owner: Francisca Díaz Torres

Doña Pakyta Museum of Art (Spanish: Museo de Arte Doña Pakyta), previously known as Casa Montoya or Casa Vasca, is an art museum located in Almería. It was the home of Francisca Díaz Torres, known as Doña Pakyta, who granted it.

It was built in 1928 by Guillermo Langle, ordered by Antonio González Egea. It was opened in May 2015 as a museum.
