= Centro Andaluz de la Fotografía =

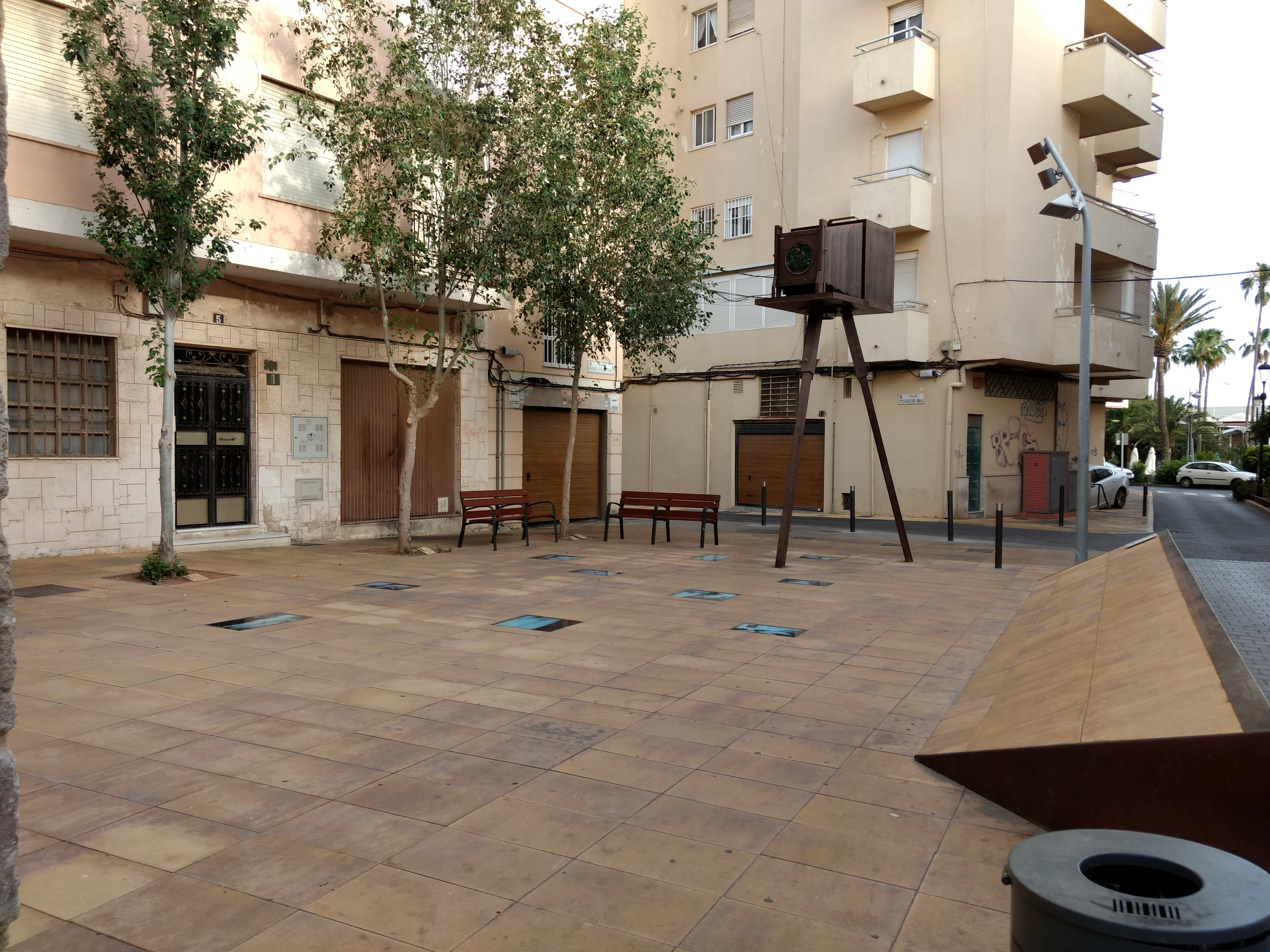

The Centro Andaluz de la Fotografía, created in 1992, is a photographic institution based in Almería, Spain. In 1996 this center was placed under the Directorate General of Historical Heritage Institutions (Dirección General de Instituciones del Patrimonio Histórico).

The foundation is a permanent institution which approaches photography from an interdisciplinary perspective. It currently offers exhibitions, workshops, photographic catalogs issues, research, dissemination, and retrieval of knowledge related to Andalusian photographic heritage.
