= Museo Arqueológico Municipal de El Puerto de Santa María =

Local museum in El Puerto de Santa María, Spain

Coordinates: 36°35′56.85″N 6°13′42.97″W

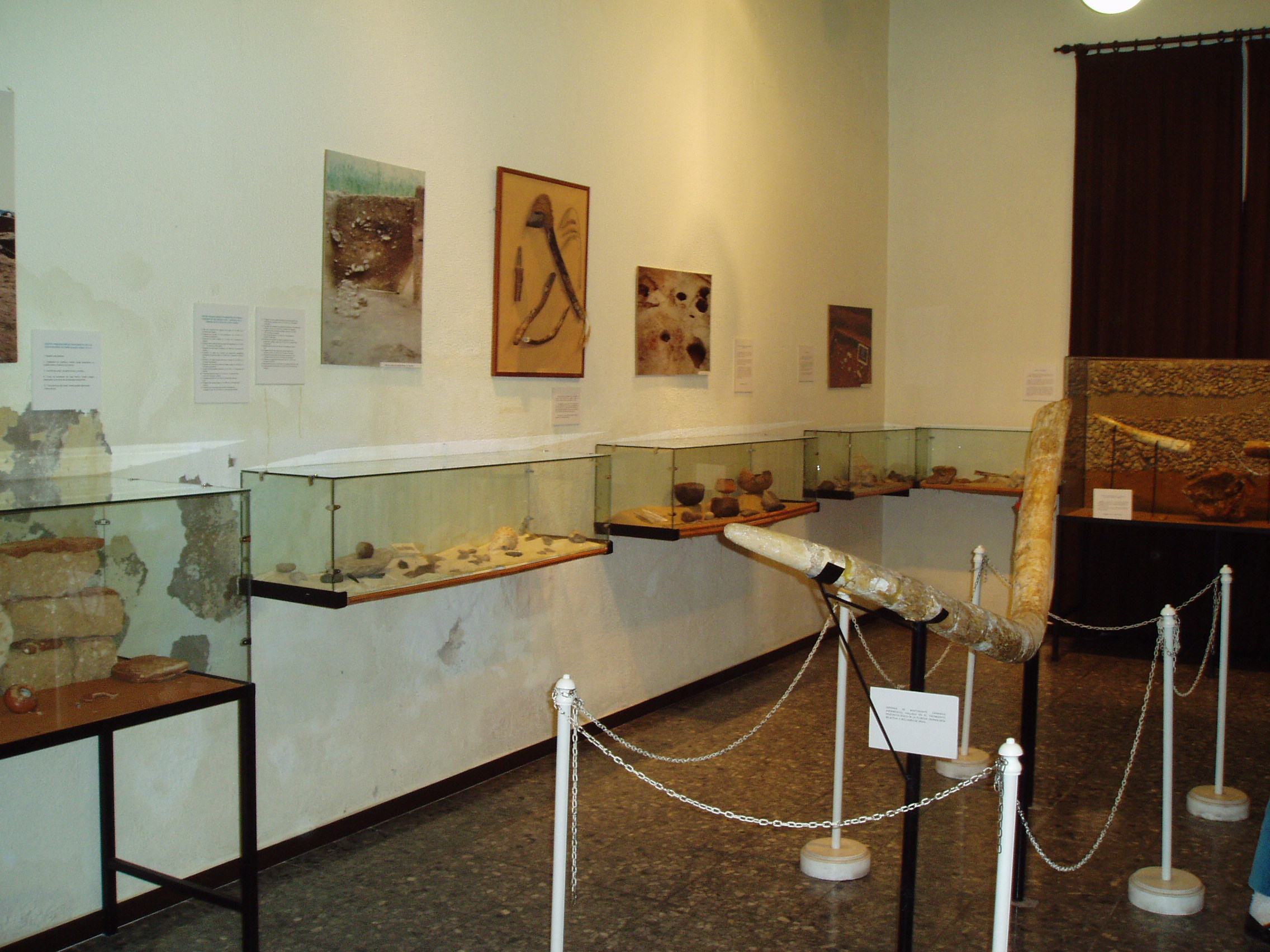
The main room of the museum. A tusk of mastodon is exhibited.

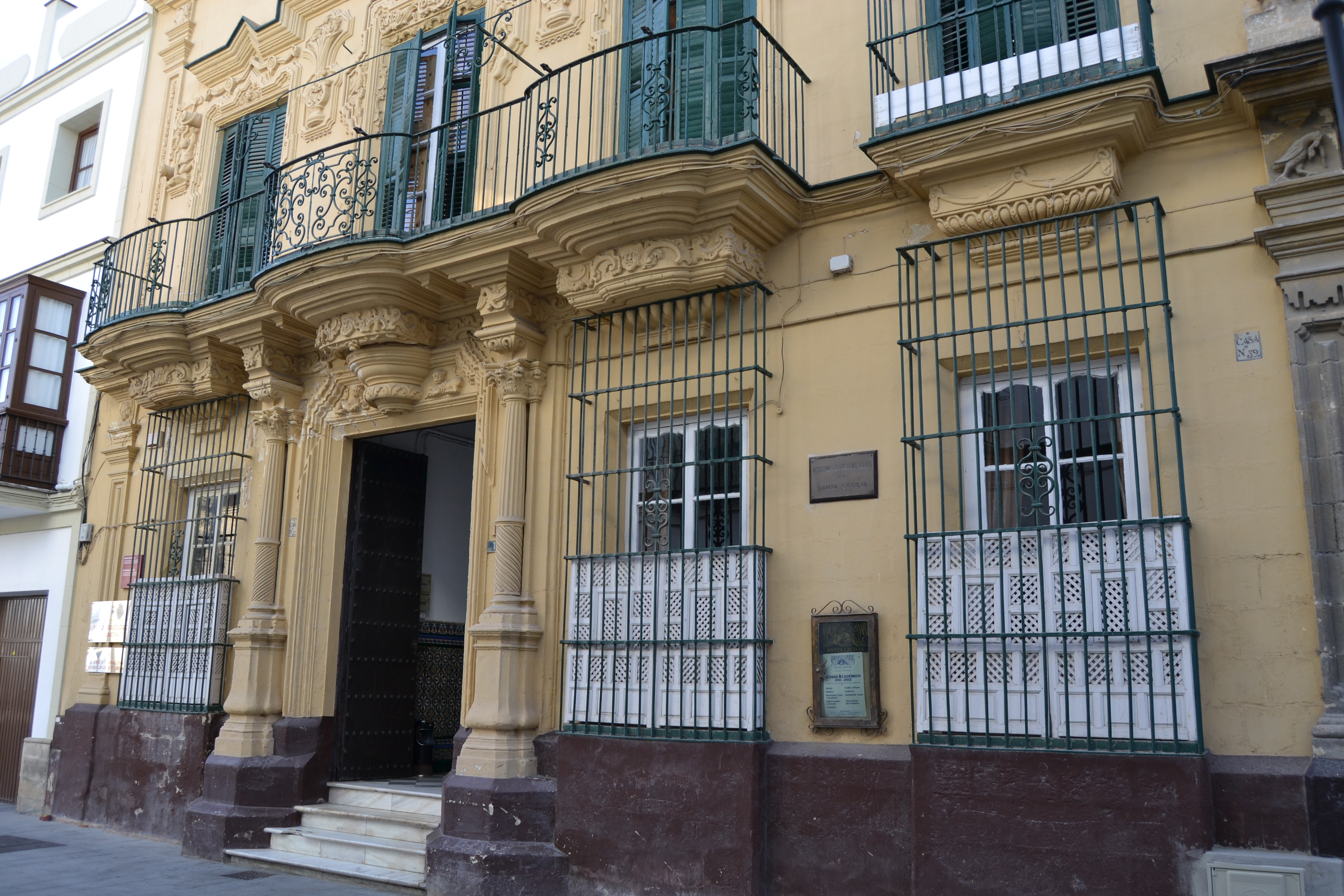
Main entrance

The Museo Arqueológico Municipal de El Puerto de Santa María is a museum located in El Puerto de Santa María, in the province of Cádiz, southern Spain. It was founded in 1980.

It contains paintings and sculptures of Francisco Lameyer, Eulogio Varela Sartorio, Enrique Ochoa, Fernando Jesús, Juan Lara, Manolo Prieto, and some works of Rafael Alberti.

Some pieces are exhibited in another building called Hospitalito.

== See also ==
- List of museums in Spain
