= Museo Arqueológico Municipal de Jerez de la Frontera =

- Museo Arqueológico Municipal de Jerez de la Frontera (Spanish)
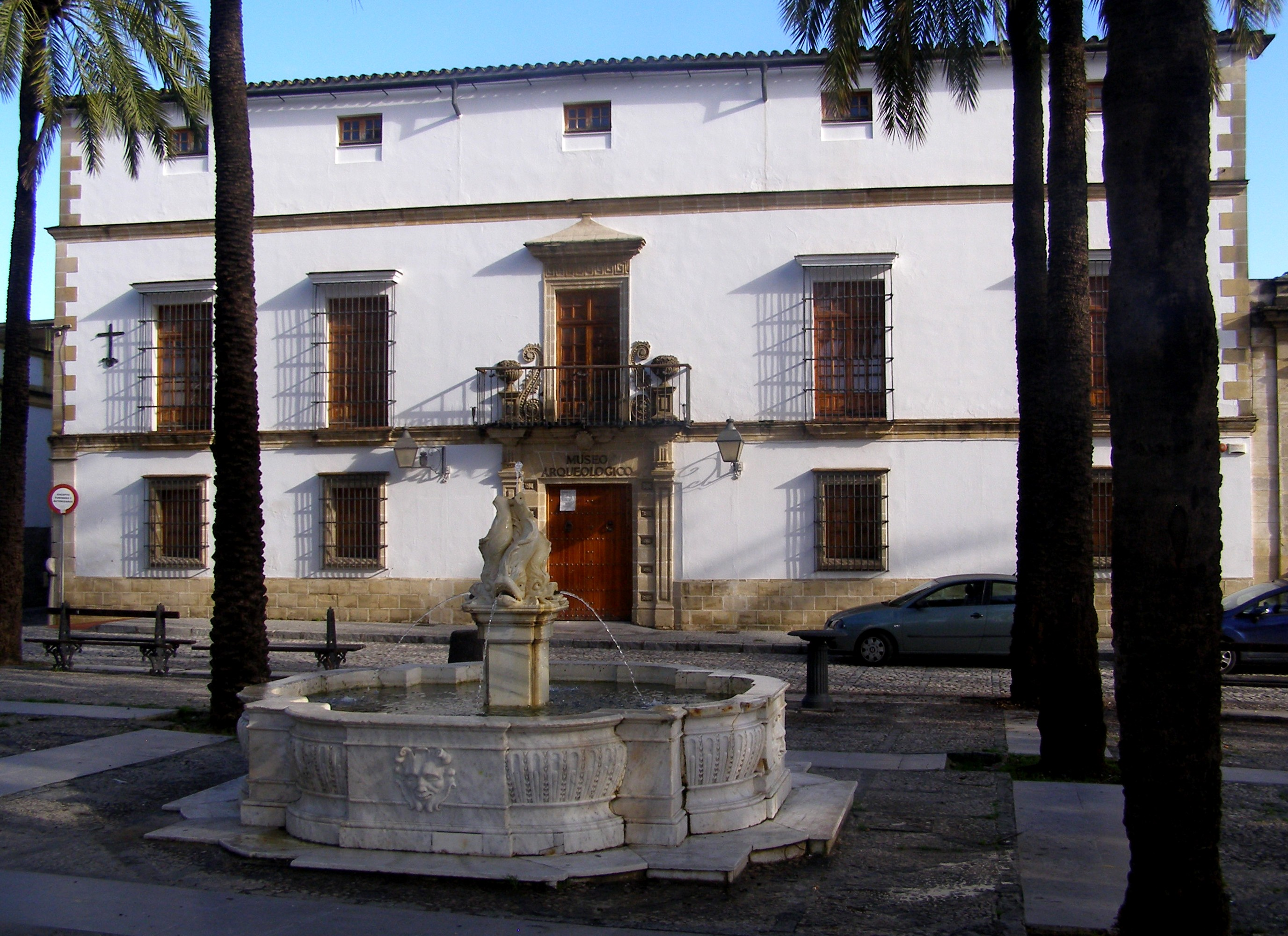

- Location within Province of Cádiz Location within Spain
- 36.684898°N 6.144798°W
- Location: Jerez de la Frontera, Spain

Spanish Cultural Heritage
- Official name: Museo Arqueológico Municipal de Jerez de la Frontera
- Type: Non-movable
- Criteria: Monument
- Designated: 1962
- Reference no.: RI-51-0001340

The Museo Arqueológico Municipal de Jerez de la Frontera is an archaeological museum on the Plaza del Mercado in Jerez de la Frontera, province of Cádiz, southern Spain. The museum occupies an 18th-century building which was declared Bien de Interés Cultural in 1962.

It was established in 1873 as the Municipal Archaeological Collection, merging collections donated by wealthy individuals, and based at the Old City Hall of Jerez de la Frontera. The museum opened to the public in 1935. The collection includes a Corinthian helmet, extremely rare in Spain, found near the city's Charterhouse by the river Guadalete. The collection also includes Roman ceramics and other items.

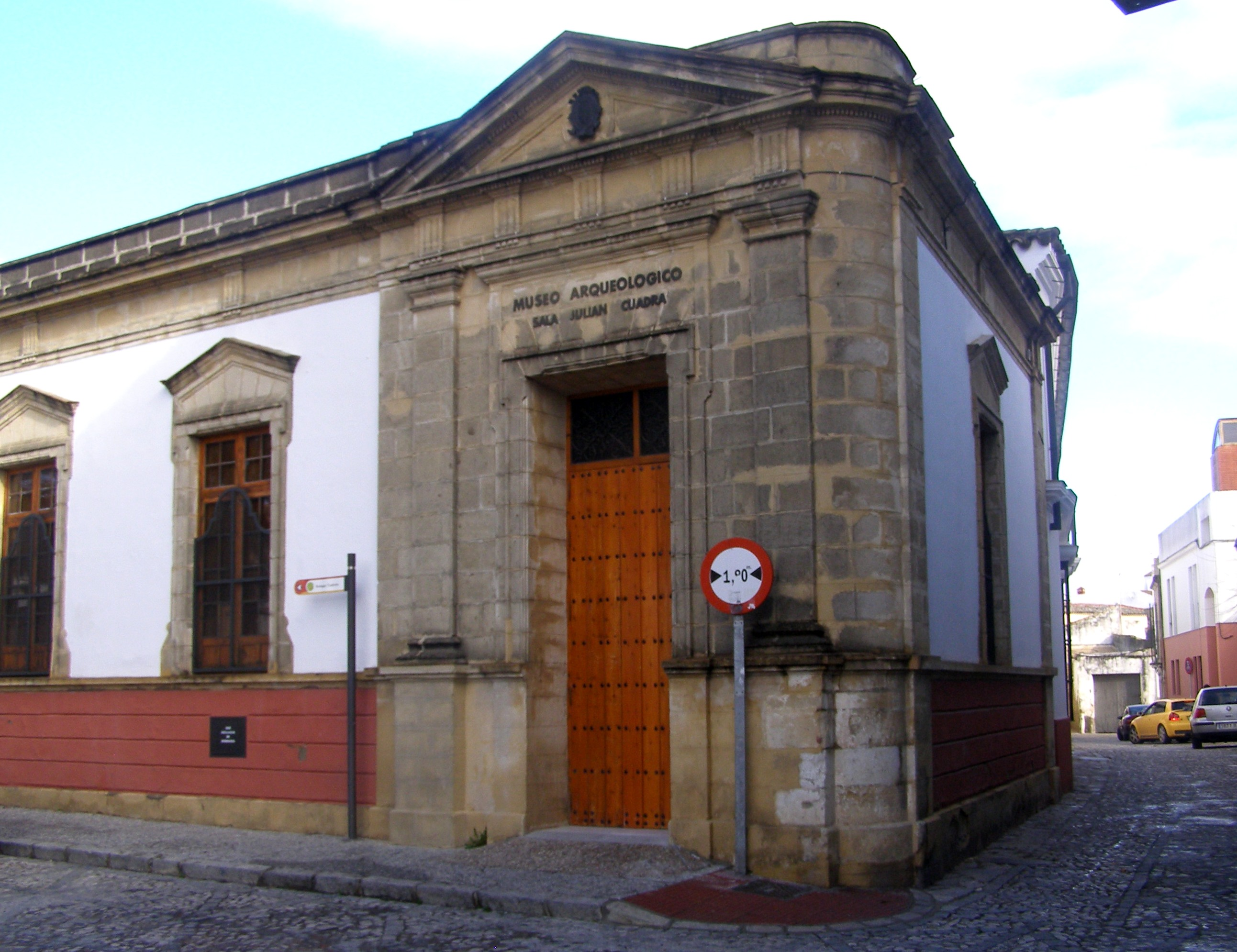

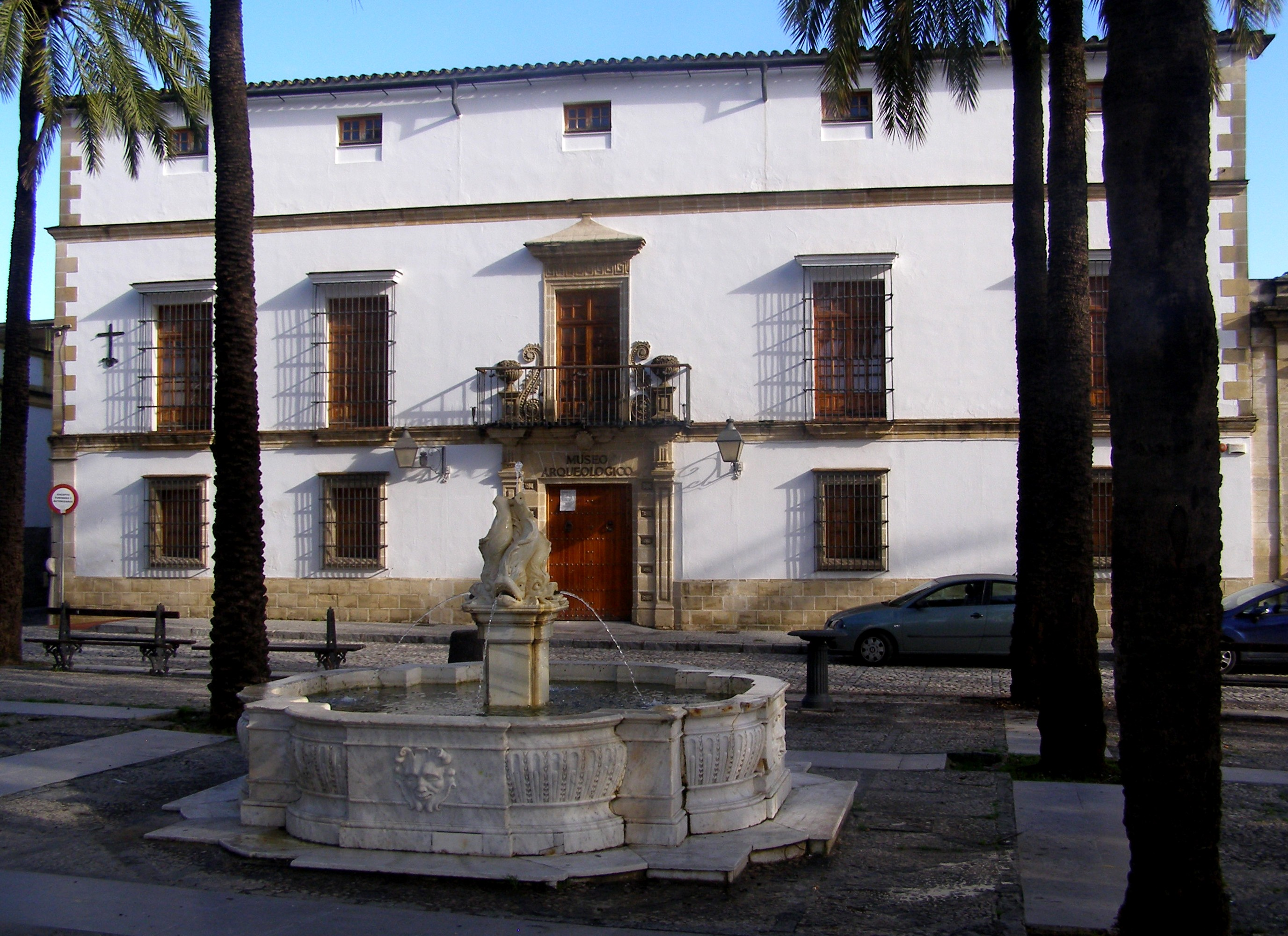

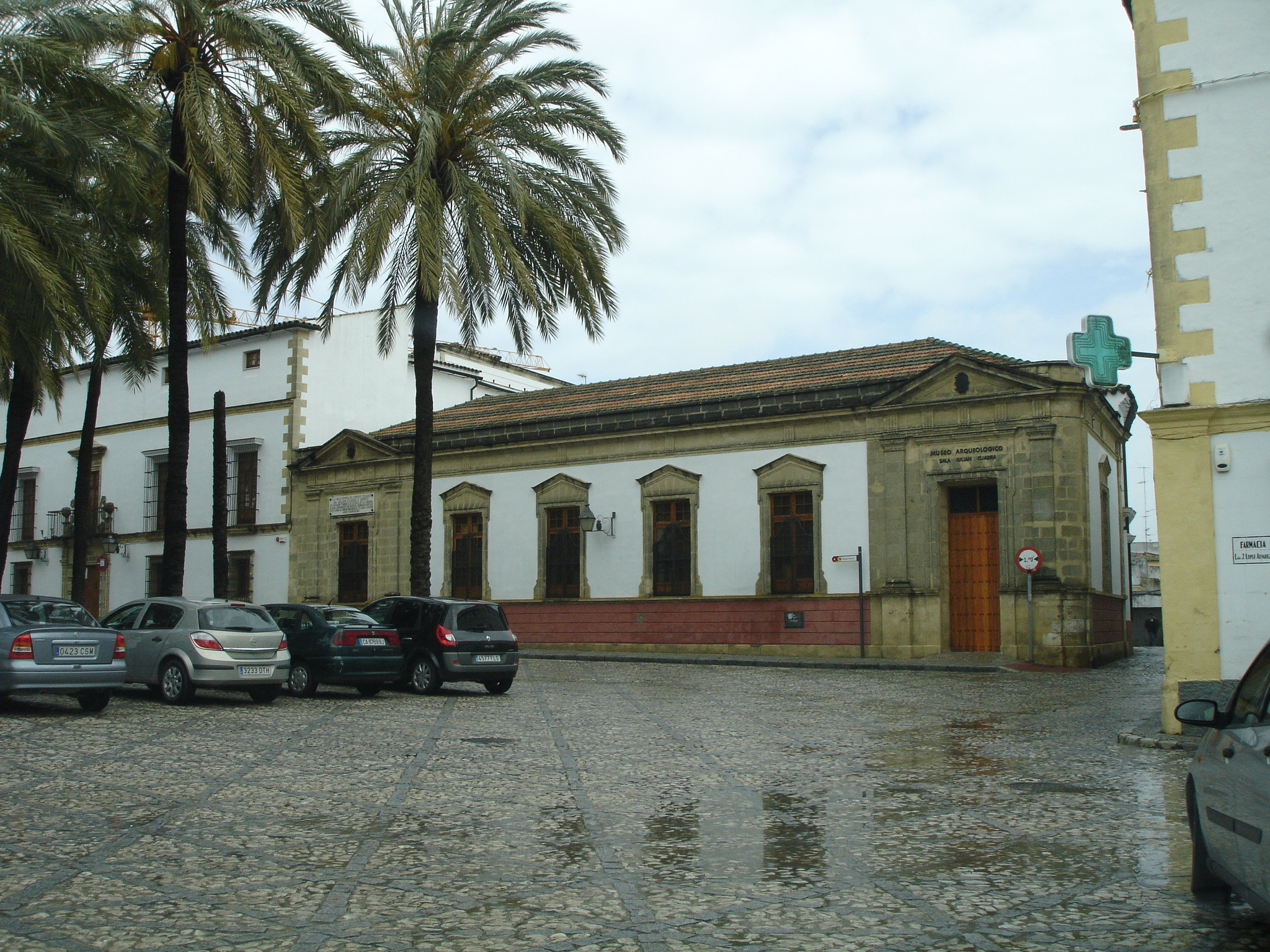

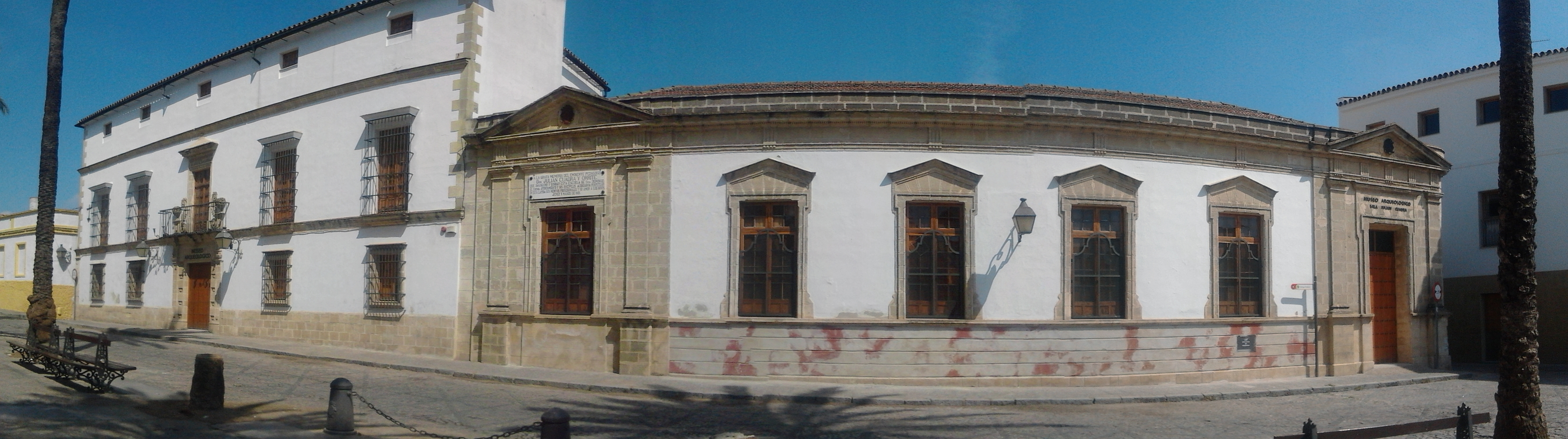

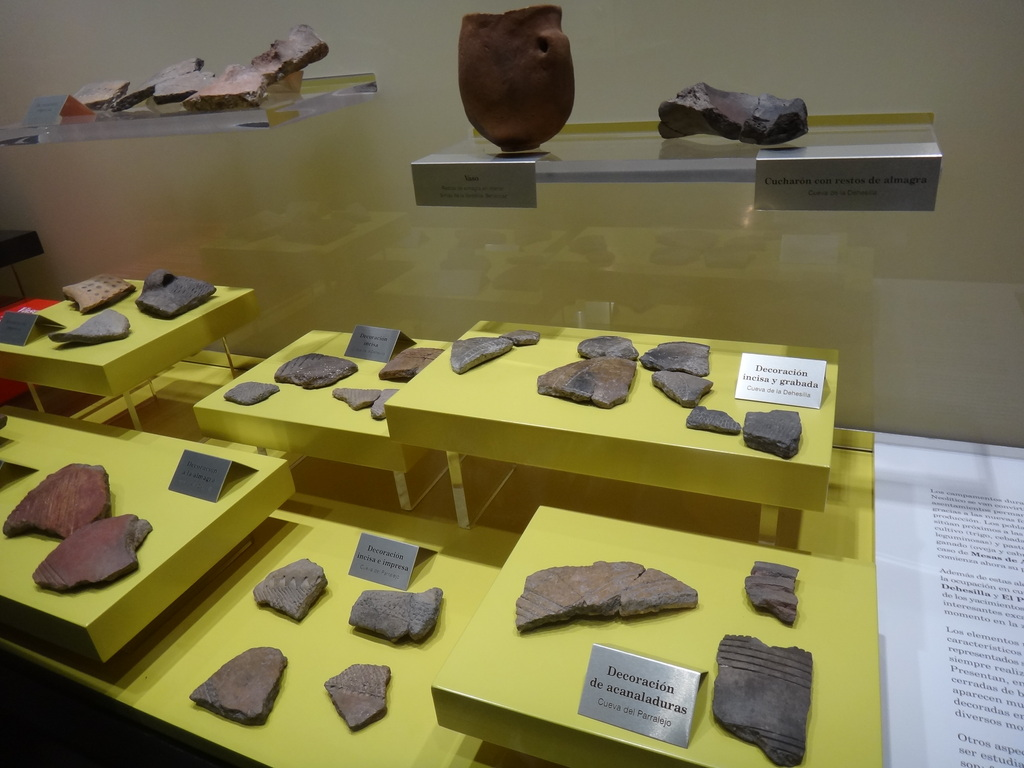

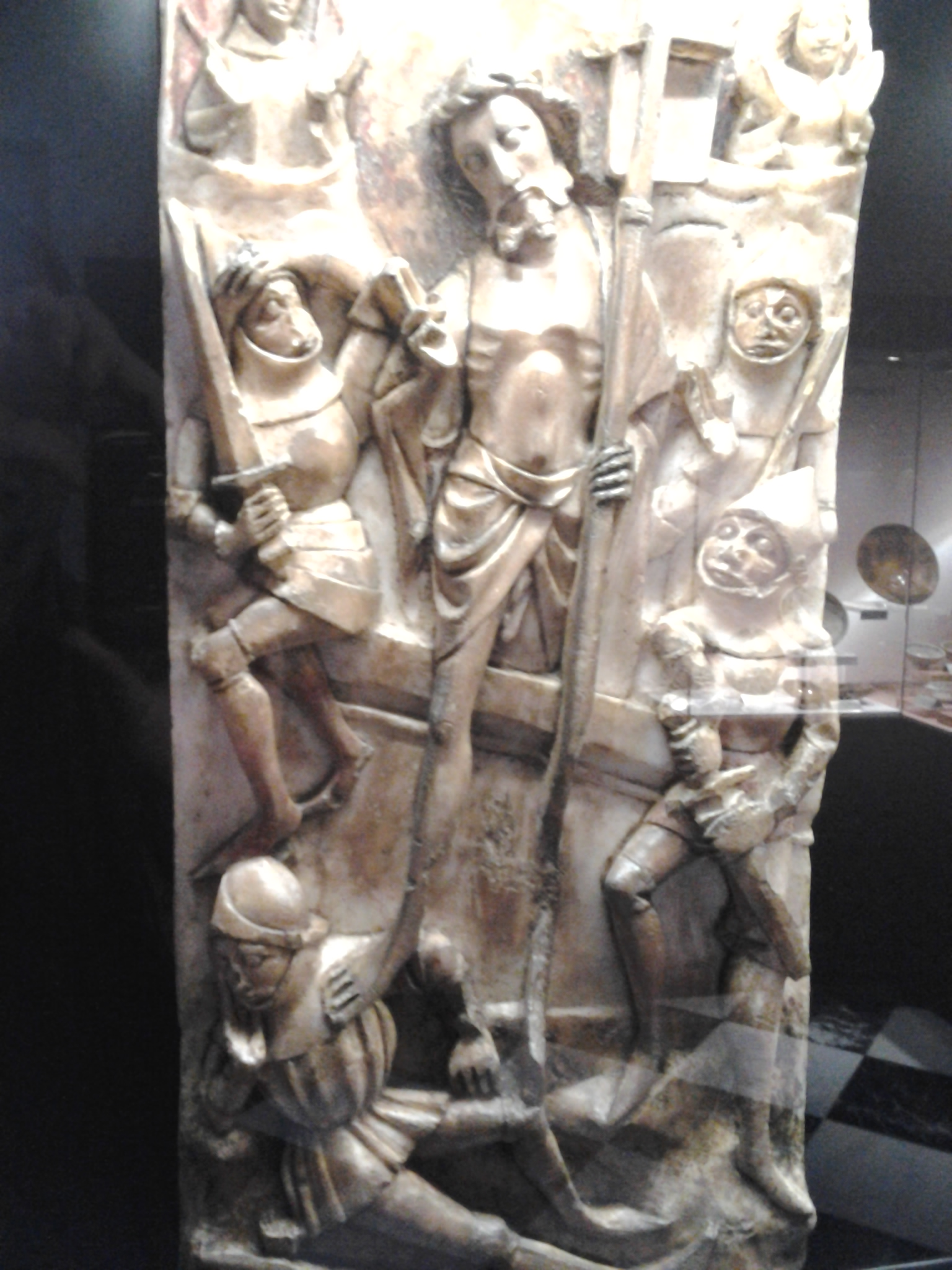

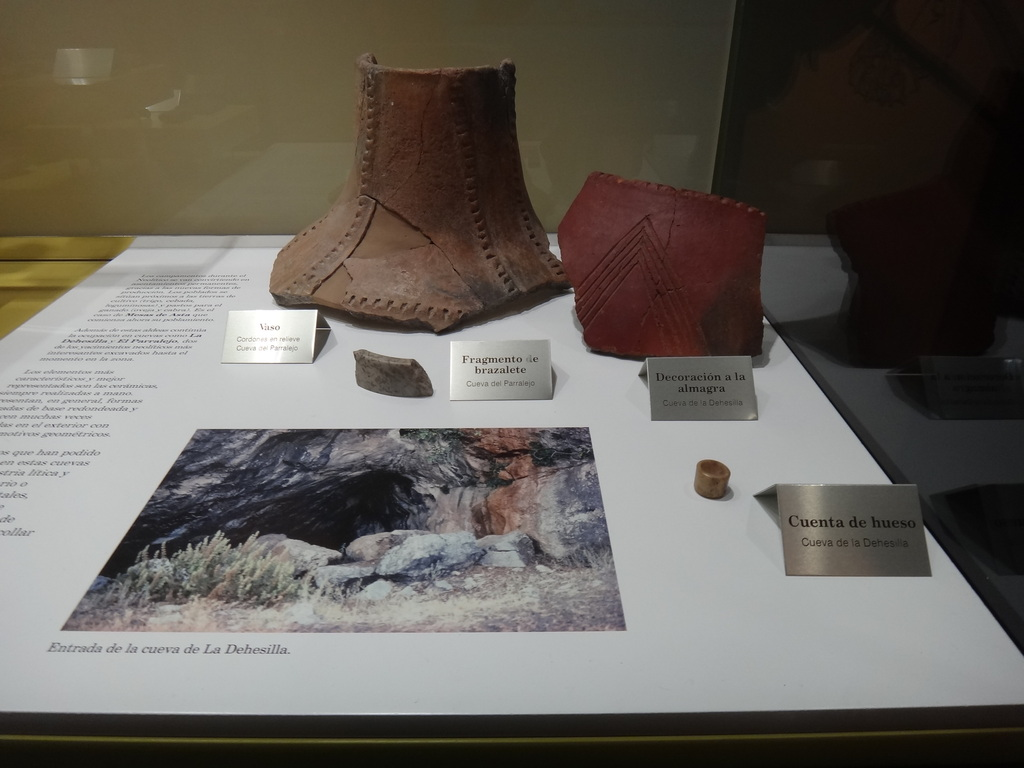

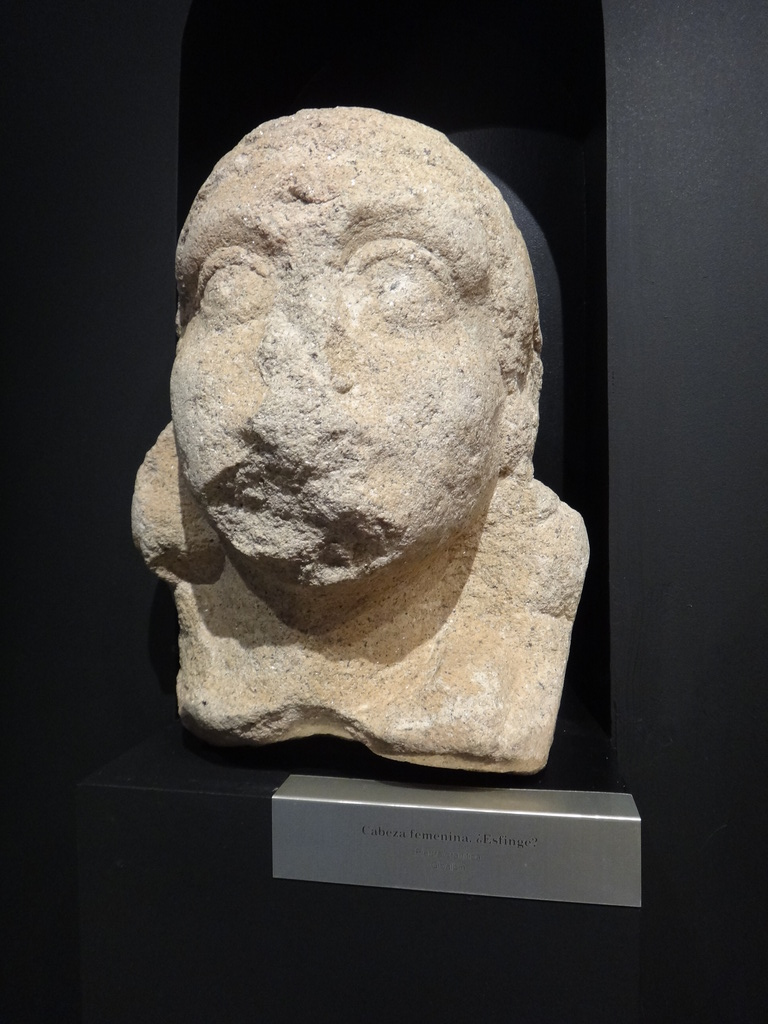

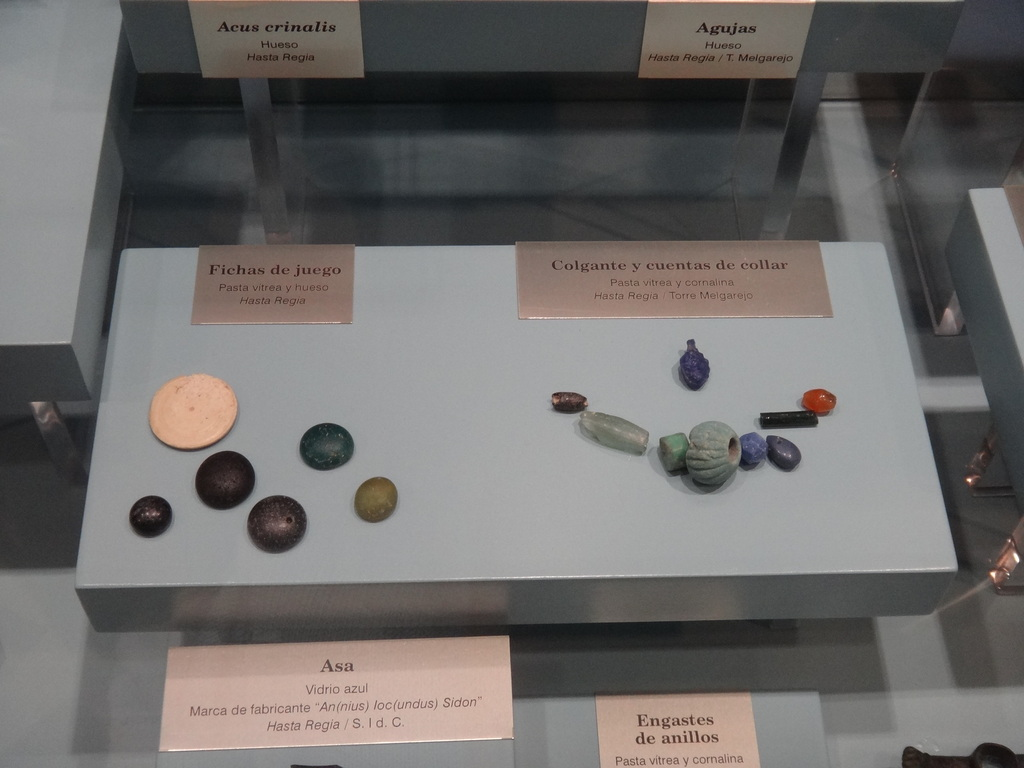

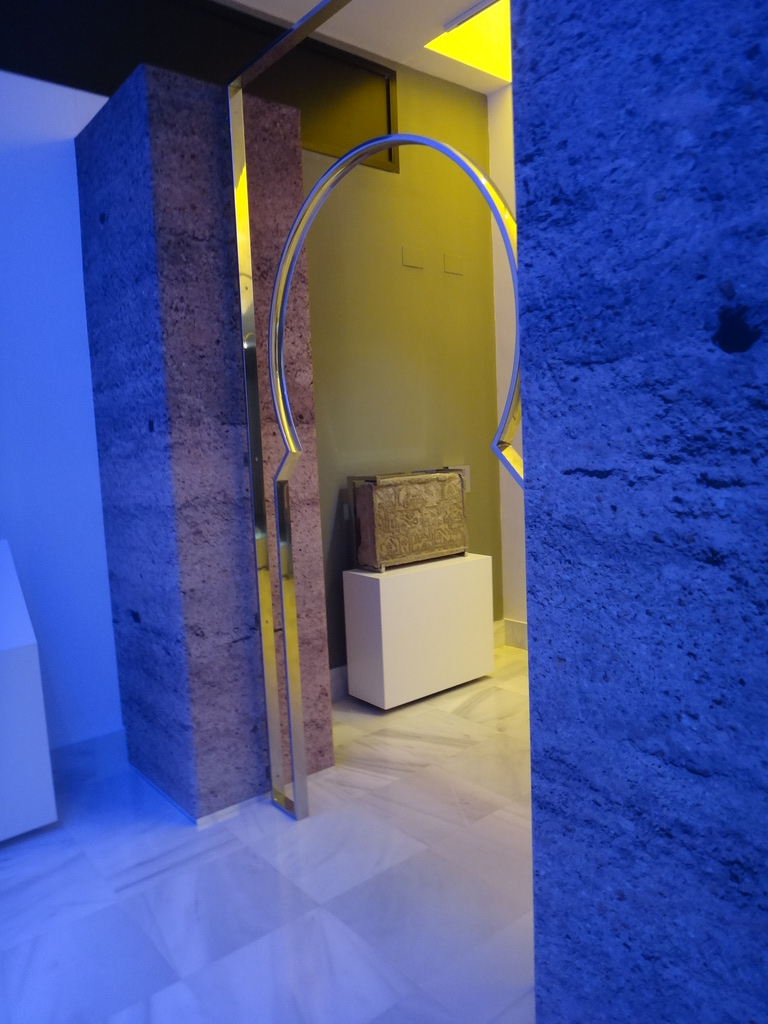

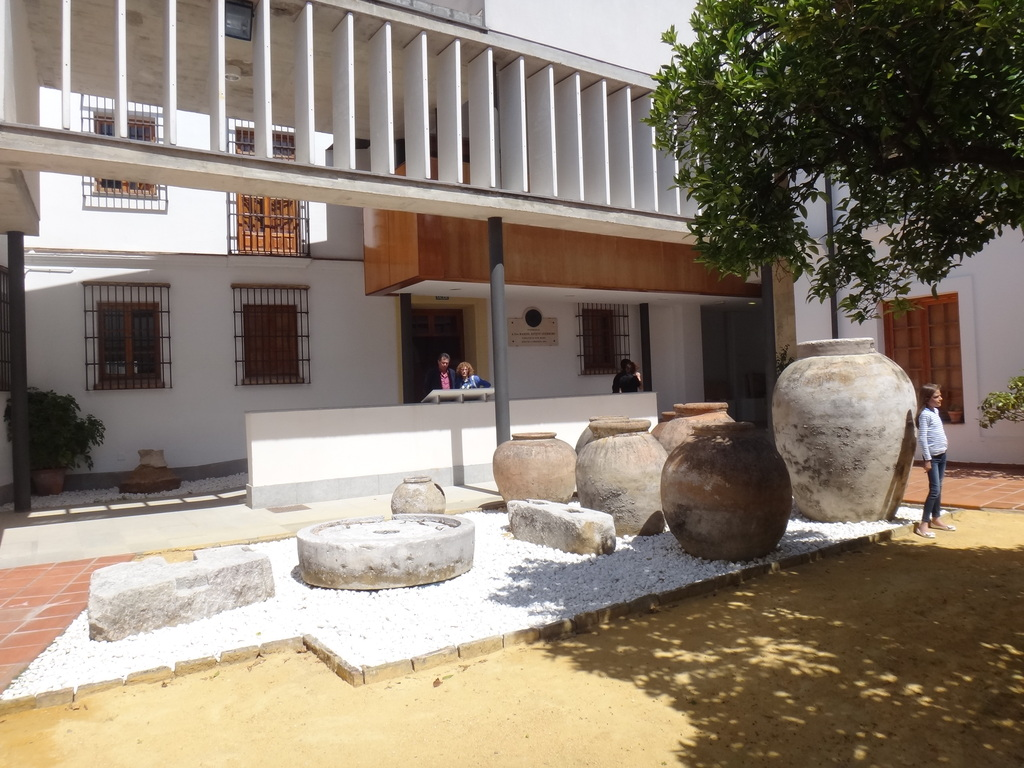

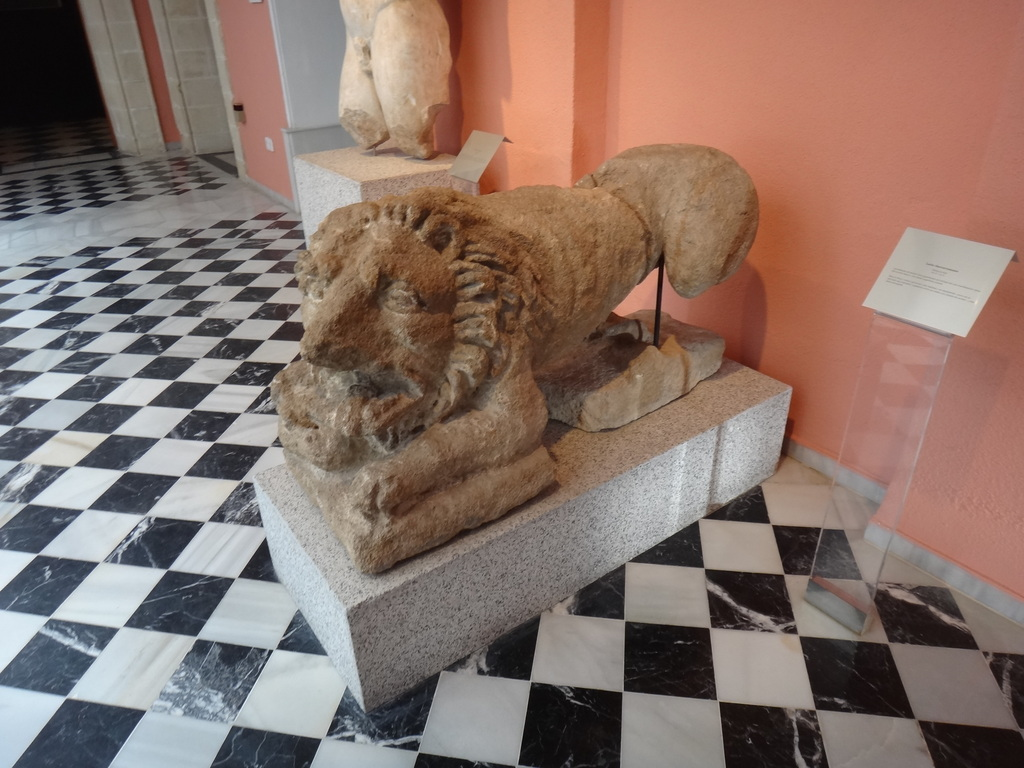

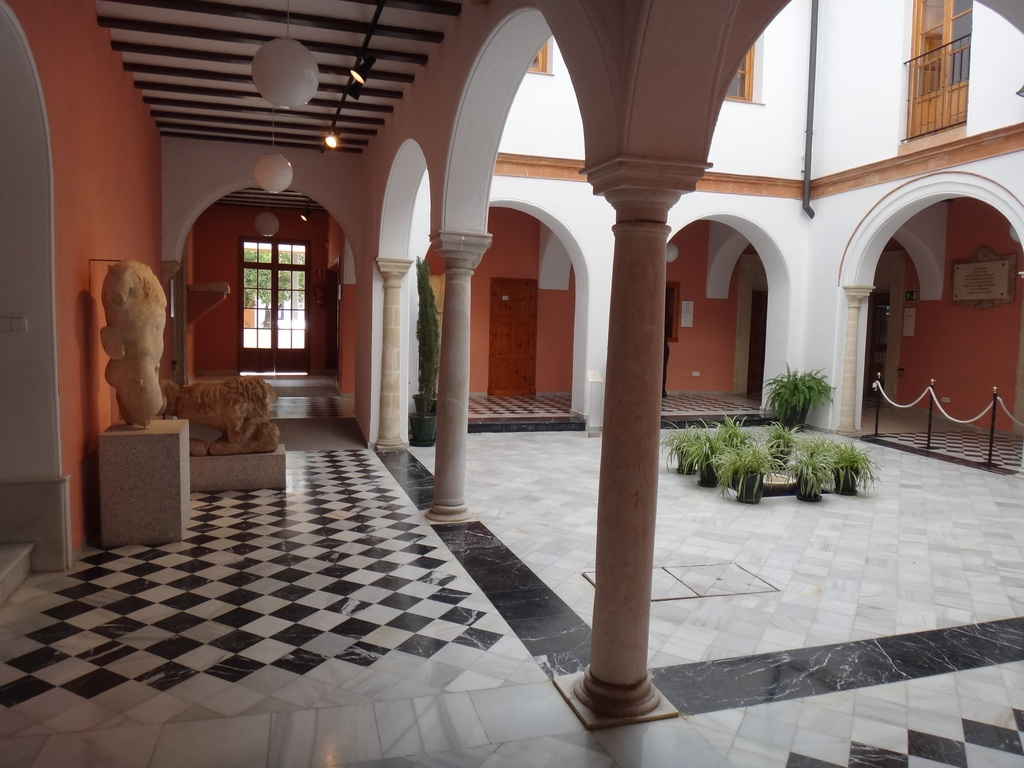

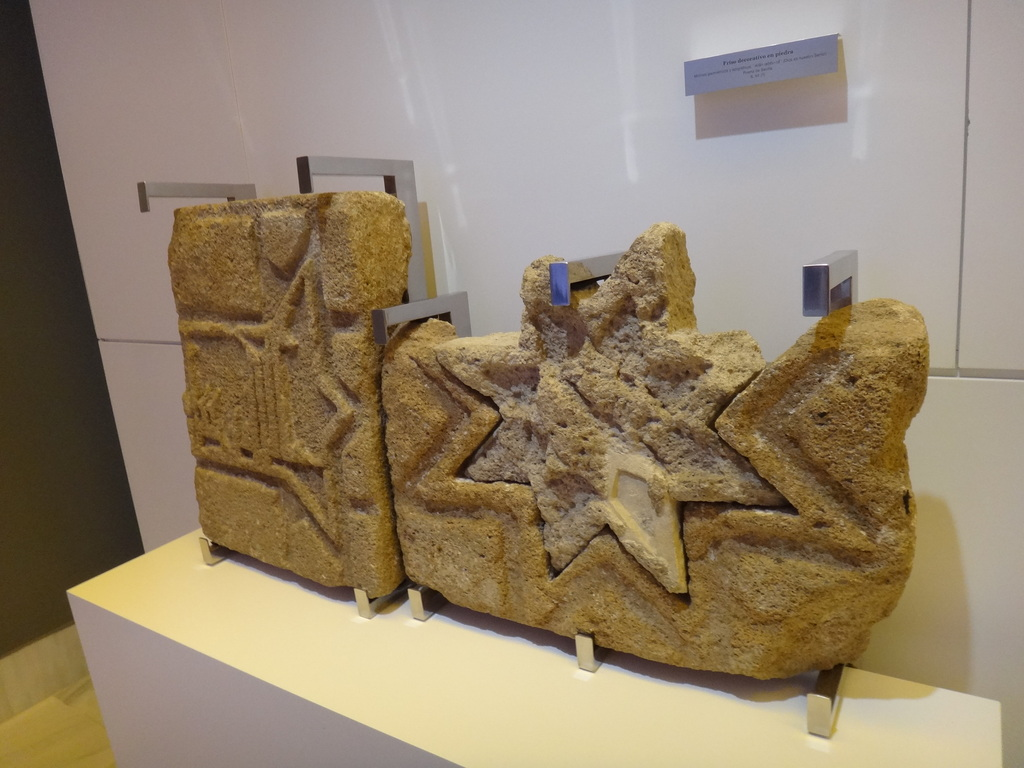

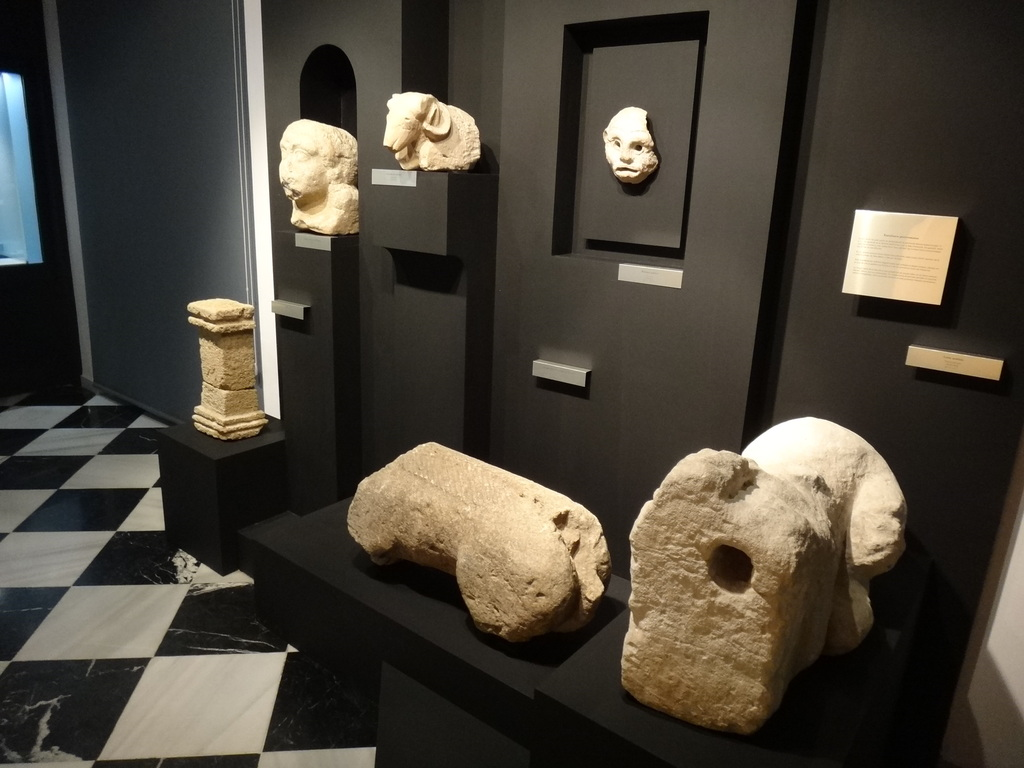

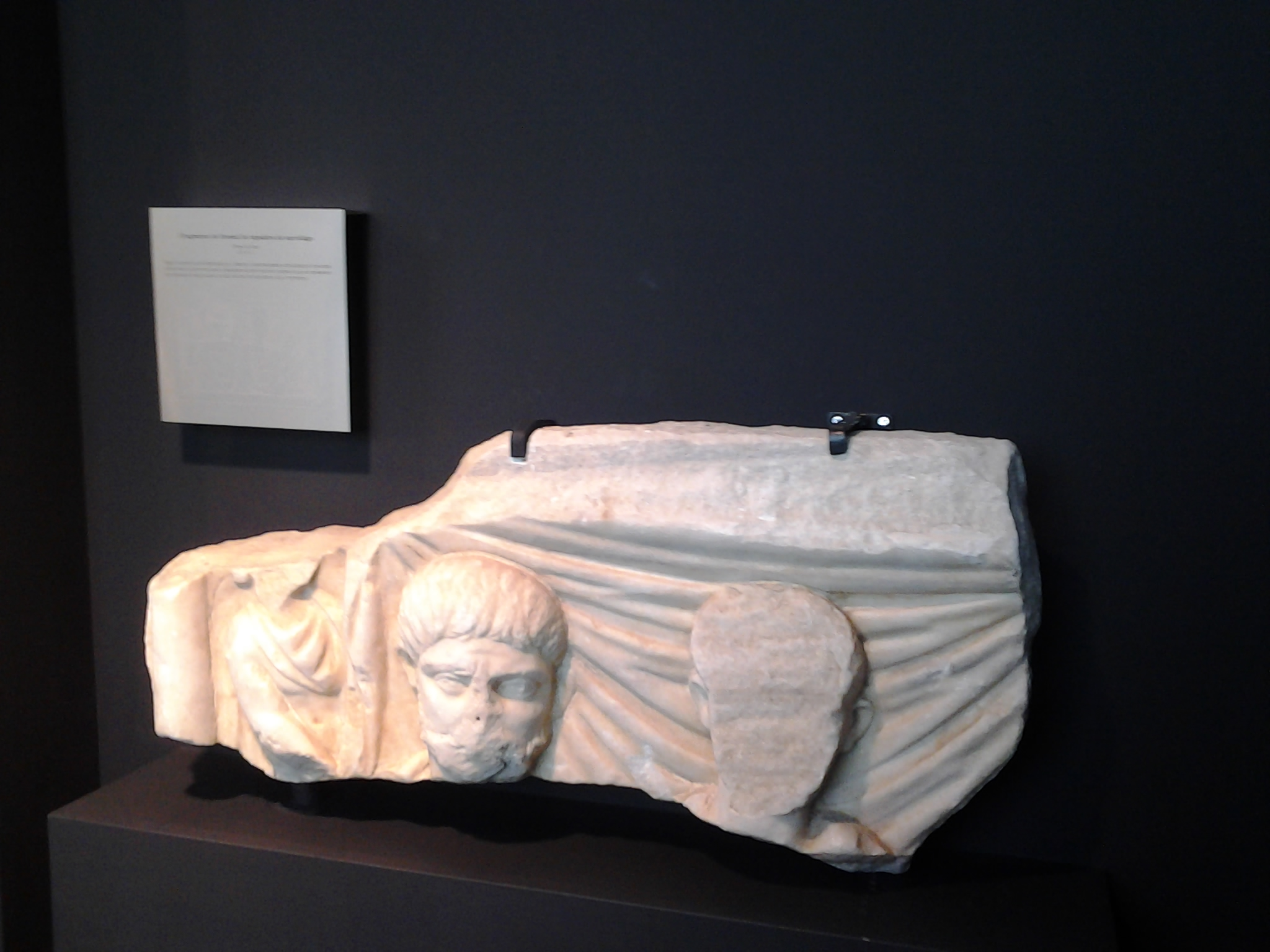

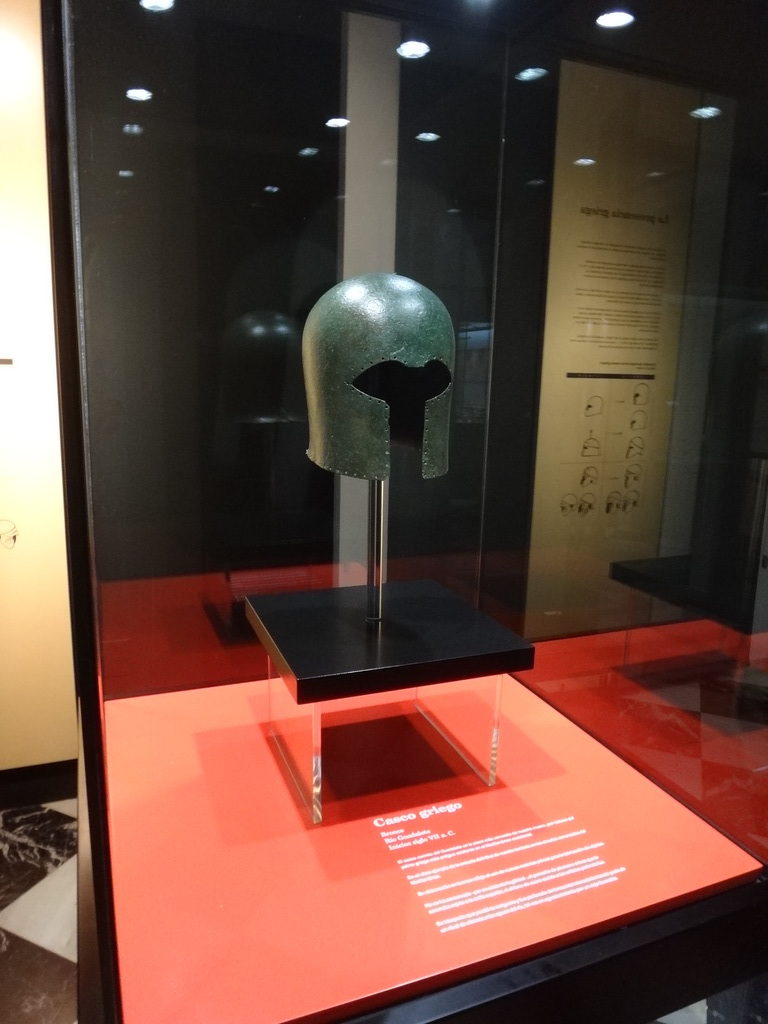

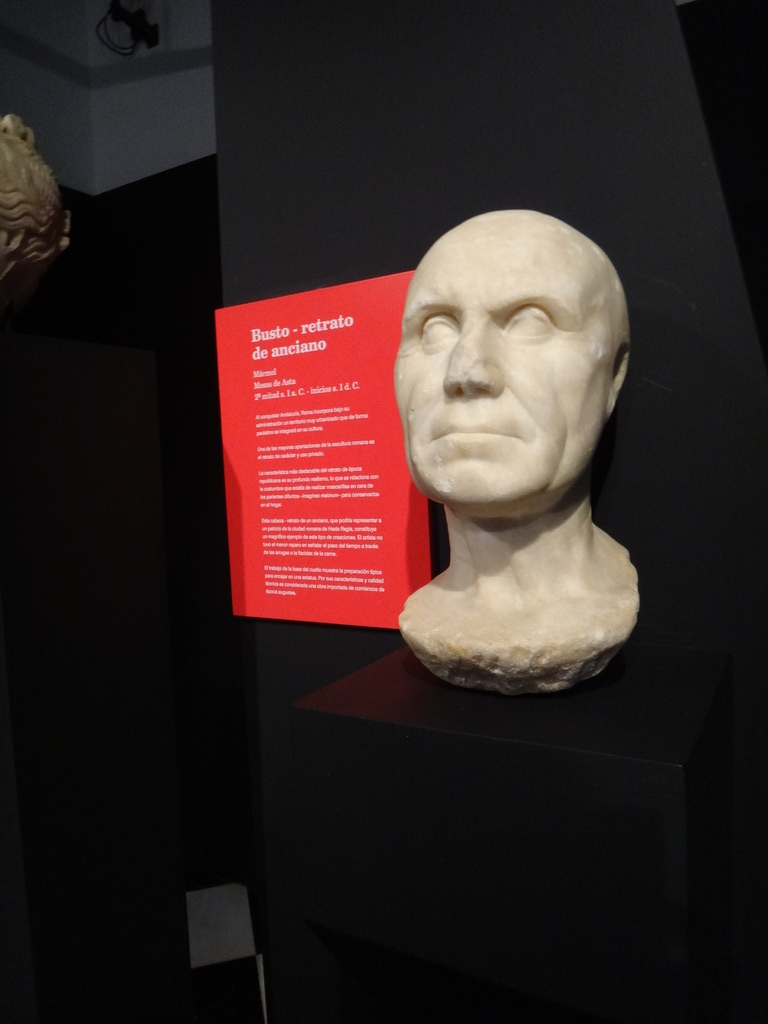

== See also ==
- List of museums in Spain
