= List of Bienes de Interés Cultural in the Province of Cádiz =

This is a list of Bienes de Interés Cultural landmarks in the Province of Cádiz, Spain.

Name	ID	Coordinates	Image
Abrigo de la Huerta de las Pilas			
Abrigo Rancho de Valdechuelo			
Alcalá de los Gazules		36.4618805°N 5.7238891°W	
Alcázar of Jerez de la Frontera	RI-51-0000494	36.6806°N 6.1399°W	
Arco de la Rosa		36.52930017272298, -6.294470672884905	
Arco de los Blanco	RI-51-0001437-00000	36.52833333°N 6.29305556°W	
Arco del Pópulo	RI-51-0007560-00000	36.52916667°N 6.29444444°W	
Arte rupestre del extremo sur de la Península Ibérica			
Baelo Claudia		36.089861°N 5.774611°W	
Baluarte de la Candelaria (Cádiz)			
Baño de la Reina Mora (Jimena de la Frontera)			
Basílica de Santa María de la Asunción	RI-51-0000504	36.74527778°N 5.80638889°W	
Benaocaz		36.7°N 5.4166666666667°W	
Cádiz Cathedral	RI-51-0000493	36.529°N 6.2952°W	
Casa consistorial de San Fernando		36.46472222°N 6.19861111°W	
Casa de la Cadenas			
Casa Vizarrón			
Castillo de Carastas			
Castillo de Fatetar			
Castillo de Gibalbín			
Castillo de Gigonza		36.5522°N 5.83361°W	
Castillo de la Villa (Cádiz)			
Castillo de Matrera	RI-51-0008200-00000	36.807256°N 5.565622°W	
Castillo de Medina-Sidonia			
Castillo de Olvera			
Castillo de San Lorenzo del Puntal			
Castillo de San Romualdo		36.46805556°N 6.19194444°W	
Castillo del Espíritu Santo			
Castle of Alcalá de los Gazules	RI-51-0007541	36.463595°N 5.723262°W	
Castle of Chipiona	RI-51-0007585-00000	36.740911°N 6.437298°W	
Castle of Jimena de la Frontera	RI-51-0000500	36.432246°N 5.455238°W	
Castle of San Sebastián	RI-51-0007575	36.528106°N 6.315614°W	
Castle of Tarifa	RI-51-0000499	36.0117°N 5.6027°W	
Castle of Trebujena	RI-51-0008795	36.870284°N 6.176652°W	
Castle of Zahara de la Sierra	RI-51-0007649	36.838486°N 5.390269°W	
Castle of Zahara de los Atunes and Palace of Jadraza	RI-51-0011064	36.135694°N 5.845934°W	
Charterhouse of Jerez de la Frontera	RI-51-0000004	36.654878°N 6.093522°W	
Church of San Dionisio	RI-51-0001605	36.68333333°N 6.13833333°W	
Church of San Marcos	RI-51-0000496	36.685752°N 6.139092°W	
Church of San Miguel	RI-51-0000497	36.679825°N 6.137432°W	
Church of Santiago	RI-51-0000495	36.687859°N 6.143784°W	
Claustros de Santo Domingo			
Convent of Nuestra Señora del Rosario y Santo Domingo	RI-51-0005344	36.528757°N 6.290072°W	
Convento de Caños Santos			
Convento del Corpus Christi (Bornos)		36.816858333333°N 5.7460388888889°W	
Cueva Abejera			
Cueva de Atlanterra			
Cueva de Betín			
Cueva de la Carrahola			
Cueva de la Horadada			
Cueva de la Máscara			
Cueva de la Mesa del Helechoso			
Cueva de la Motilla			
Cueva de la Taconera			
Cueva de los Arrieros			
Cueva de los Ladrones			
Cueva de los Números			
Cueva de Palomas I			
Cueva de Palomas II			
Cueva de Palomas III			
Cueva de Palomas IV			
Cueva de Ranchiles I			
Cueva del Agua			
Cueva del Barranco del Arca			
Cueva del Caballo			
Cueva del Cambulló			
Cueva del Cancho			
Cueva del Corchadillo			
Cueva del Extremo Sur			
Cueva del Helechar I			
Cueva del Helechar II			
Cueva del Magro			
Cueva del Pajarraco			
Cueva del Realillo			
Cueva del Risco del Tajo Gordo			
Cueva del Sol			
Cueva del Sumidero I			
Cueva del Sumidero II			
Cueva del Toro			
Cuevas de Chinchilla			
Cuevas del Chorreón Salado			
Cuevas del Obispo			
El Piruétano			
Ermita de Santa Ana		36.414°N 6.15°W	
Faro de Camarinal	RI-51-0007634-00000	36.090164°N 5.810511°W	
Fort of El Tolmo		36.053680°N 5.482762°W	
Fort Matagorda		36.514421°N 6.250112°W	
House of Vizarrón	RI-51-0011421	36.594917°N 6.226906°W	
Iglesia de la Merced (Sanlúcar de Barrameda)		36.776361111111°N 6.3545666666667°W	
Iglesia de los Desamparados (Sanlúcar de Barrameda)		36.778155555556°N 6.3541972222222°W	
Iglesia de Nuestra Señora de la O (Sanlúcar de Barrameda)		36.7761°N 6.35319°W	
Iglesia de San José		36.52888889°N 6.19055556°W	
Iglesia de San Juan Bautista		36.418034°N 6.146211°W	
Iglesia de San Lorenzo Mártir (Cádiz)			
Iglesia de San Mateo		36.684541666667°N 6.145725°W	
Iglesia de Santa María la Coronada (Medina-Sidonia)		36.457977777778°N 5.9256638888889°W	
Iglesia de Santo Domingo (Jerez de la Frontera)		36.686266666667°N 6.1368444444444°W	
Iglesia del Oratorio de San Felipe Neri	RI-51-0000091	36.5328°N 6.2997°W	
Iglesia Mayor de San Pedro y San Pablo		36.46583333°N 6.19638889°W	
Jerez de la Frontera Cathedral	RI-51-0000498	36.682007°N 6.141089°W	
La Línea de la Concepción Bull Ring	RI-51-0011557	36.168°N 5.347°W	
La Roca con Letras			
Las Covachas de Sanlúcar de Barrameda			
Lines of Contravallation of Gibraltar	RI-51-0008999	36.160148°N 5.345666°W	
Monasterio del Cuervo		36.27984167°N 5.66339722°W	
Monastery of the Victory	RI-51-0004322-00000	36.60566111°N 6.21746667°W	
Muralla de Jerez de la Frontera			
Museo Arqueológico Municipal de Jerez de la Frontera	RI-51-0001340	36.684898°N 6.144798°W	
Museum of Cádiz		36.53493611°N 6.29638889°W	
Necrópolis de Los Algarbes			
Old City Hall of Jerez de la Frontera	RI-51-0001135	36.683116°N 6.13872°W	
Palace of Marqués de Montana	RI-51-0005370	36.68716°N 6.136922°W	
Palacio de los Marqueses de Recaño			
Palacio de Orleans-Borbón		36.775905555556°N 6.3542488888889°W	
Peñón de la Cueva			
Priory Church, El Puerto de Santa María	RI-51-0004729-00000	36.59982222°N 6.22887778°W	
Puerta de Rota			
Roman fish salting factory		36.12555556°N 5.44388889°W	
Roman kilns of El Rinconcillo			
Spa of Nuestra Señora de la Palma y del Real	RI-51-0005281	36.53045°N 6.305542°W	
Tajo de las Figuras			
Teatro Villamarta	ARI-51-0006833-00000	36.682836111111°N 6.1351722222222°W	
Tempul Castle		36.641666666667°N 5.6758333333333°W	
Torre Alta		36°27′49″N 6°12′21″W	
Torre de la Peña		36.05694444°N 5.65916667°W	
Torre de Trafalgar		36.183083°N 6.035613°W	
Torre del Fraile	RI-51-0011391-00000	36.0575°N 5.45265°W	
Torre del Reloj		36.418216666667°N 6.1462388888889°W	
Torre Nueva de Guadiaro	RI-51-0007628	36.29448583°N 5.27496883°W	
Torregorda	RI-51-0007573	36.46020278°N 6.25286944°W	
Tower of San Dionisio	RI-51-0004318	36.683601°N 6.138427°W	
Tower of Tajo	RI-51-0011399	36.178897222222°N 5.9728666666667°W	
Walls of Vejer de la Frontera	RI-51-0007645	36.253523°N 5.962707°W	
