= Church of San Dionisio (Jerez de la Frontera) =

Historic site in Andalusia, Spain

- Iglesia de San Dionisio (Spanish)
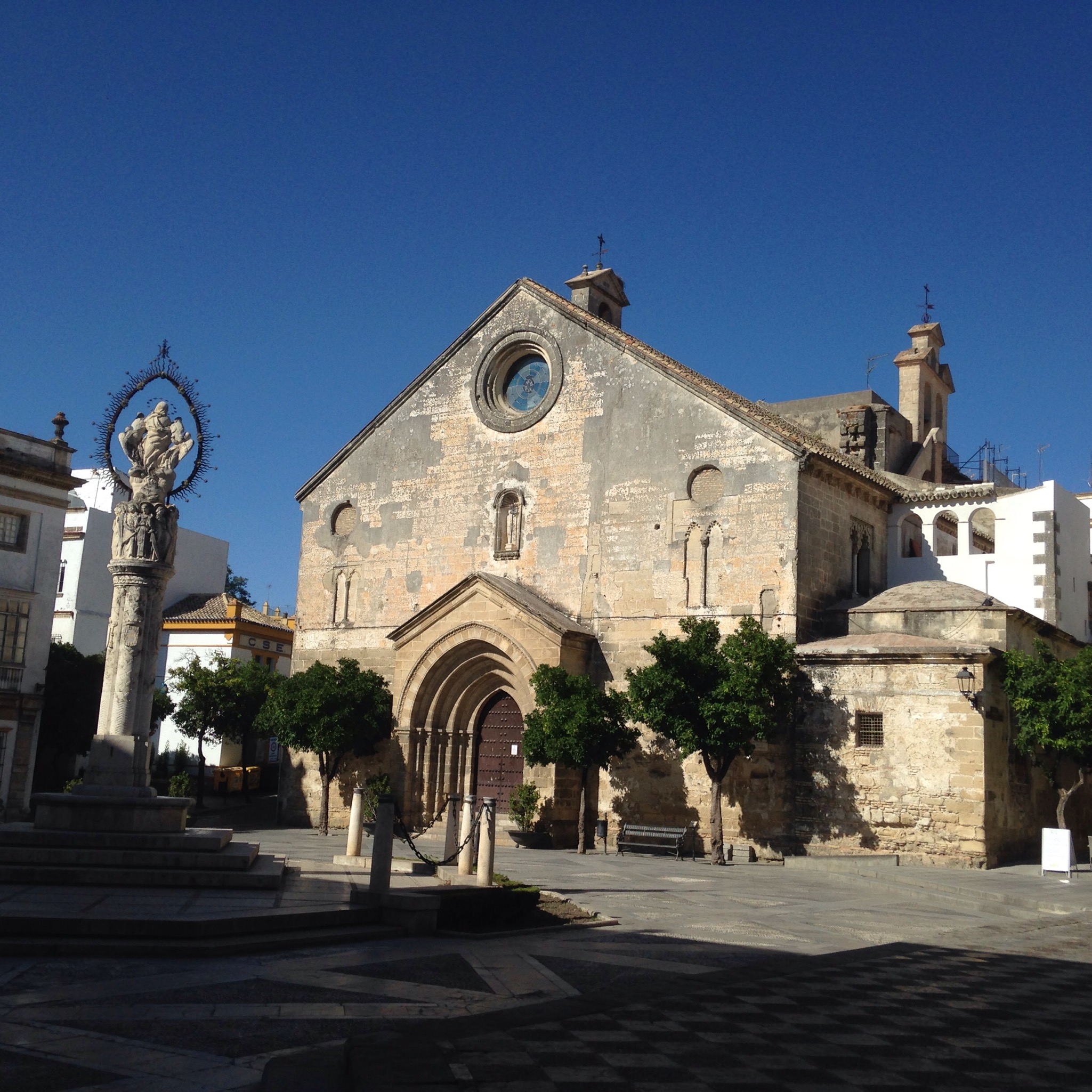

- Location within Spain
- 36.683408°N 6.138549°W
- Location: Jerez de la Frontera, Spain

History
- Built: late 15th century

Site notes
- Architectural style: Gothic-Mudéjar style

Spanish Cultural Heritage
- Official name: Iglesia de San Dionisio
- Type: Non-movable
- Criteria: Monument
- Designated: 1964
- Reference no.: RI-51-0001605

The Church of San Dionisio (Spanish: Iglesia de San Dionisio) is a church located in Jerez de la Frontera, Andalusia, Spain. It was built in the late 15th century in Gothic-Mudéjar style, although its interior was later renovated in Baroque style (18th century) by architects Diego Antonio Díaz and Pedro de Silva. It was declared Bien de Interés Cultural in 1964.

== Description ==
The parish was established by Alfonso X the Wise in the name of Dionysius the Areopagite as the city was turned to Christian rule on Saint Denis's Day in 1264.

The church has a basilica plan, divided into three naves by tall and simple pillars adorned with Almohad decorations. The arcades (aside from those near the high altar) are ogival. The naves end with apses with Baroque altars, including the high altar which dates to the pre-Baroque renovation.

The side chapels are in Baroque style. The chapel of the Christ of the Water includes an image of Jesus from the 15th century. The tower known as Torre de la Atalaya was also built in the fifteenth century. Although this is attached to the church it was a civilian construction intended to serve as a watchtower for both fires and attack and to hold the town's clock. The tower has been separately listed from the church as being of cultural interest. The tower was first mentioned in 1447 and the clock was installed in 1454 and the tower was first used as a watchtower in 1484.

== Gallery ==
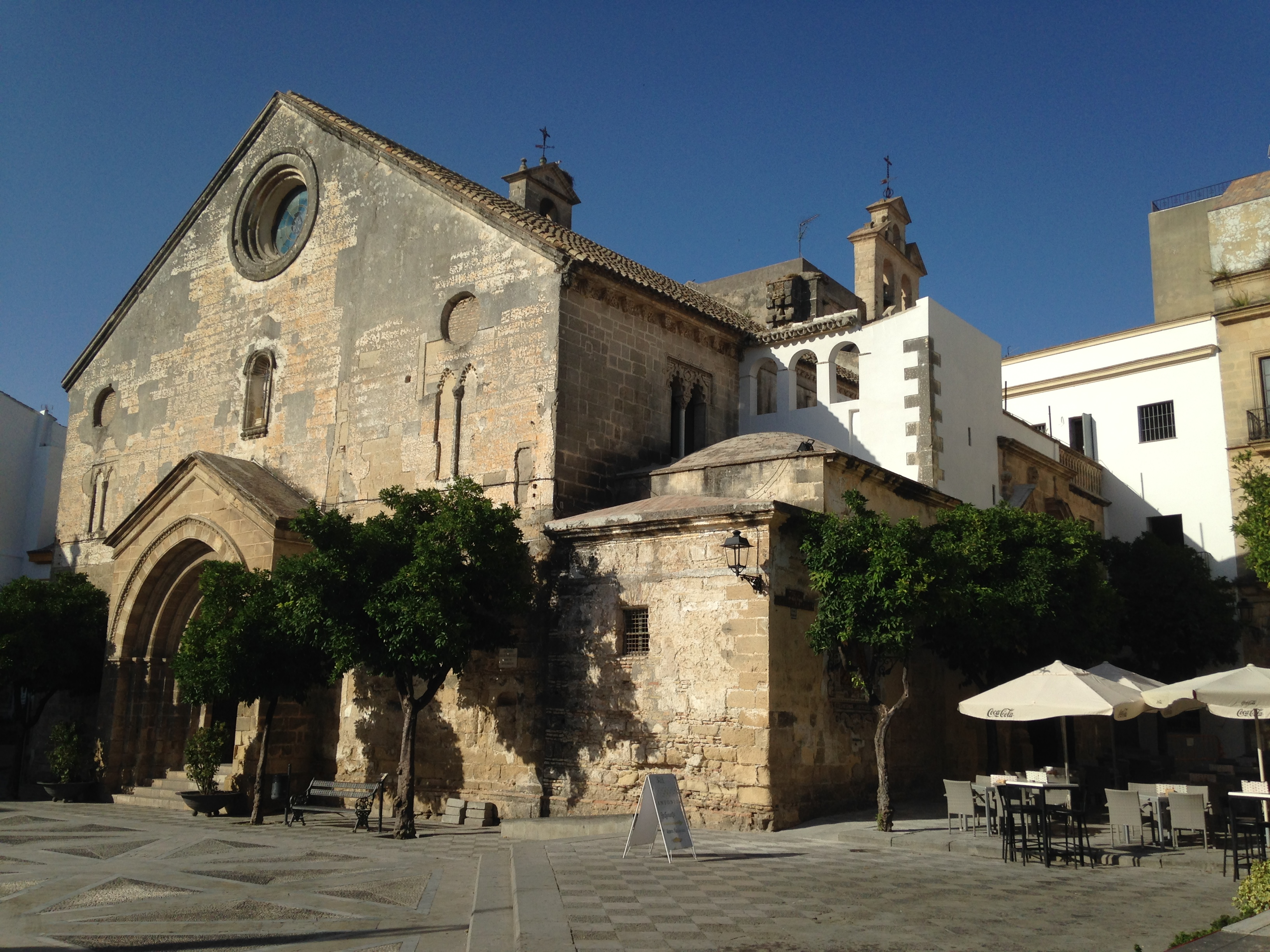
S. D.

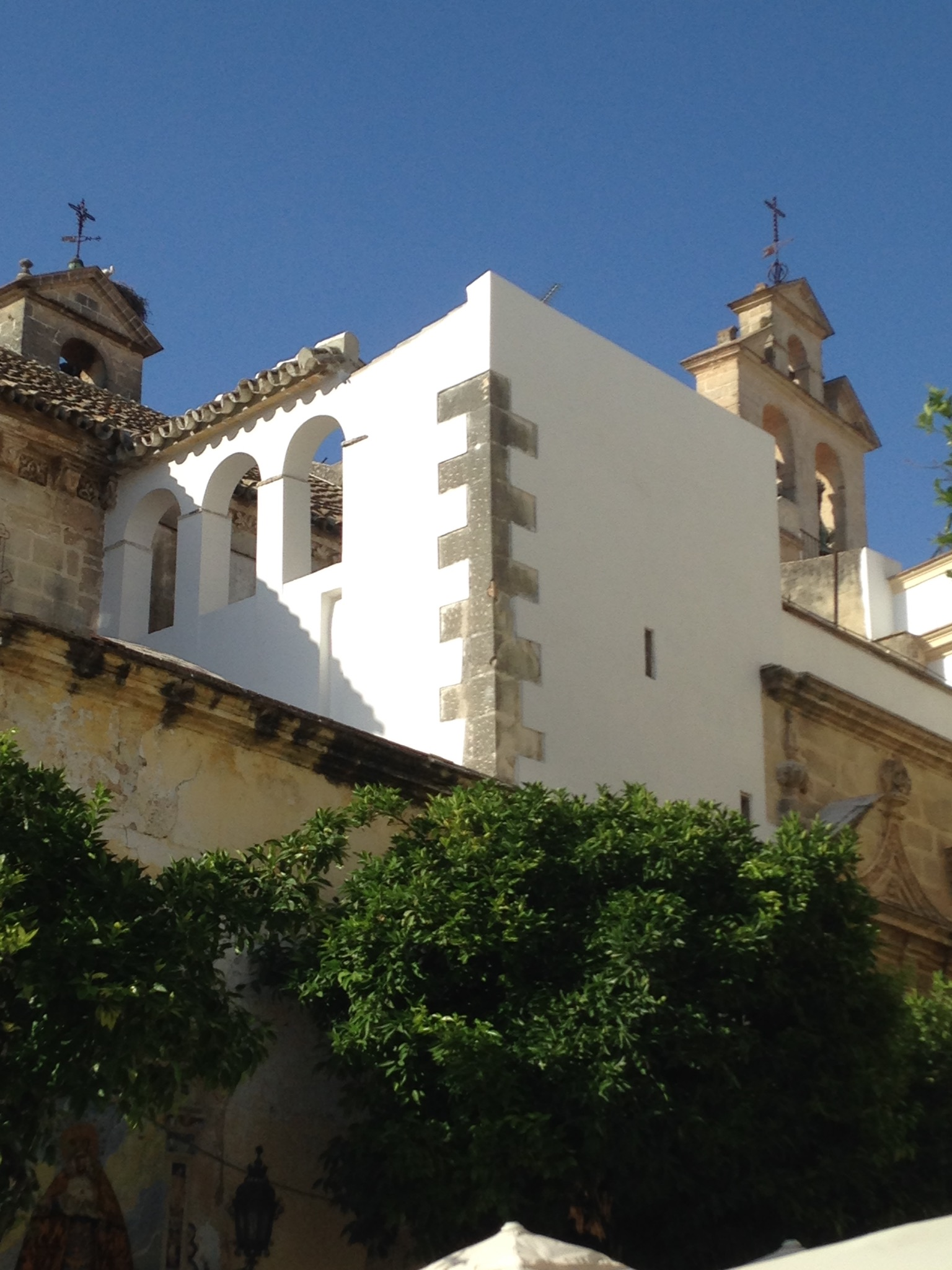
Detalle del lateral

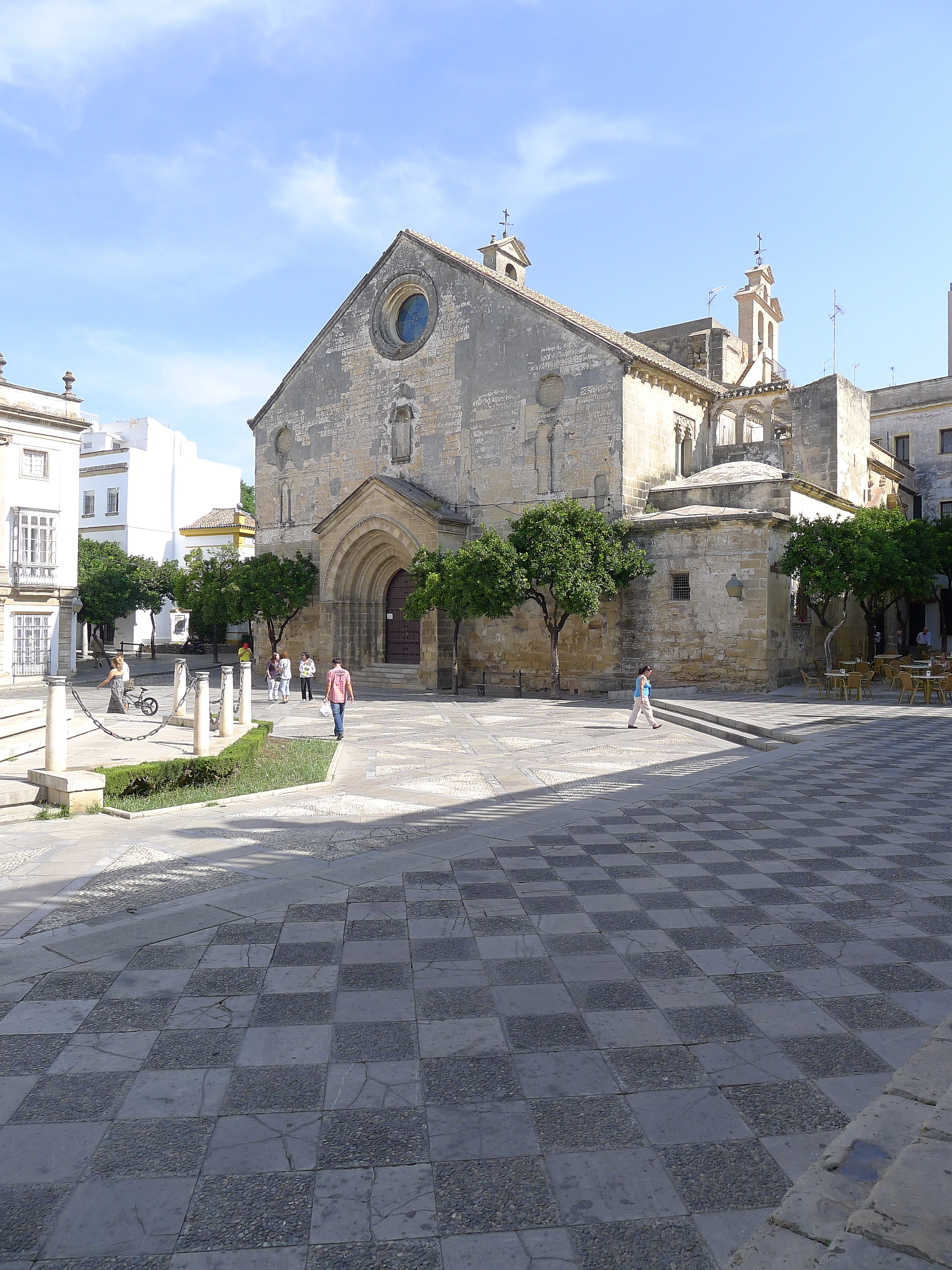
Iglesia desde la Plaza de la Asunción

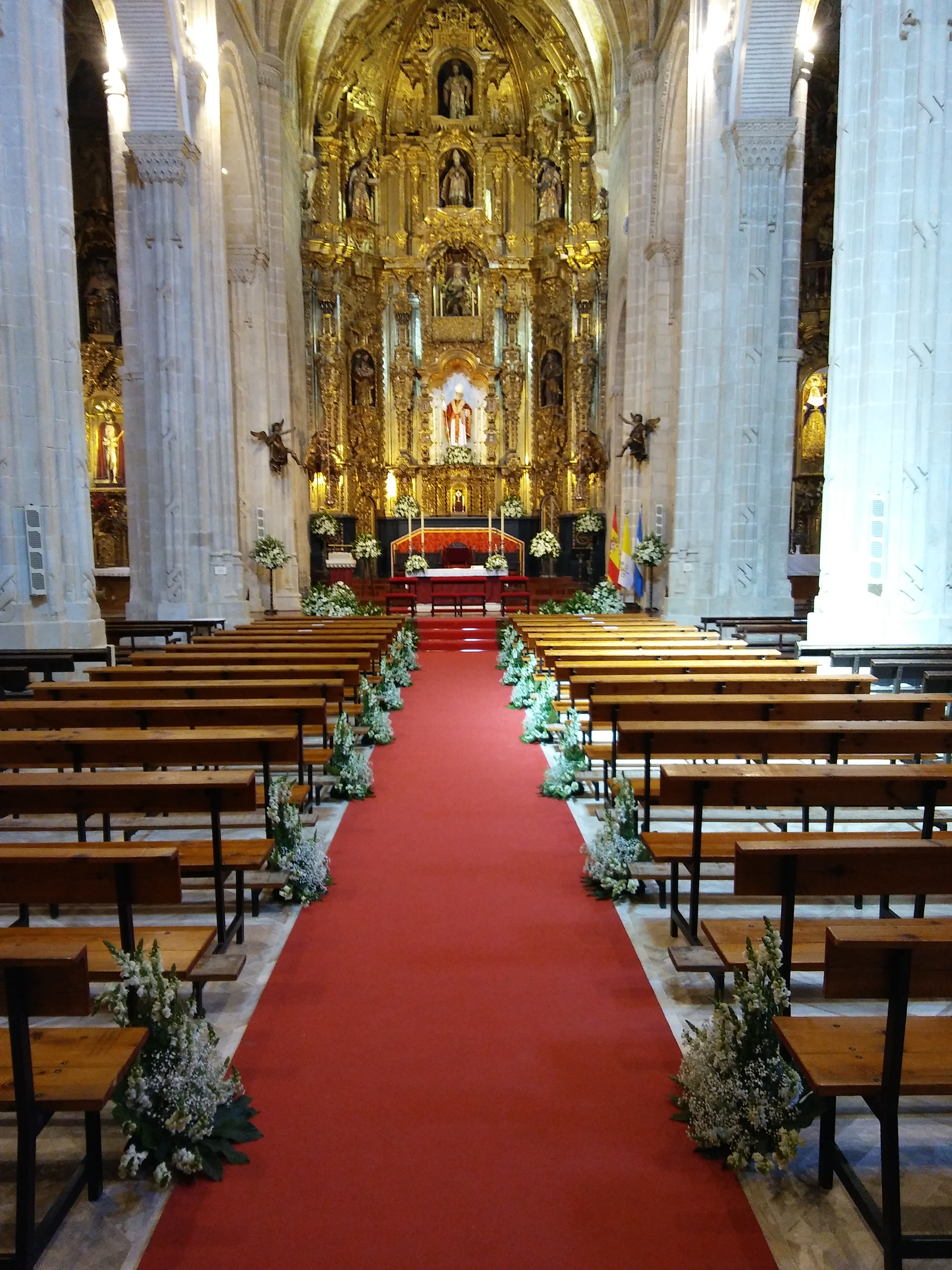
Interior Nave Central

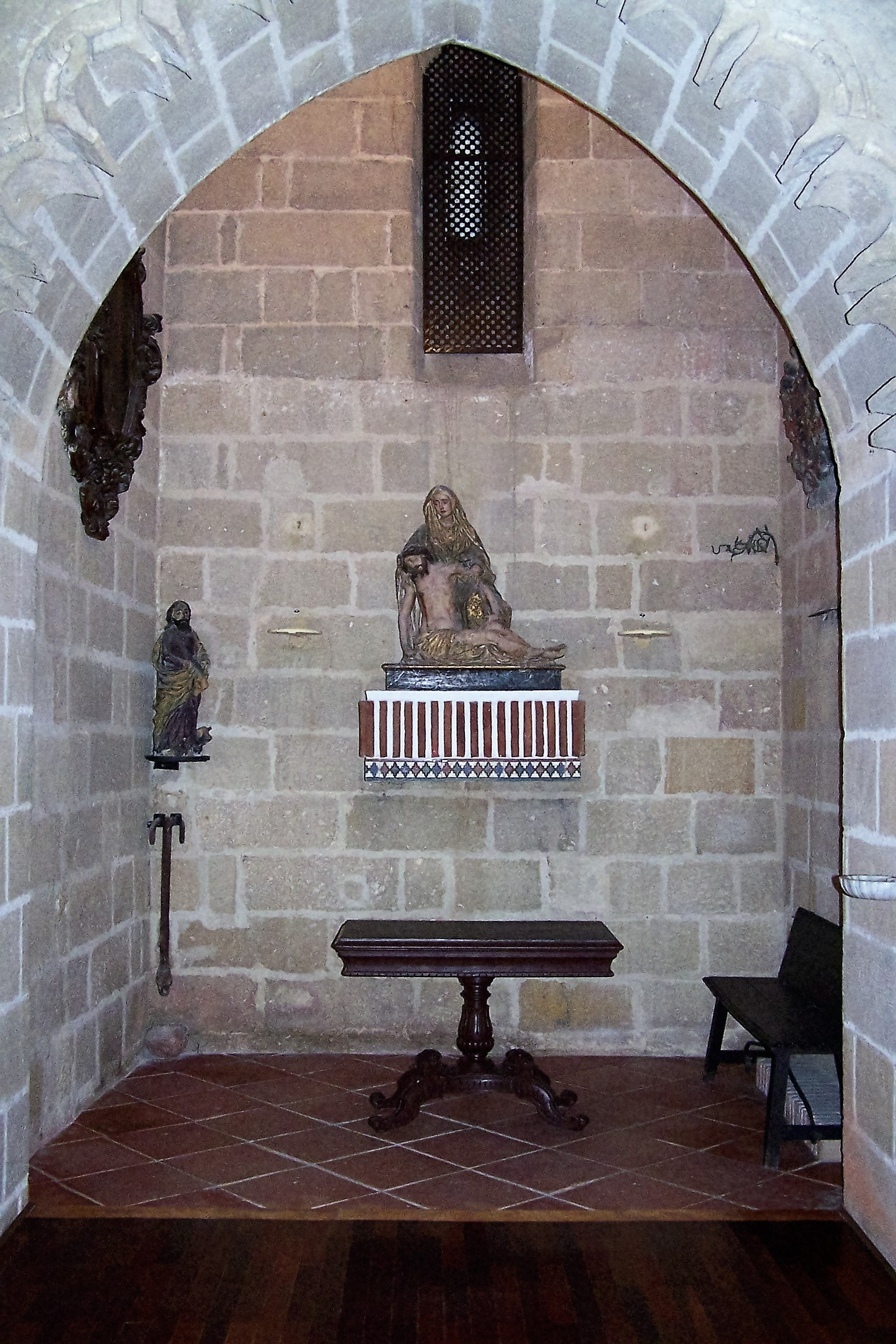
Capilla de la Torre de la Atalaya

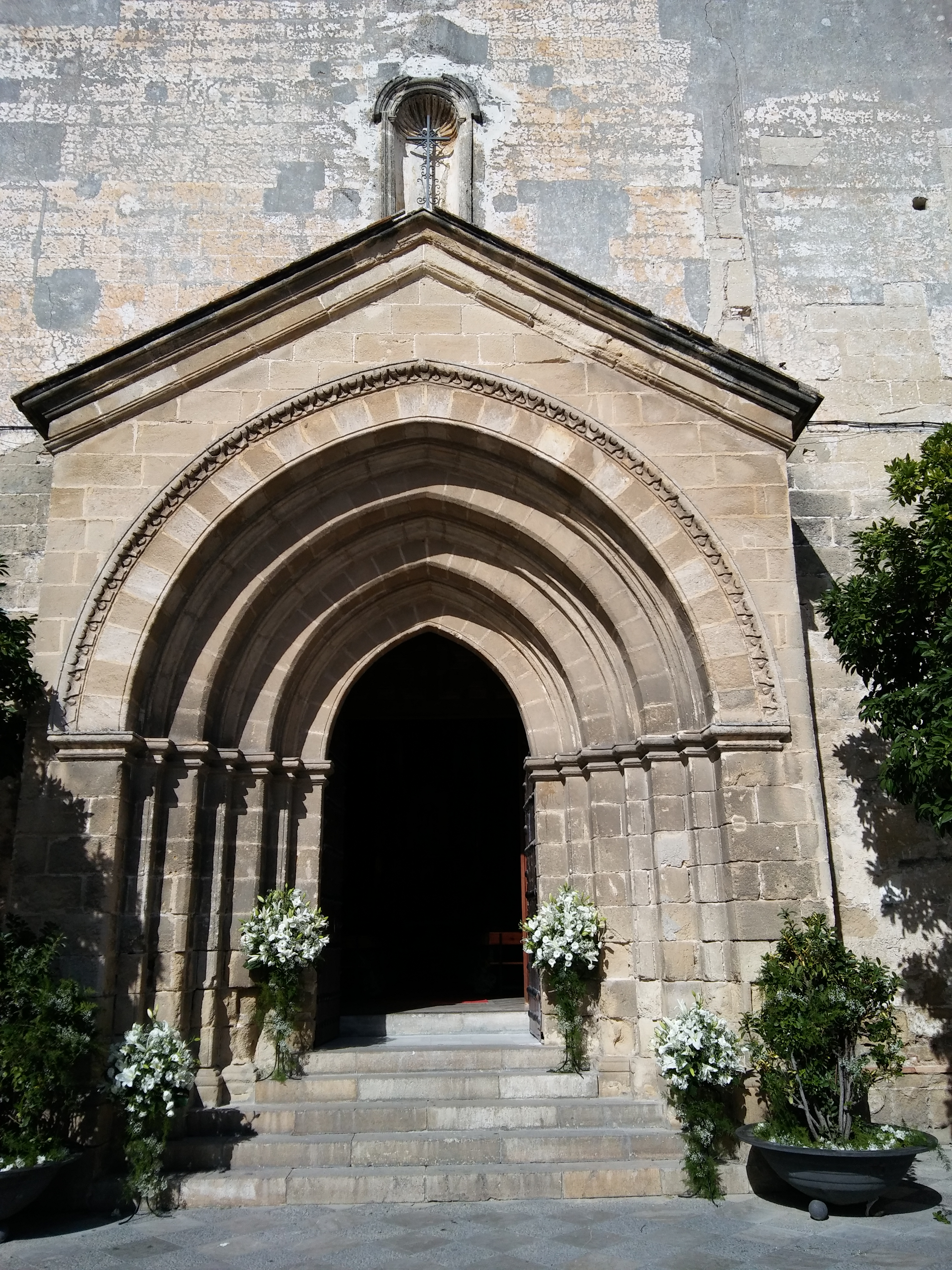
Puerta Principal

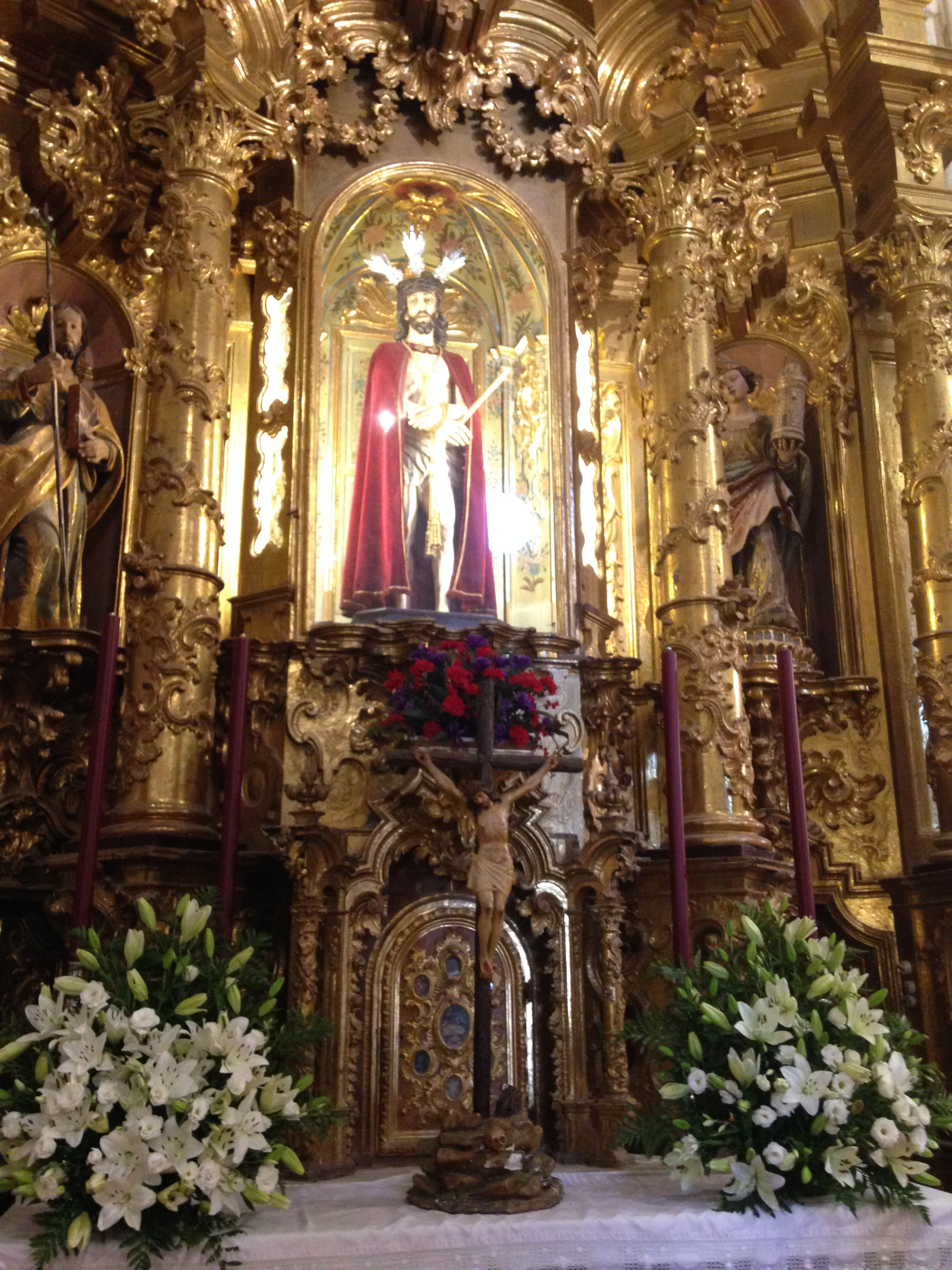
Imagen Ecce Homo

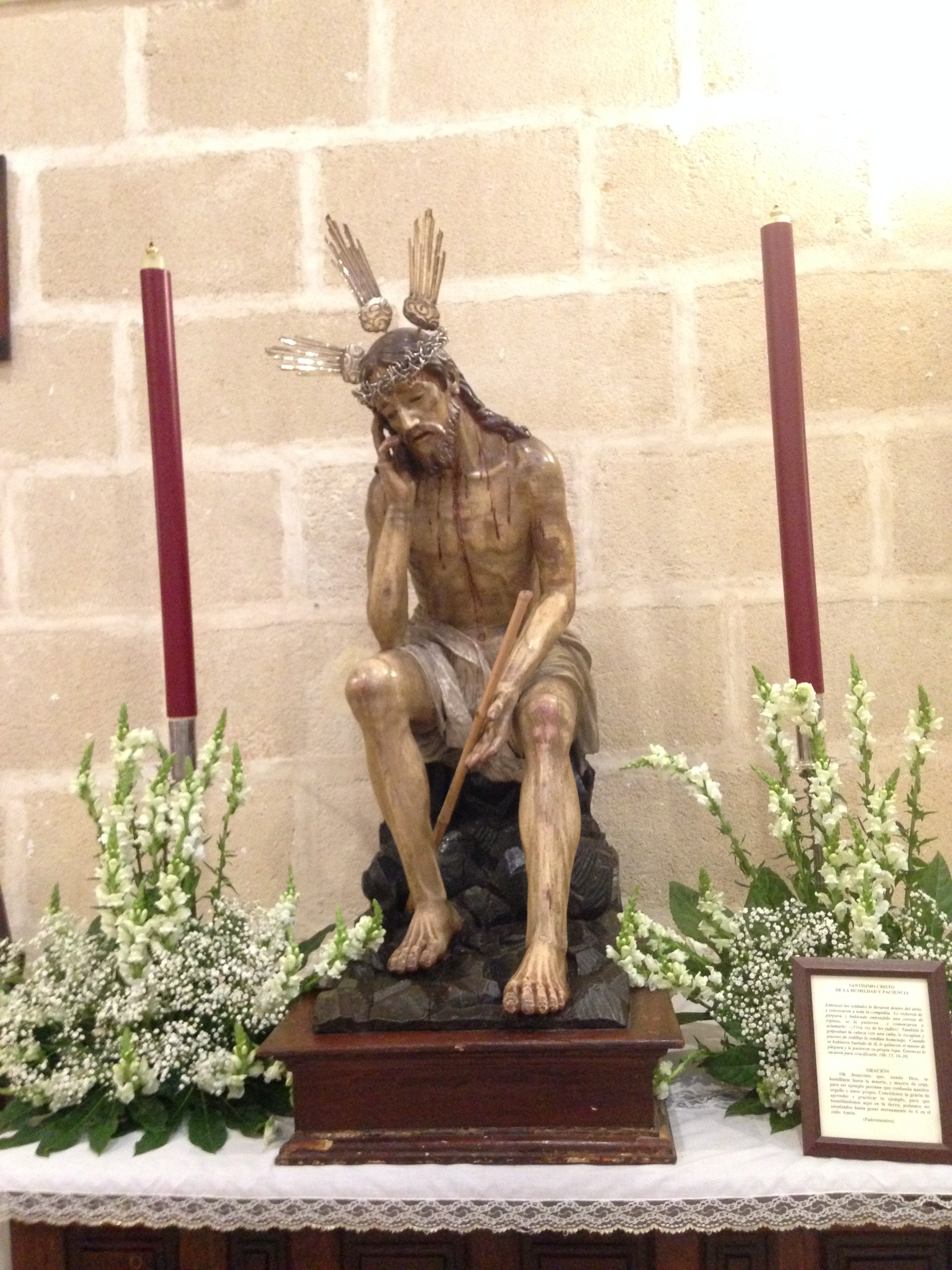
Imagen Humildad y Paciencia

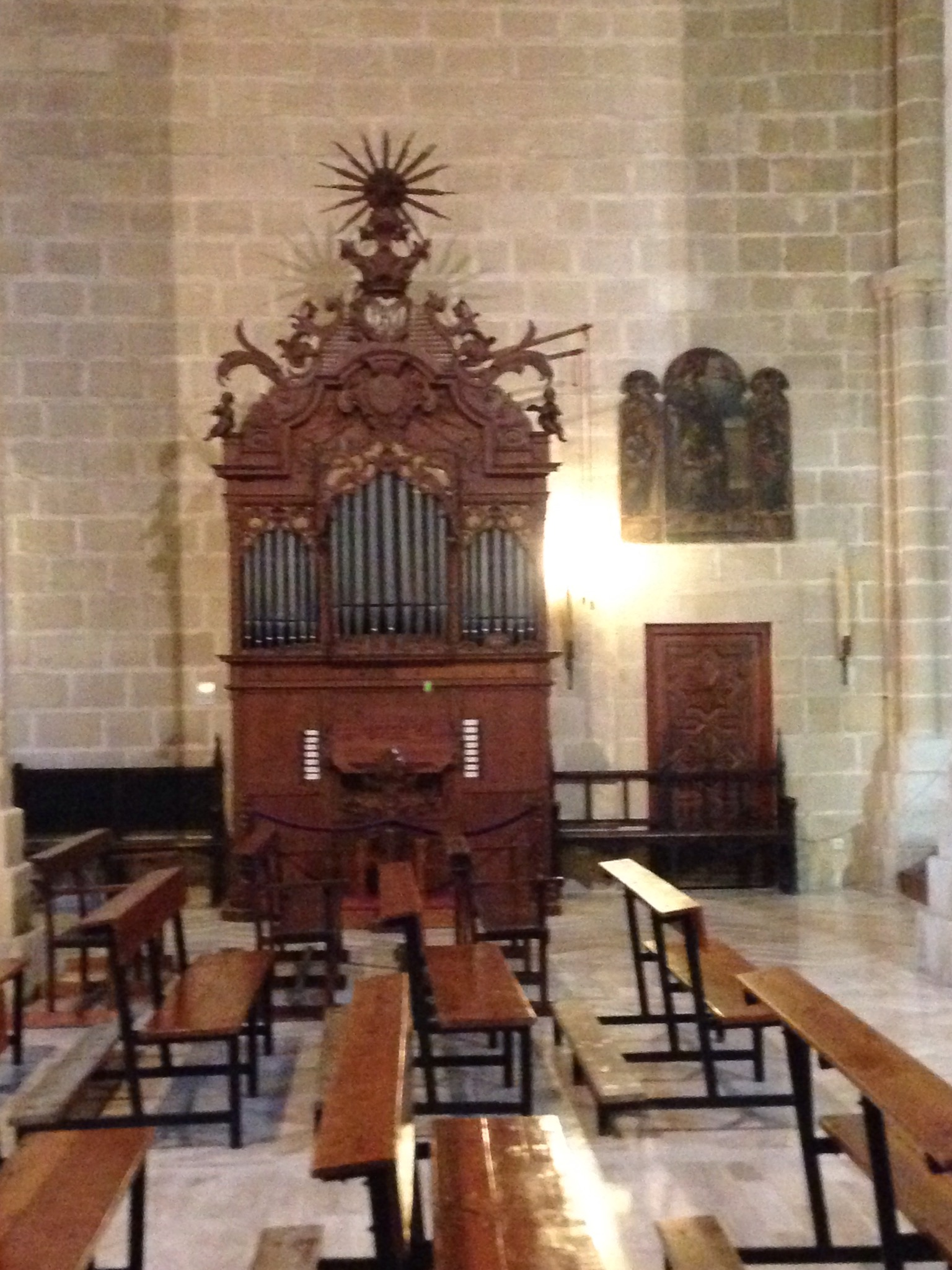
Organo

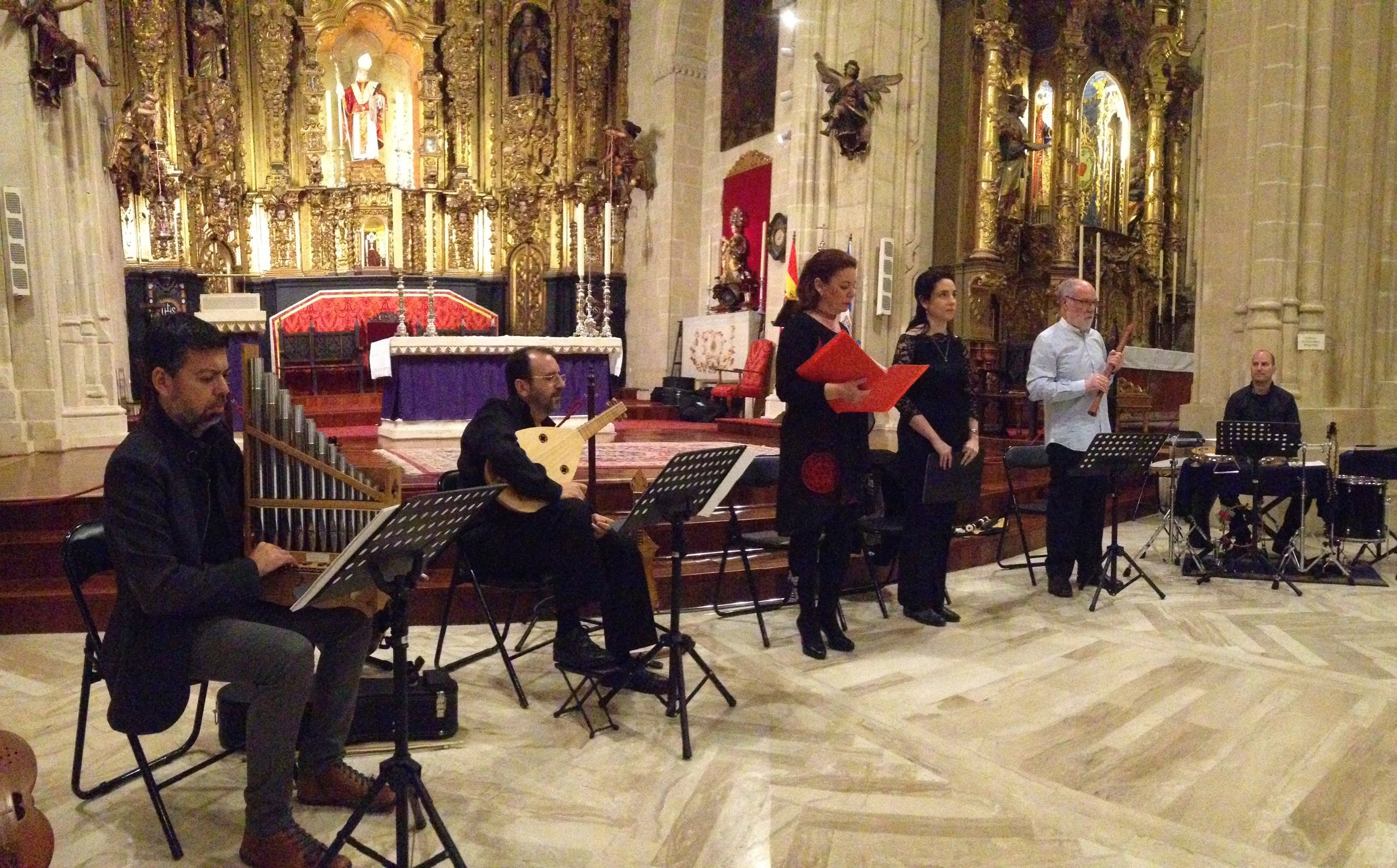
Concierto Mudejar

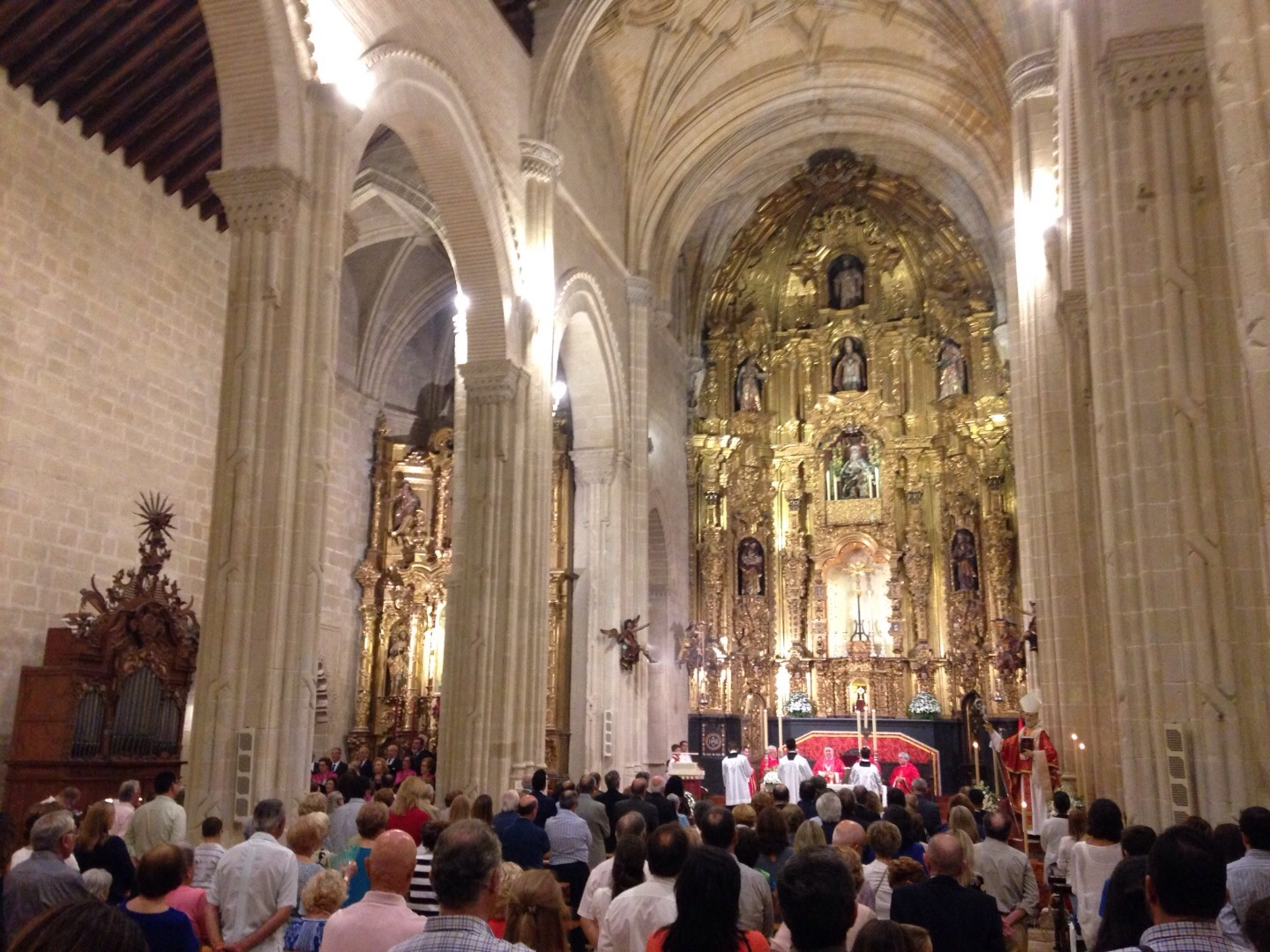
Momentos de la Bendicion de la imagen

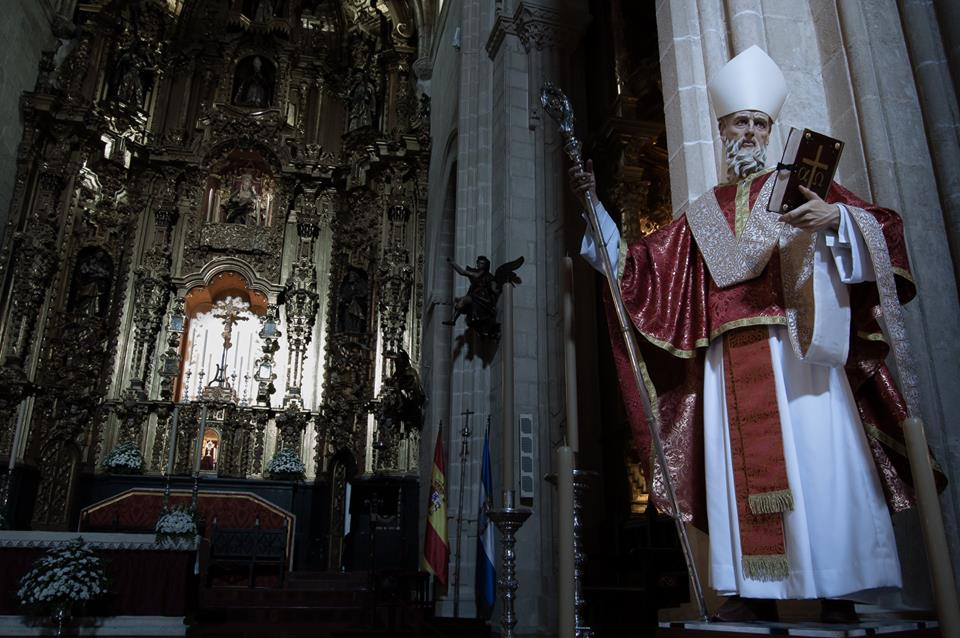

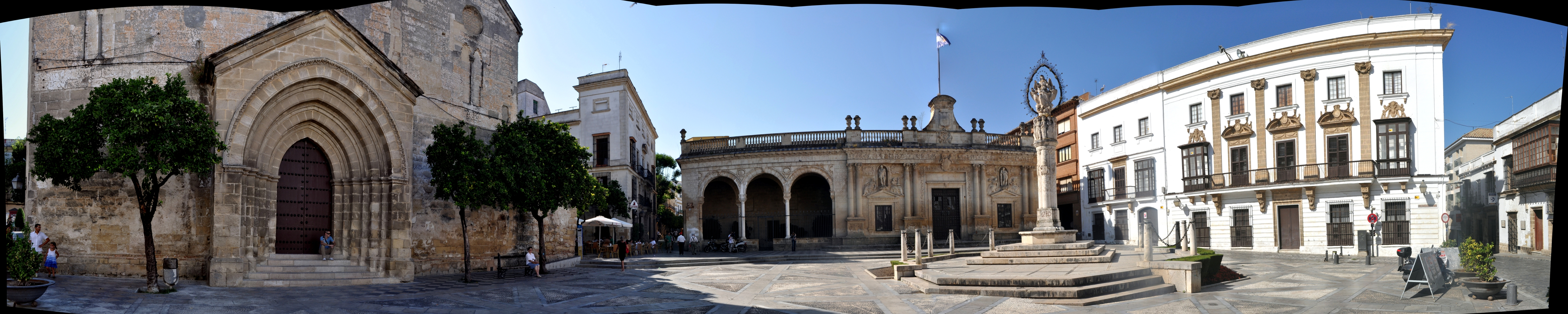

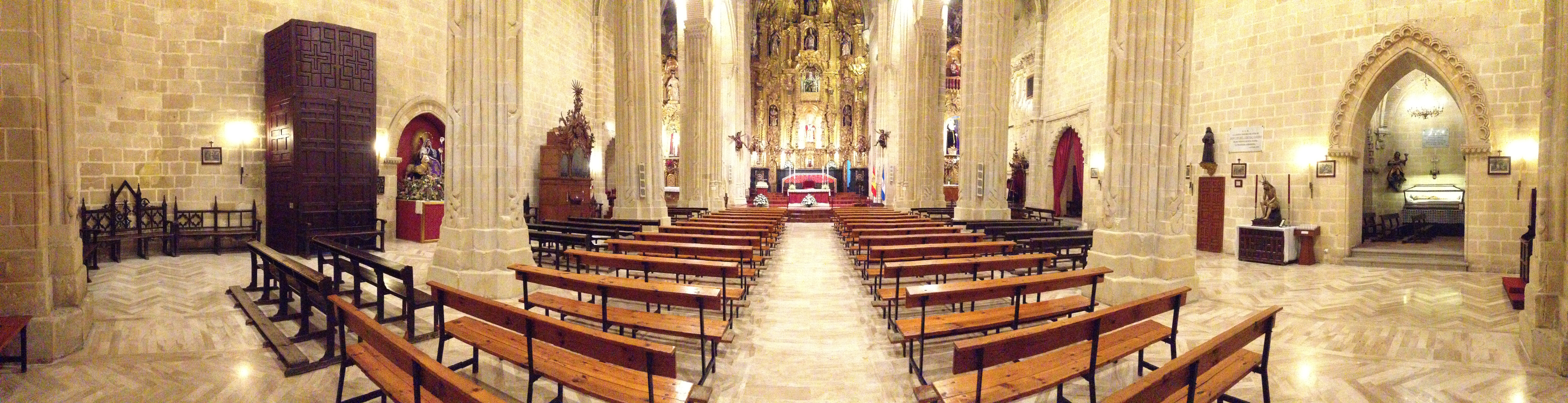

== See also ==
- List of Bien de Interés Cultural in the Province of Cádiz
