= Old City Hall of Jerez de la Frontera =

- Antiguo Ayuntamiento de Jerez de la Frontera (Spanish)
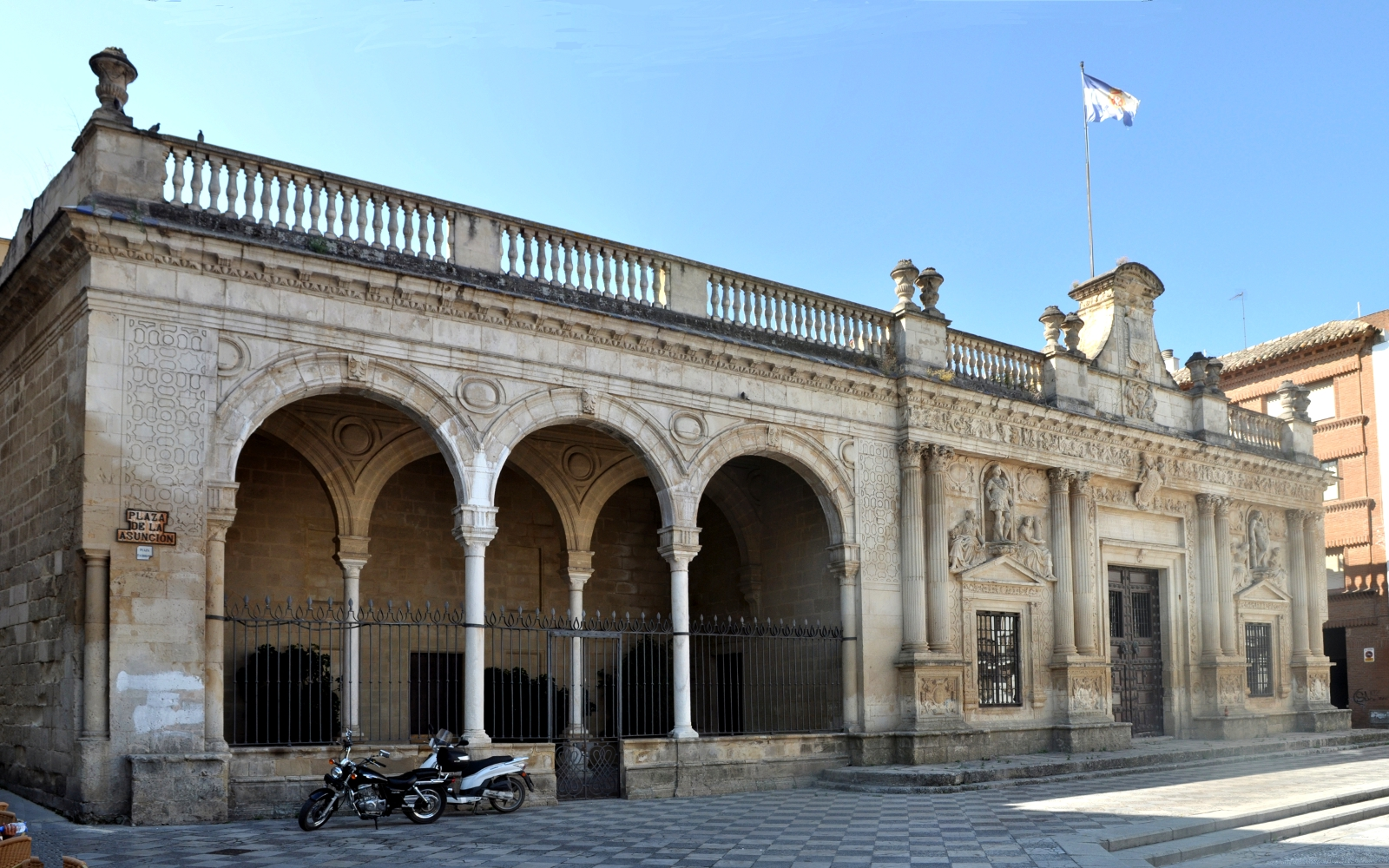

- Location within Spain
- 36.683116°N 6.138720°W
- Location: Jerez de la Frontera, Spain

Spanish Cultural Heritage
- Official name: Antiguo Ayuntamiento de Jerez de la Frontera
- Type: Non-movable
- Criteria: Monument
- Designated: 1943
- Reference no.: RI-51-0001135

The Old City Hall of Jerez de la Frontera (Spanish: Antiguo Ayuntamiento de Jerez de la Frontera) is a building located in Jerez de la Frontera, Spain. It was declared Bien de Interés Cultural in 1943.

== See also ==
- List of Bien de Interés Cultural in the Province of Cádiz
