= Iglesia de San Marcos, Jerez de la Frontera =

Church of San Marcos
- Iglesia de San Marcos (Spanish)
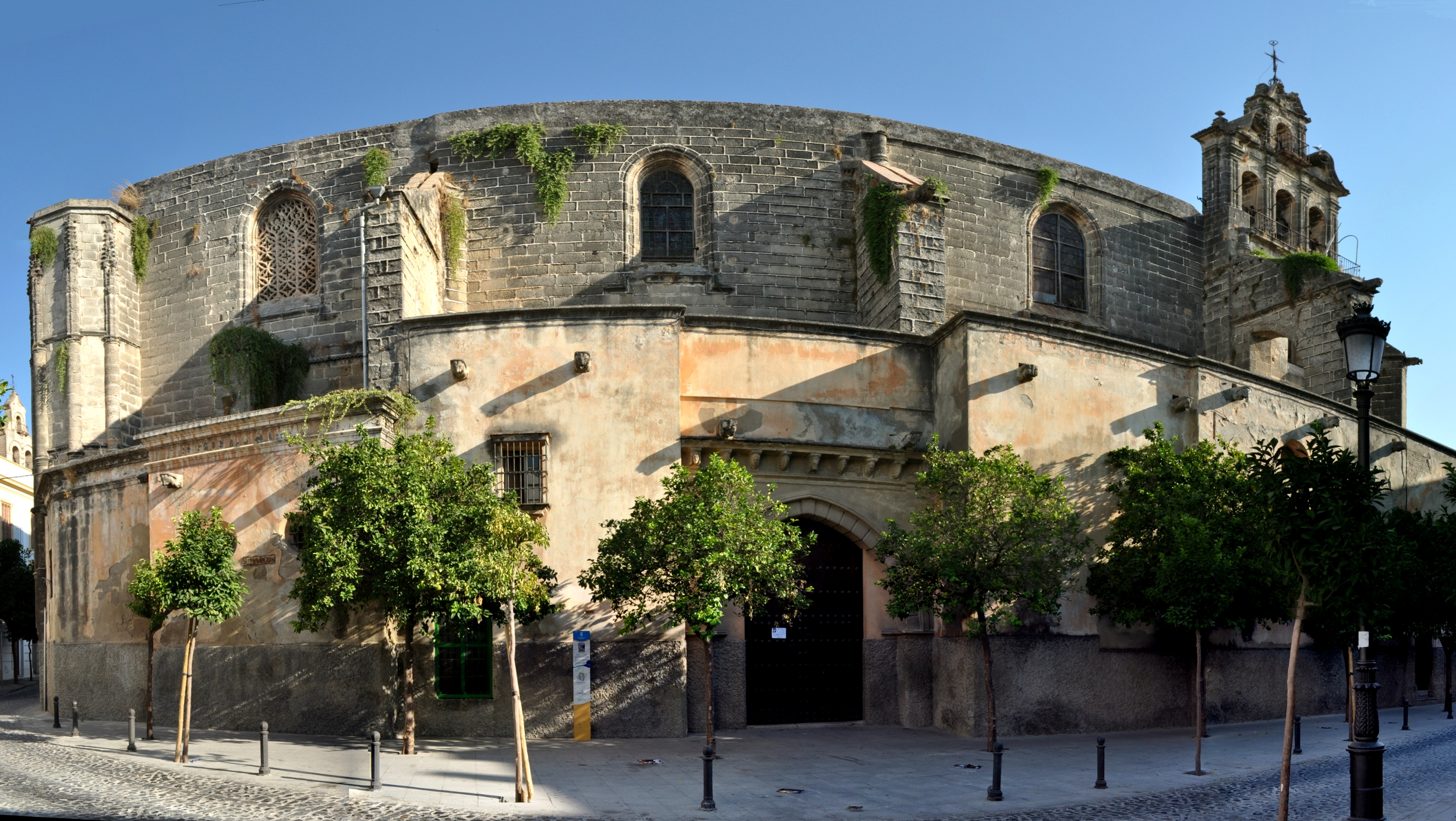

- Location within Spain
- 36.685752°N 6.139092°W
- Location: Jerez de la Frontera, Spain

Spanish Cultural Heritage
- Official name: Iglesia de San Marcos
- Type: Non-movable
- Criteria: Monument
- Designated: 1931
- Reference no.: RI-51-0000496

San Marcos is a Gothic church in Jerez de la Frontera, southern Spain. It was declared Bien de Interés Cultural in 1931.

The church originates from one of the six parishes founded by King Alfonso X of Castile after his conquest of the city in 1264. The current edifice was likely started in the mid-14th century, due to the style of its polygonal apse and the Mudéjar portal, perhaps above a pre-existing mosque. The construction is anyway not documented until the middle of the 15th century, including a substantial renovation in late Gothic style.

The church has three façades, with a main entrance portal in Mannerist style (16th century). The interior has a Baroque high altar (18th century)

== Sources ==
- Diccionario Enciclopédico Ilustrado de la Provincia de Cádiz. Caja de Ahorros de Jerez. 1985.

== See also ==
- List of Bien de Interés Cultural in the Province of Cádiz
