= Iglesia del Oratorio de San Felipe Neri =

Church of Oratorio de San Felipe Neri
- Iglesia del Oratorio de San Felipe Neri (Spanish)
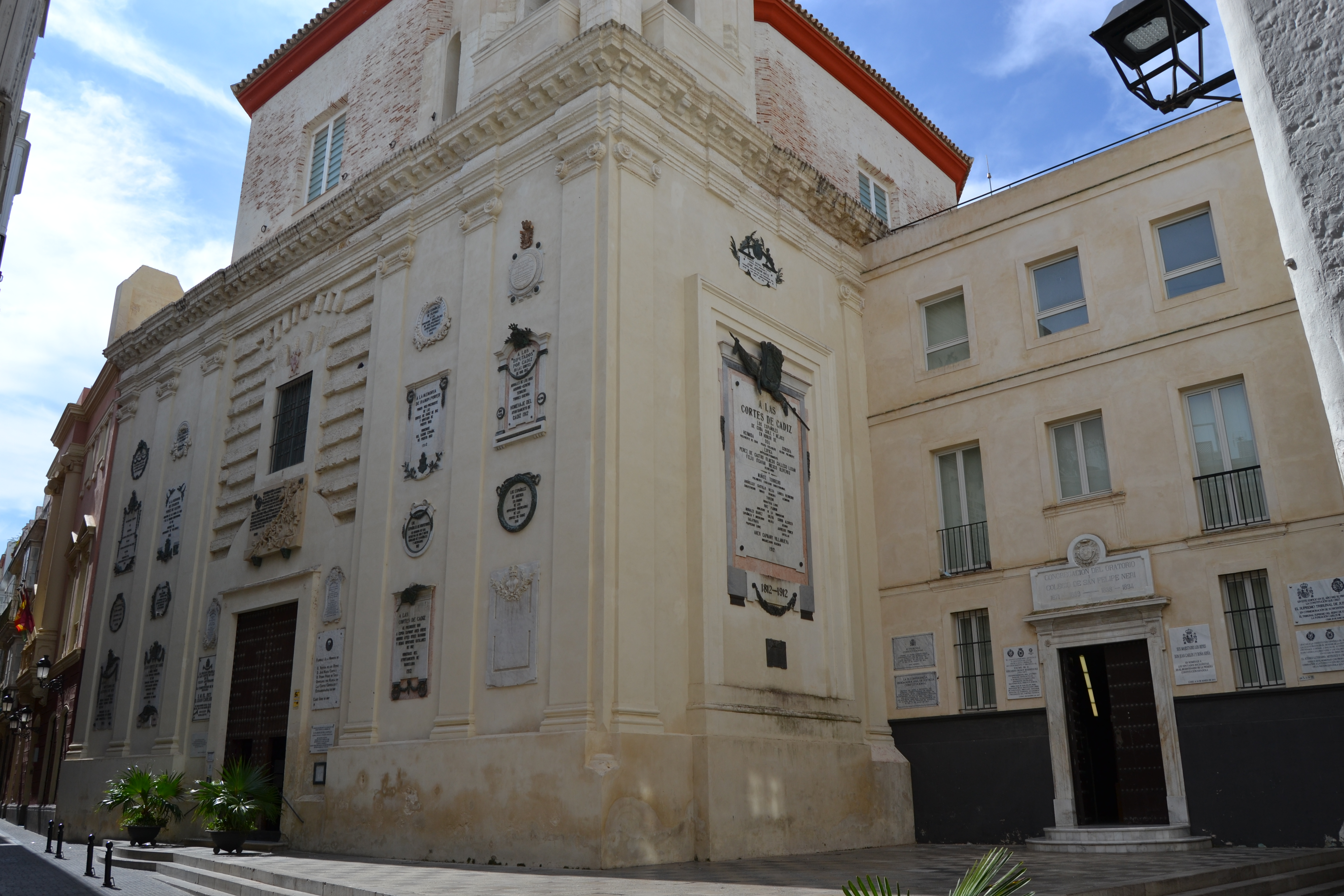

- Location within Spain
- 36.5328°N 6.2997°W
- Location: Cádiz, Spain

History
- Built: 1685-1719

Site notes
- Architectural style: Baroque

Spanish Cultural Heritage
- Official name: Iglesia del Oratorio de San Felipe Neri
- Type: Non-movable
- Criteria: Monument
- Designated: 1907
- Reference no.: RI-51-0000091

The Church of Oratorio de San Felipe Neri (Spanish: Iglesia del Oratorio de San Felipe Neri) is a church built between 1685 and 1719, located in Cádiz, Spain. It was declared Bien de Interés Cultural in 1907.

== See also ==
- List of Bien de Interés Cultural in the Province of Cádiz
- 17th-century Western domes
