= Convent of Nuestra Señora del Rosario y Santo Domingo (Cádiz) =

- Convento de Nuestra Señora del Rosario y Santo Domingo (Spanish)
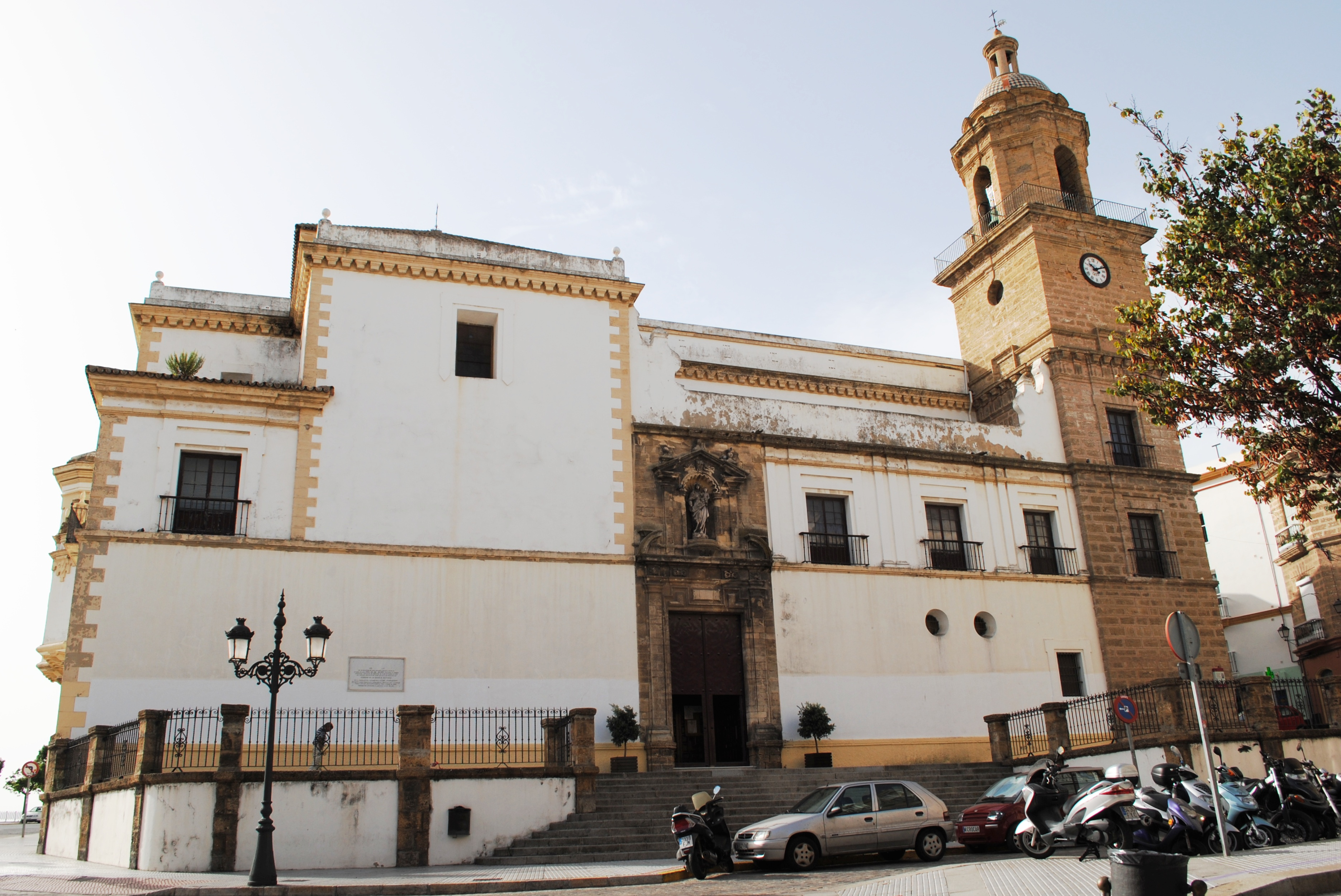

- Location within Spain
- 36.528757°N 6.290072°W
- Location: Cádiz, Spain

Spanish Cultural Heritage
- Official name: Convento de Nuestra Señora del Rosario y Santo Domingo
- Type: Non-movable
- Criteria: Monument
- Designated: 2005
- Reference no.: RI-51-0005344

The Convent of Nuestra Señora del Rosario y Santo Domingo (Spanish: Convento de Nuestra Señora del Rosario y Santo Domingo) is a convent located in Cádiz, Spain. It was declared Bien de Interés Cultural in 2005.

== See also ==
- List of Bien de Interés Cultural in the Province of Cádiz
