= Spa of Nuestra Señora de la Palma y del Real =

Spa of Our Lady of Palma and the Royal
- Balneario de Nuestra Señora de la Palma y del Real (Spanish)
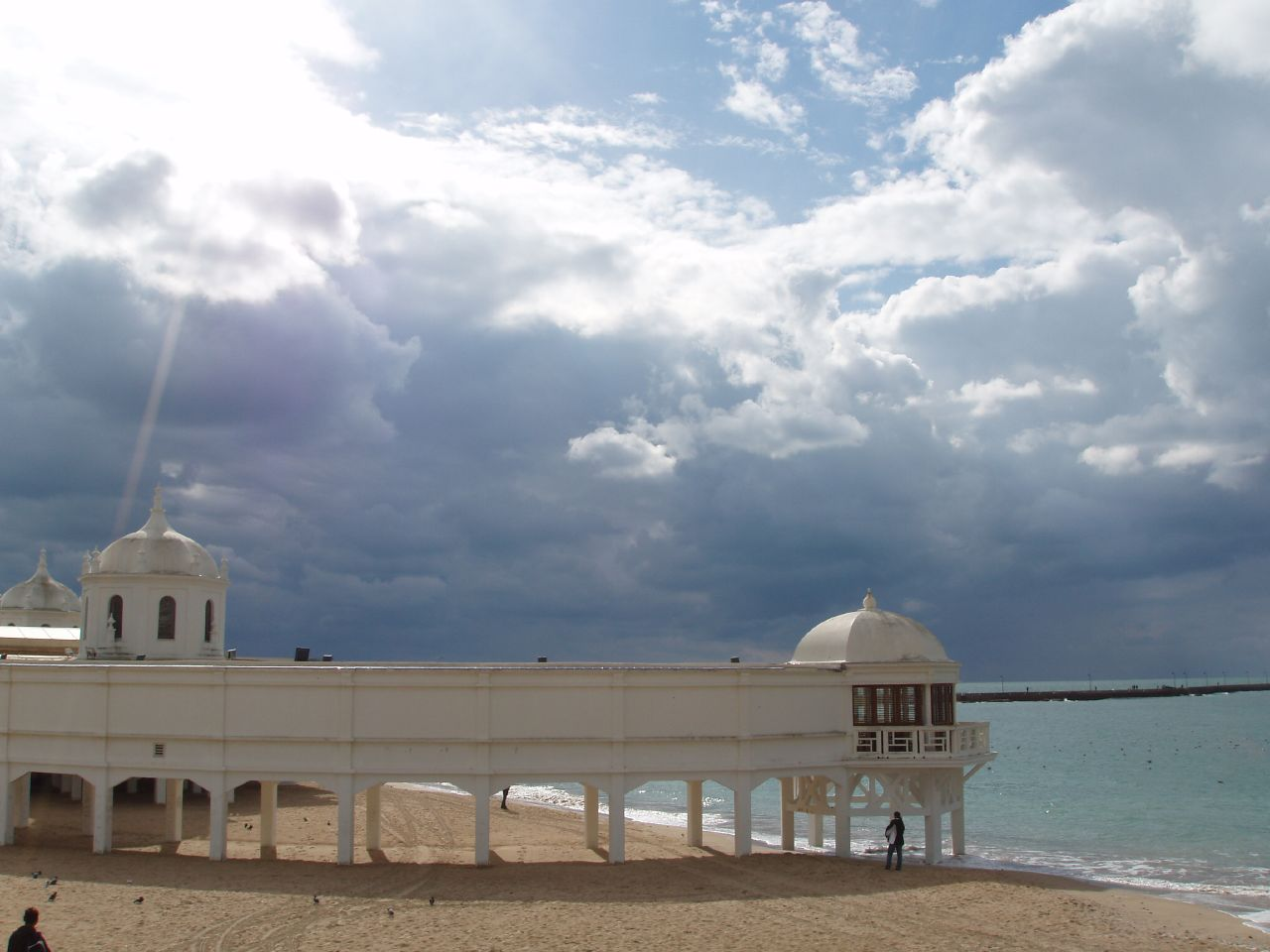

- Location within Spain
- 36.53045°N 6.305542°W
- Location: Cádiz, Spain

Spanish Cultural Heritage
- Official name: Balneario de Nuestra Señora de la Palma y del Real
- Type: Non-movable
- Criteria: Monument
- Designated: 1990
- Reference no.: RI-51-0005281

The Spa of Our Lady of Palma and the Royal (Spanish: Balneario de Nuestra Señora de la Palma y del Real) is a spa located in Cádiz, Spain. It was declared Bien de Interés Cultural in 1990.

== See also ==
- List of Bien de Interés Cultural in the Province of Cádiz
