= Church of Santiago (Jerez de la Frontera) =

- Iglesia de Santiago (Spanish)
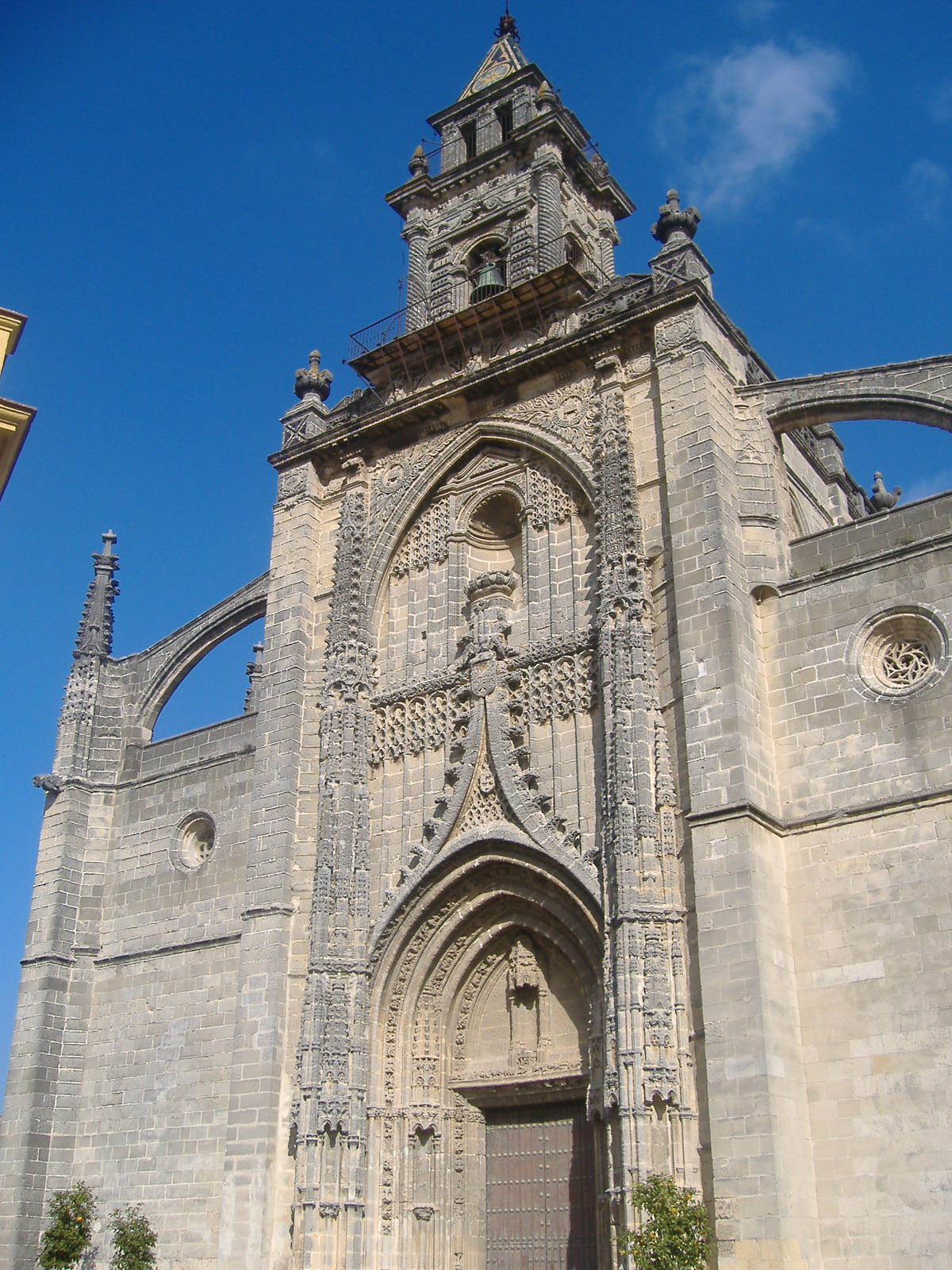

- Location within Spain
- 36.687859°N 6.143784°W
- Location: Jerez de la Frontera, Spain

Spanish Cultural Heritage
- Official name: Iglesia de Santiago
- Type: Non-movable
- Criteria: Monument
- Designated: 1931
- Reference no.: RI-51-0000495

The Church of Santiago (Spanish: Iglesia de Santiago) is a church located in Jerez de la Frontera, Spain. It was declared Bien de Interés Cultural in 1931.

== Location ==
Near Santiago square, the church is built outside the enclosure walled of the medieval city. In the place where there was a chapel with the same name built in times of the Spanish reconquest.

== Host ==
The church is hosts two associations (Hermandades):

- Hermandad del Prendimiento
- Hermandad del Rosario de Capataces y Costaleros.

== See also ==
- List of Bien de Interés Cultural in the Province of Cádiz
