= Arco del Pópulo =

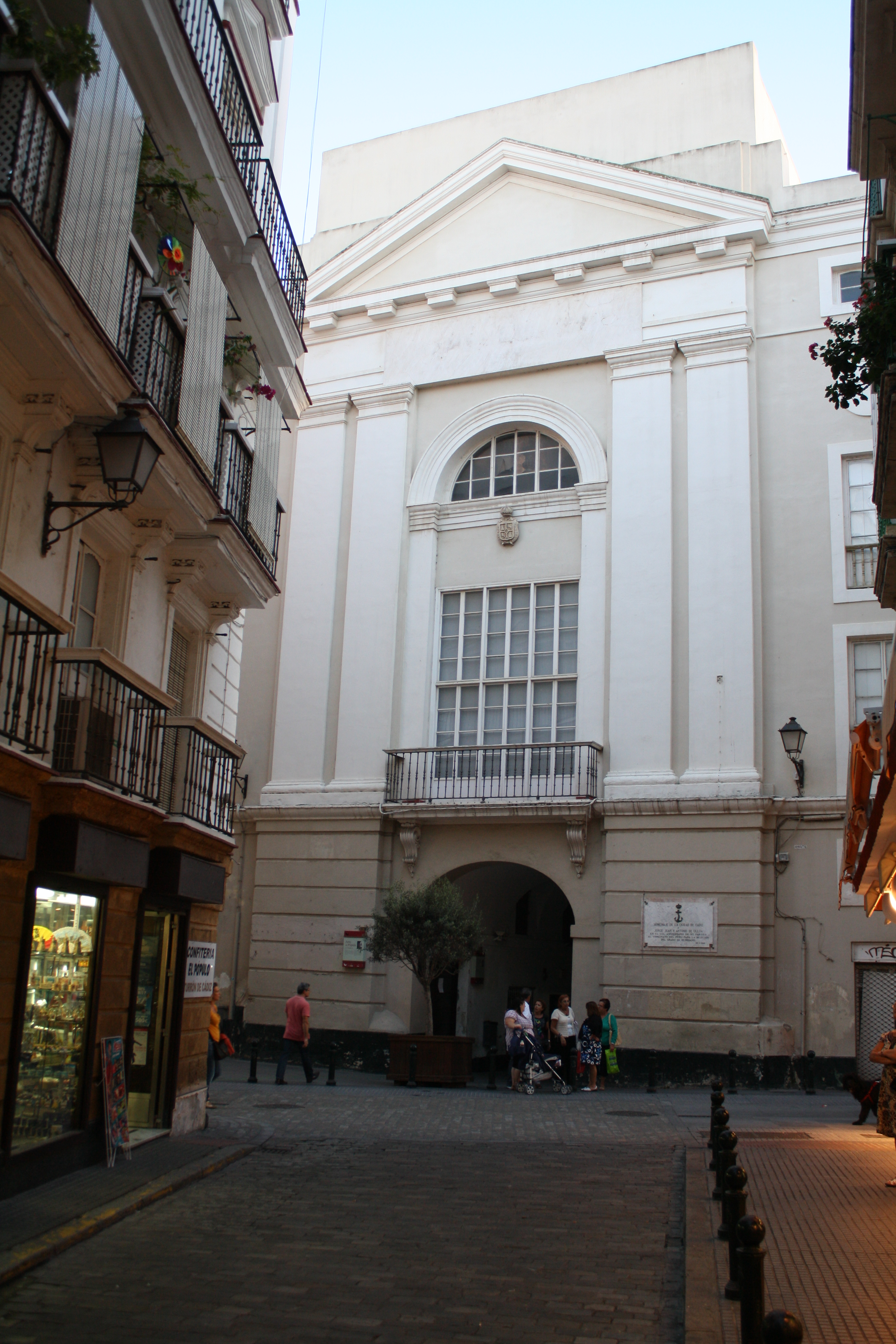

- Location within Province of Cádiz Location within Spain
- 36°31′45″N 6°17′40″W
- Location: Cádiz, Spain

Spanish Cultural Heritage
- Type: Non-movable
- Criteria: Monument

Arco del Pópulo is an archway of the city of Cádiz, southern Spain. It has been declared a Bien de Interés Cultural site.

The Arco del Pópulo in the city of Cádiz ( Spain ) is the primitive Puerta del Mar, because it accessed the port area, and was flanked by two cubes. At the beginning of the 17th century, the chapel of Nuestra Señora del Pópulo was built before it, which has given it the appearance of a passageway that it presents today. The characteristics of the interior wall match the building techniques of the Islamic walls of the tenth and eleventh centuries, while the arched, arched, it is very possible that originally was horseshoe. The arrangement of its voussoirs makes it possible to situate it in the 12th century, in the Almohad period, like the entire original perimeter wall.

== History ==
Door of the Sea was denominated Primitively and also Main door of the Villa. The waters of the bay, in fact, came very close to them, because what is now the Plaza de San Juan de Dios and was Plaza Real, was almost occupied by the Bay-Caleta Canal and that was the real pier and port commercial of Cádiz . The channel, when going blind, became small lagoons or gaps (whose name was given to the current street Plocia ), the second of which was blinded to 1628 while the other did it towards 1618, remaining as a kind of shipyard for small ships and ships.

The bay side entrance had a ravelin and was flanked by two large crenelated cubes, using castrametation of the time, and on the right was placed the clock that the Cabildo had built a watchmaker of Osuna.

From 1587, its towers had an image of Our Lady that had the Latin invocation of "Ave María, ora por Pópulo", which popularly came to be known simply as "El Pópulo". This image was desecrated by the Anglo-Dutch invaders who invaded the city of Cádiz back in 1596, commanded by the Earl of Essex.

In 1598, with the thought of avoiding new and possible profanations, a chapel was begun between the two towers and over the vault of the arch cannon.

Through the door they made their entrance the Bishops, accompanied by the secular Cabildo that made delivery of the person of the Prelate to the ecclesiastic, just passed this one, and in front of the houses that were of the Núñez de Villavicencio.

When both city councilors had to attend in concurrence to celebrations, like those of San Sebastián, or to the functions in the church of the company, the point of meeting was the exit of the Arch of the Pópulo, in the street of the game of the ball.

With respect to the primitive image that dominated the door, in the writing of donation to the corregidor Añasco (Cabildo of 1599 ) it is said that it was Our Lady of Antigua, today of the Pópulo. Years later, in 1735, the chaplain of Guardias Marinas y del Pópulo, Don Diego Rodríguez Hidalgo, asked the City Council that the new Puerta del Mar, which was located in front of the dock, and was demolished in 1902, be placed as it once was, an image of the Virgin of the Antigua, that since the 10th century was worshiped in Ortuña and that so much faith and devotion awakened in the men of the sea .... This Virgin of the Antigua would be the origin of a Brotherhood, whose meetings would give origin to the Santa Cueva .

== See also ==
- List of Bien de Interés Cultural in the Province of Cádiz
