= Monasterio de la Victoria, Province of Cadiz =

Monasterio de la Victoria
- Iglesia de la Prisión Central (Spanish)
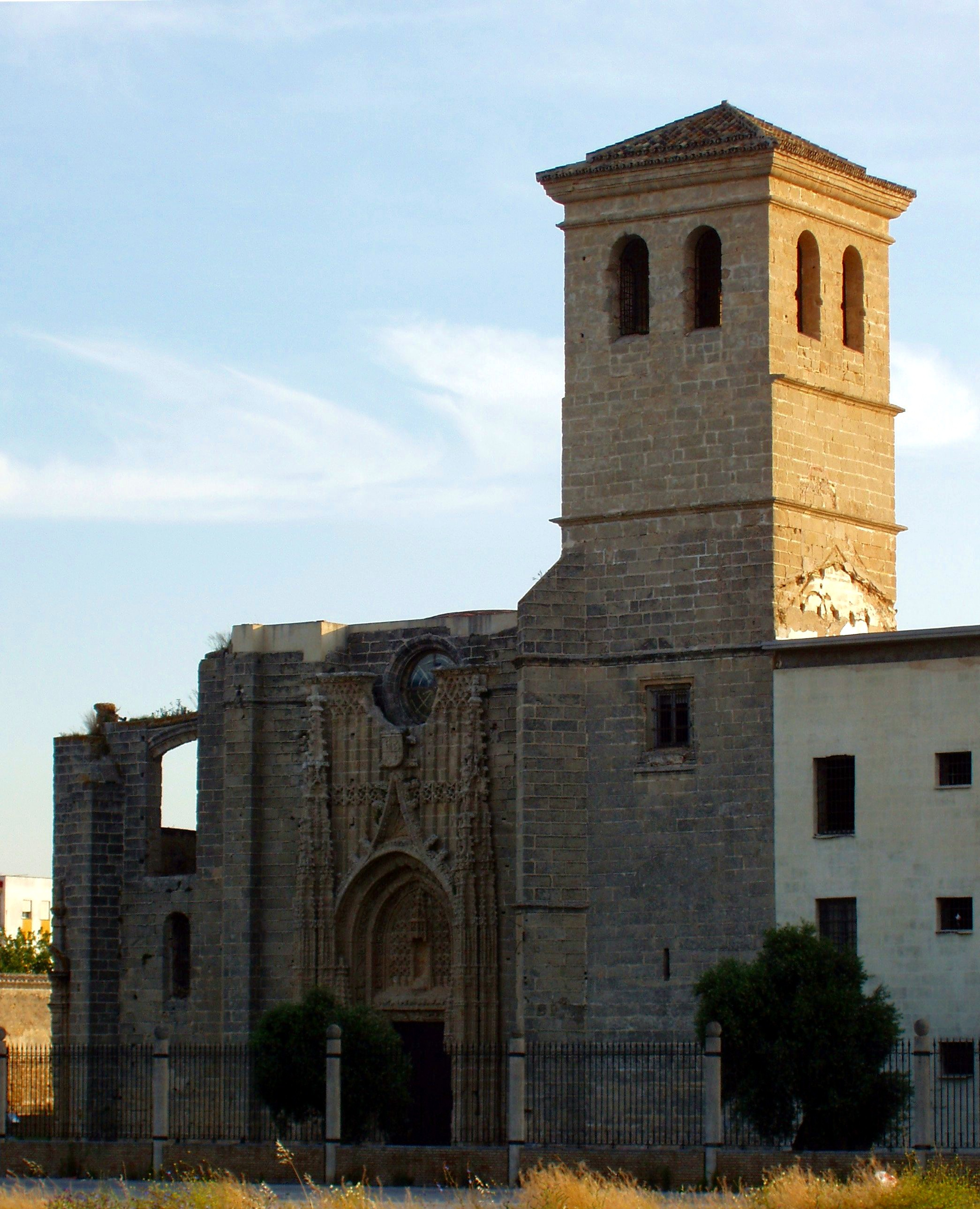

- Location within Spain
- 36°36′20.38″N 6°13′2.88″W
- Location: El Puerto de Santa María, Cádiz, Spain

Spanish Cultural Heritage
- Official name: Iglesia de la Prisión Central, Iglesia del Monasterio de la Victoria
- Type: Non-movable
- Criteria: Monument
- Designated: 1978-12-29
- Reference no.: (R.I.) - 51 - 0004322 - 00000

Monasterio de la Victoria is a former monastery located in El Puerto de Santa María, province of Cádiz, southern Spain. It was built in the 16th century by Dukes of Medinaceli. The buildings housed a prison between 1886 and 1981.

During the Second Spanish Republic, the Civil War and Franco's Dictatorship, the Monastery was used as a prison. During and after the civil war, it housed political prisoners such as Ramón Rubial, then president of the Socialist Party and Eleuterio Sánchez.

The building is open to visitors on Fridays, and includes an exhibition about the building's history. Today the building hosts cultural and official events.

== See also ==
- List of Bienes de Interés Cultural in Cádiz
