= Church of San Miguel (Jerez de la Frontera) =

Cultural property in Jerez de la Frontera, Spain

Church of Saint Michael
- Iglesia de San Miguel (Spanish)
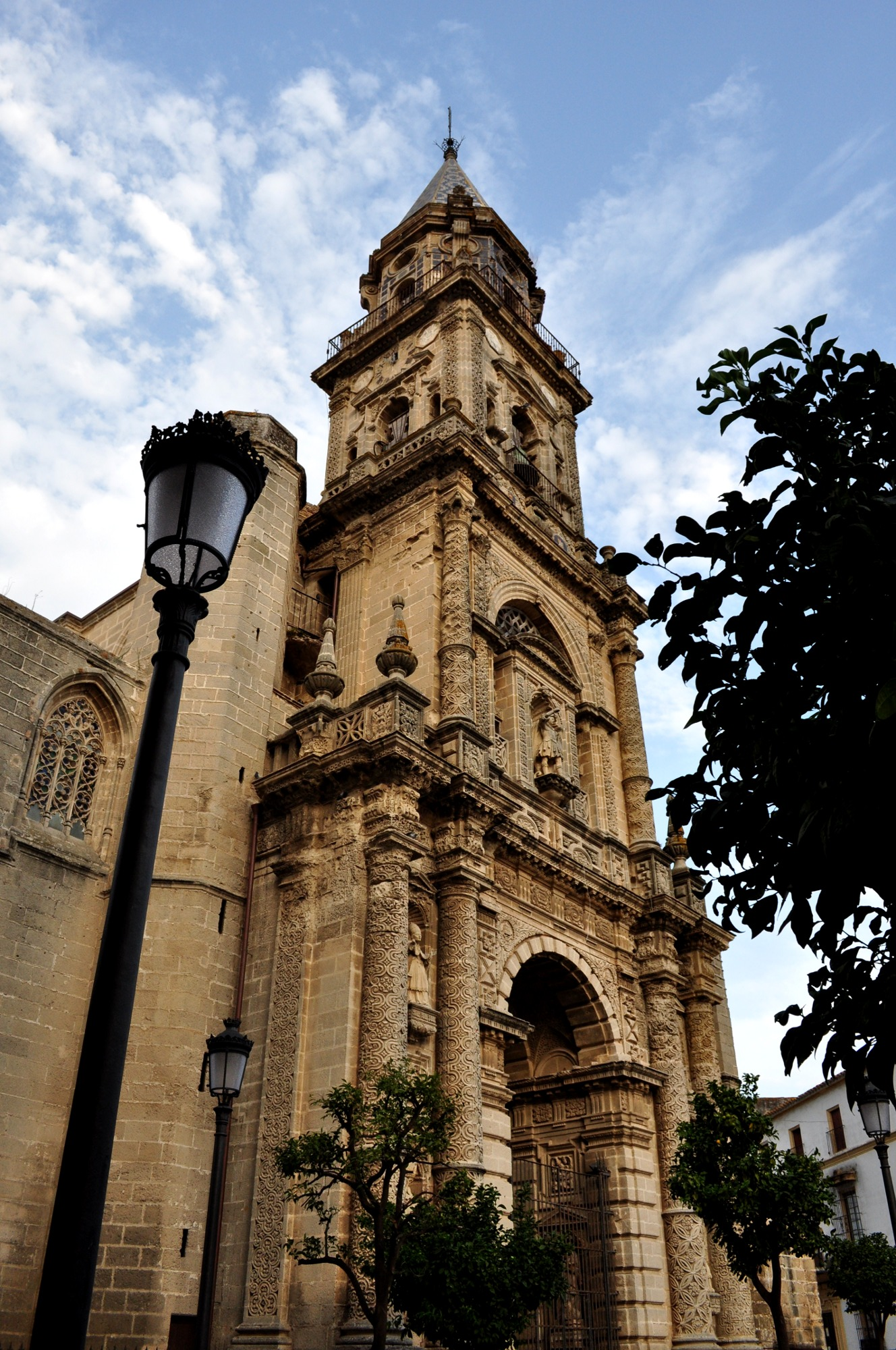

- Location within Spain
- 36.679825°N 6.137432°W
- Location: Jerez de la Frontera, Spain

Spanish Cultural Heritage
- Official name: Iglesia de San Miguel
- Type: Non-movable
- Criteria: Monument
- Designated: 1931
- Reference no.: RI-51-0000497

The Church of Saint Michael (Spanish: Iglesia de San Miguel) is a church in Jerez de la Frontera, Spain. It was declared Bien de Interés Cultural in 1931.

== History ==
The Church of Saint Michael started its life in the end of the 15th century. A plaque at the door of its Gothic facade is dated 1484. It is believed that the church was commissioned by the Catholic Monarchs when they visited the city in 1484. Previously, the area was served by an old hermitage. Its construction, however, would last several centuries resulting in an excellent cathedral-like set where latest gothic elements and other ones typical from beginning and full renaissance and baroque.

== Description ==
The church has a rectangular floor divided into three naves. The central nave has a higher ceiling and between each nave are pilasters crafted in a flowery gothic style. It is considered one of the best temples in the city of Jerez.

== See also ==
- List of Bien de Interés Cultural in the Province of Cádiz
- 16th-century Western domes
