= House of Vizarrón =

House in El Puerto de Santa María, Spain

- La Casa Vizarrón o de las Cadenas (Spanish)
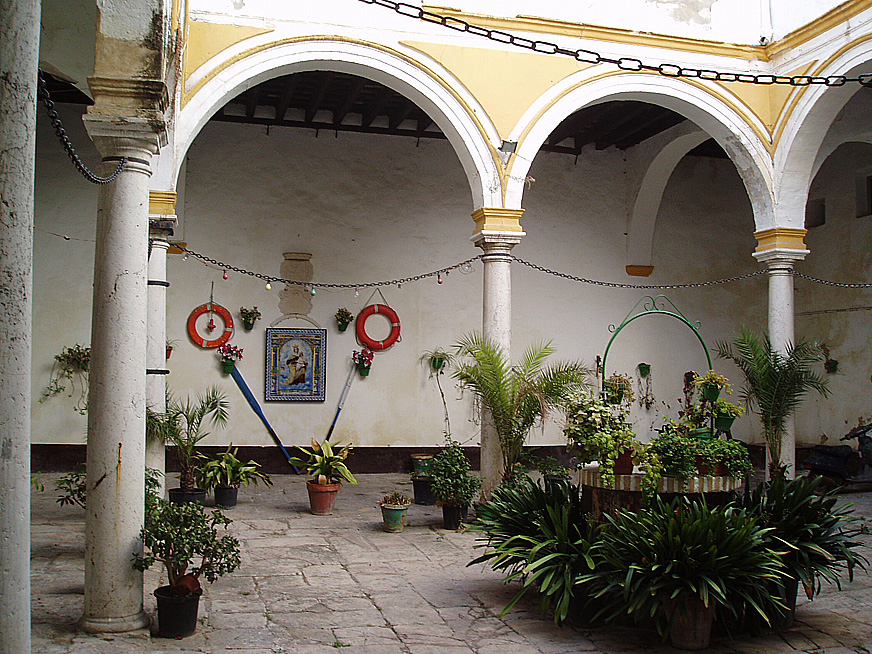

- Location within Province of Cádiz Location within Spain
- 36.594917°N 6.226906°W
- Location: El Puerto de Santa María, Spain

Spanish Cultural Heritage
- Official name: La Casa Vizarrón o de las Cadenas
- Type: Non-movable
- Criteria: Monument
- Designated: 2006
- Reference no.: RI-51-0011421

The House of Vizarrón (Spanish: La Casa Vizarrón o de las Cadenas) is a house located in El Puerto de Santa María, Spain. It was declared Bien de Interés Cultural in 2006.

== See also ==
- List of Bien de Interés Cultural in the Province of Cádiz
