= Casa consistorial de San Fernando =

Government building in Andalusia, Spain

Coordinates: 36°27′53″N 6°11′55″W

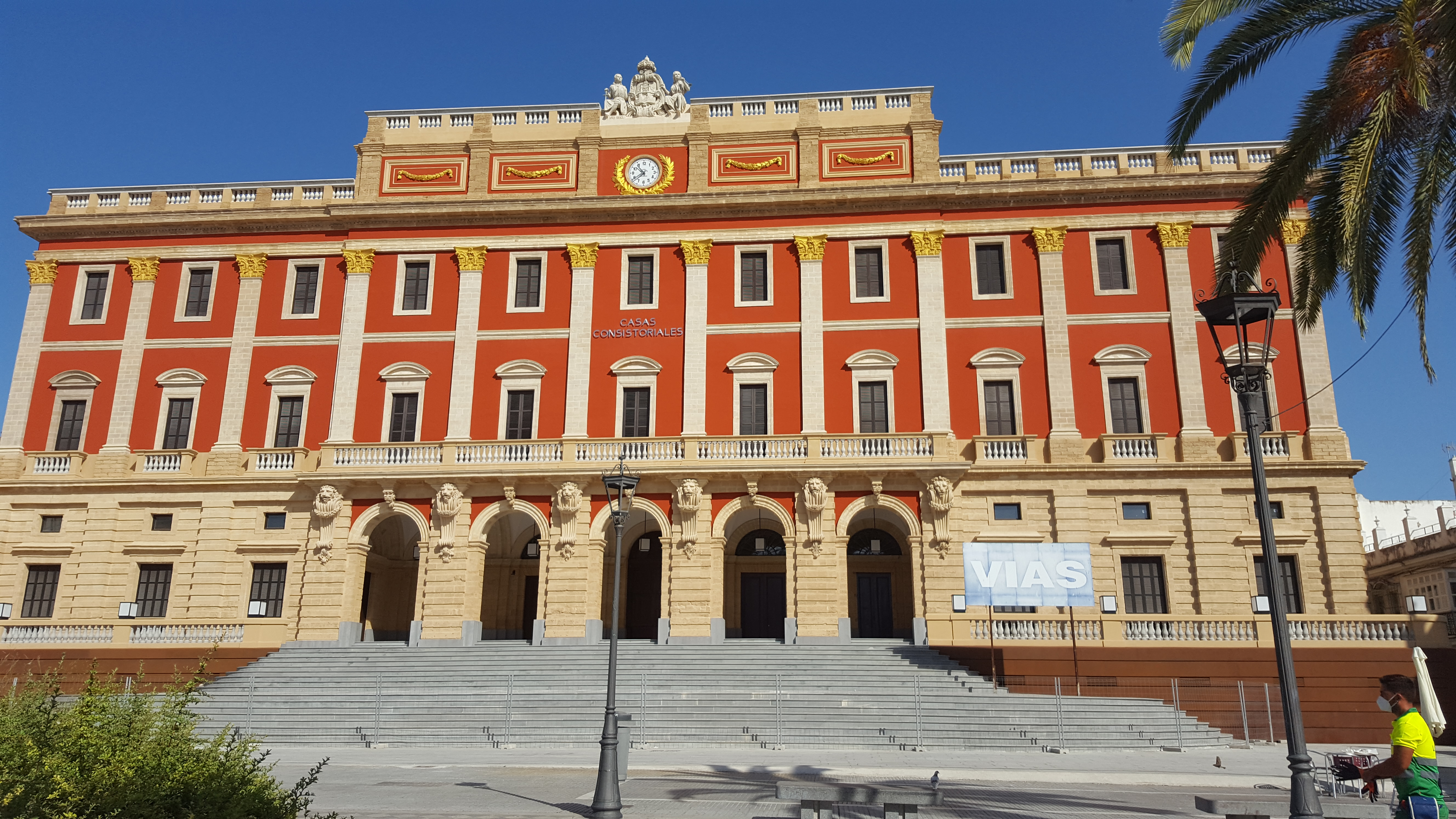
Casa consistorial de San Fernando

Casa consistorial de San Fernando is a building that houses the administrative offices of the city government of San Fernando in the Province of Cádiz, Andalusia, Spain. This building is of neoclassic style, located in the Plaza de España (colloquially Plaza del Rey) and is considered the largest town hall in Andalusia and the third largest in Spain. Construction work began in the mid- eighteenth century under Torcuato Cayon, lasting until the nineteenth century, directed by various architects.

== See also ==
- List of Bien de Interés Cultural in the Province of Cádiz
