= Arco de los Blanco =

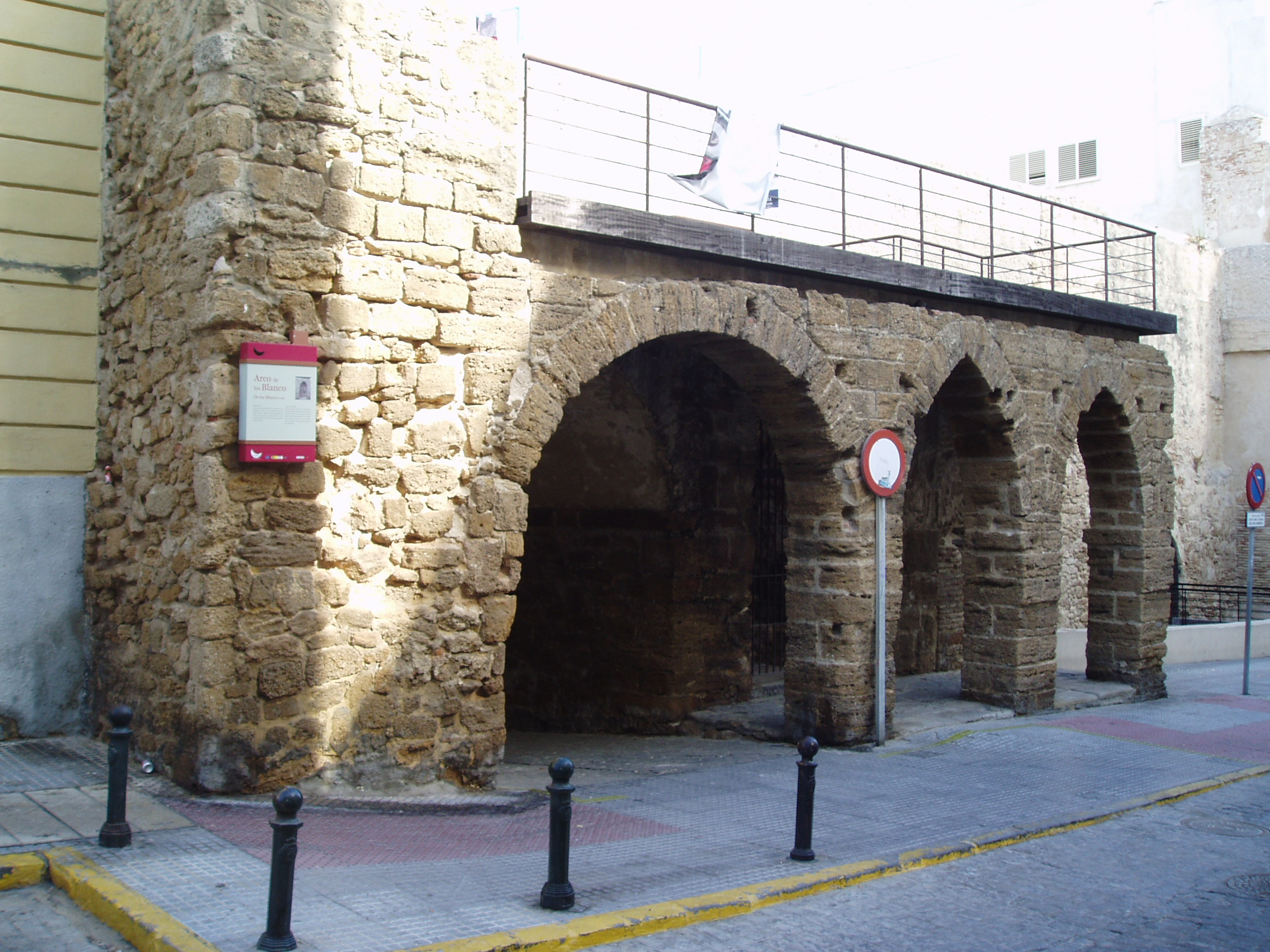

- Location within Province of Cádiz Location within Spain
- 36°31′42″N 6°17′35″W
- Location: Cádiz, Spain

Spanish Cultural Heritage
- Type: Non-movable
- Criteria: Monument

Arco de los Blanco is an archway of the Castillo de la Villa in Cádiz, southern Spain. It has been declared a Bien de Interés Cultural site.

== See also ==
- List of Bien de Interés Cultural in the Province of Cádiz
