= Castillo de Olvera =

Coordinates: 36.9357°N 5.2676°W

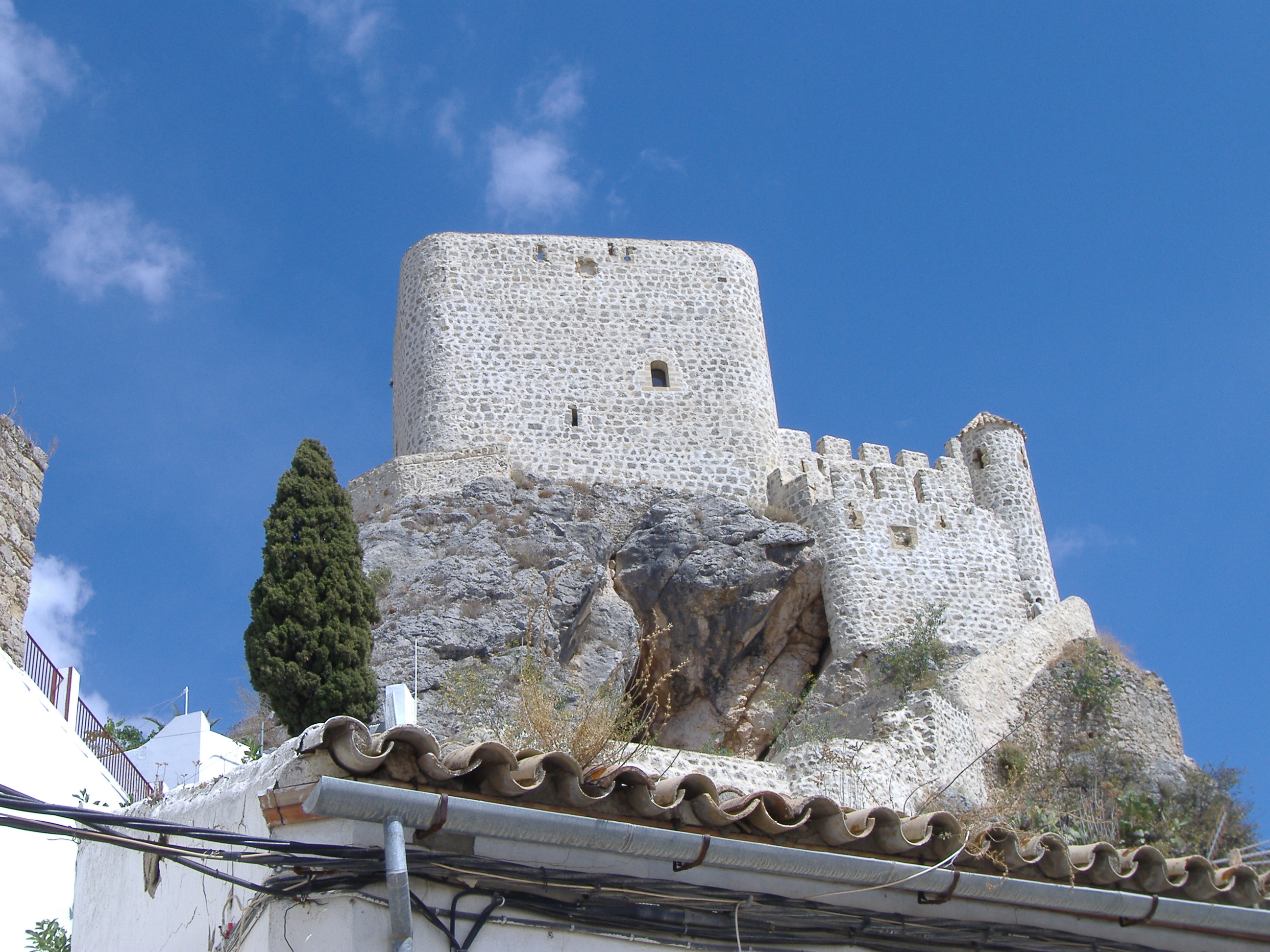
Castillo de Olvera

Castillo de Olvera is located in Olvera in the province of Cádiz, southern Spain. It was built in the late 12th century as part of the defensive system of the Emirate of Granada. Situated on a rock 623 metres (2,044 ft) above sea level, the highest point of the town, the castle has an irregularly-shaped elongated triangle that fits the form of the rock base. It was declared a Bien de Interés Cultural monument in 1982.
