= Walls of Vejer de la Frontera =

- Murallas de Vejer de la Frontera (Spanish)
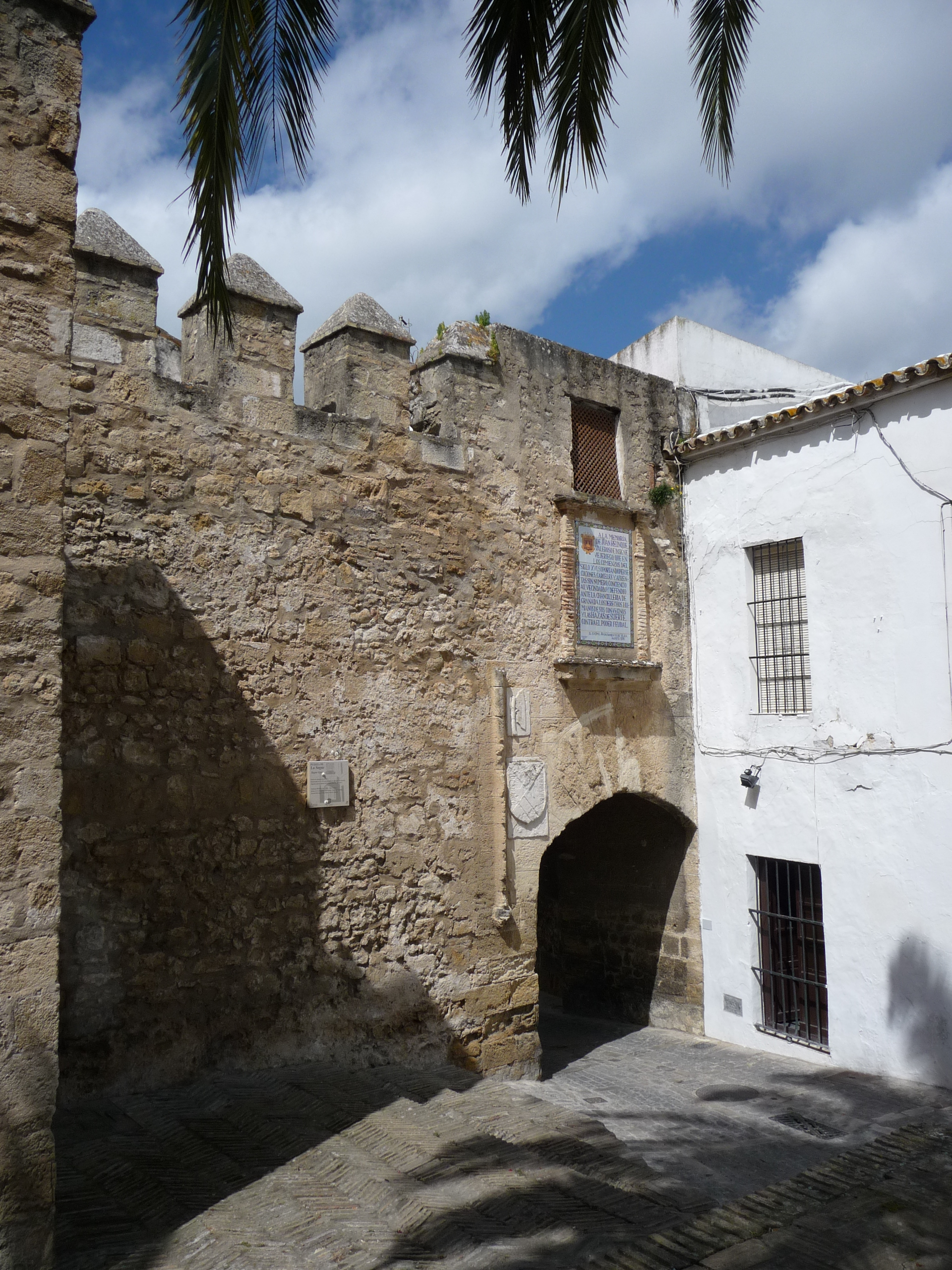

- Location within Spain
- 36.253523°N 5.962707°W
- Location: Vejer de la Frontera, Spain

Spanish Cultural Heritage
- Official name: Murallas de Vejer de la Frontera
- Type: Non-movable
- Criteria: Monument
- Designated: 1993
- Reference no.: RI-51-0007645

The Walls of Vejer de la Frontera (Spanish: Murallas de Vejer de la Frontera) refers to the town walls of Vejer de la Frontera, Spain. The walled enclosure stands on the upper part of a hill whose ravines, with the Barbate River below acting as a moat, provide much of its defence. It originally had four gates, three of which survive, and its walls, about 2 metres (7 ft) thick, are built of stone and rubble masonry bound with lime-and-sand mortar. The walls were declared Bien de Interés Cultural in 1993.
