= Castillo de Gigonza =

Castle in the province of Cádiz, Spain

Coordinates: 36.552222°N 5.833611°W

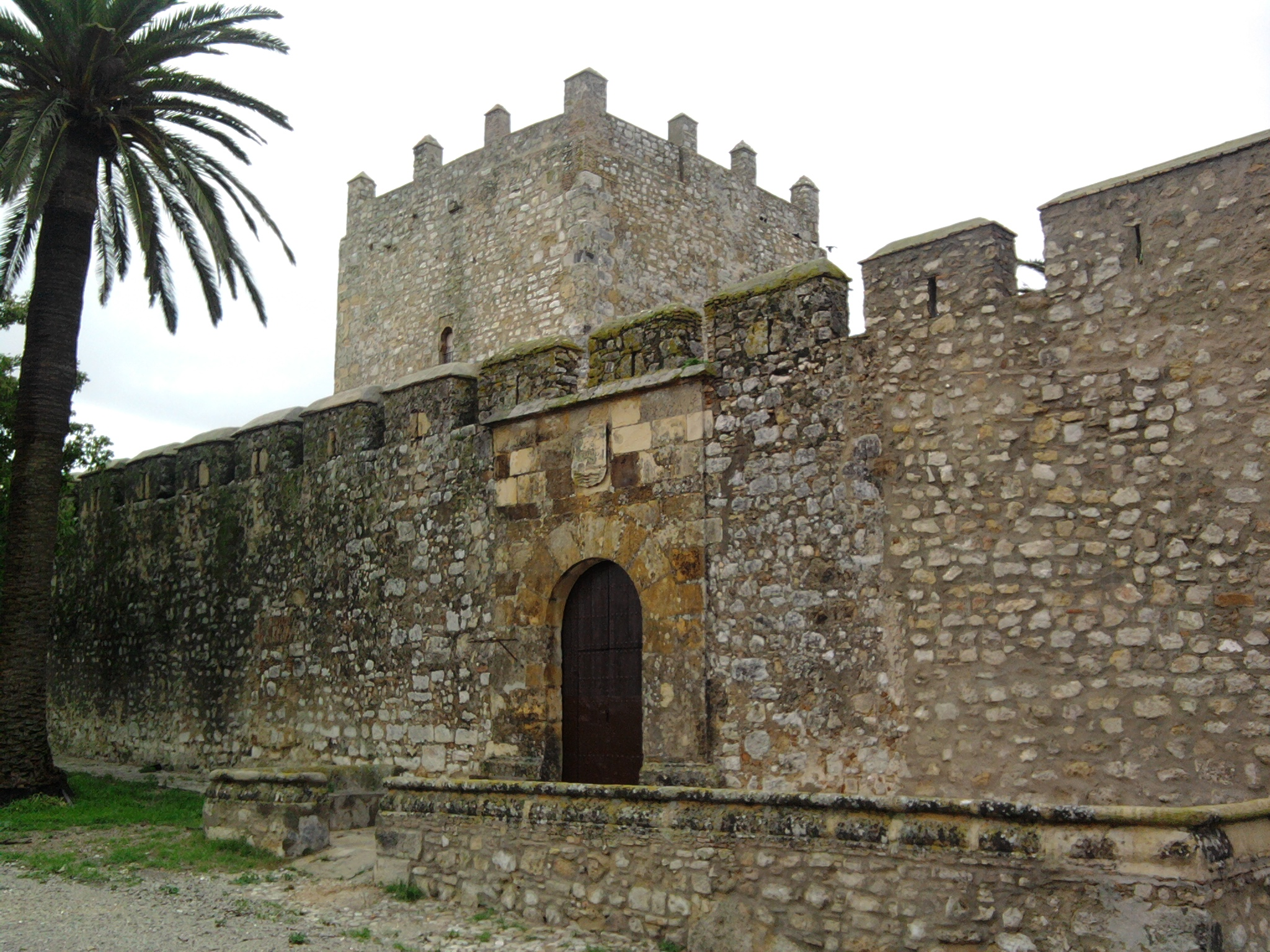
Castle of Gigonza

Castillo de Gigonza is a castle located in San José del Valle in the province of Cádiz, southern Spain. It is situated on the road from Medina Sidonia to Arcos de la Frontera, 12 kilometres (7.5 mi) from Paterna de Rivera. It was declared a Bien de Interés Cultural monument in 1993. In 2009, it was reported that the Socialist Party of San José del Valle denounced restoration work being done at Castillo de Gigonza on the castle tower, the chapel, and the adjoining houses and courtyards, stating the work was illegal and unlicensed.

The fortified site has been in existence since antiquity. The present castle is of Andalusian origin and almost square in shape, with two parts to its structure. A narrow and low door contains a lintel with two heavy imposts. The upper floor is vaulted and contains windows. The grounds contain a surrounding fence. The courtyard is accessed through a door with an arch, displaying the coat of arms of the Casa de Arcos.
