= Tower of San Dionisio =

Tower in Jerez de la Frontera, Spain

- Torre de San Dionisio (Spanish)
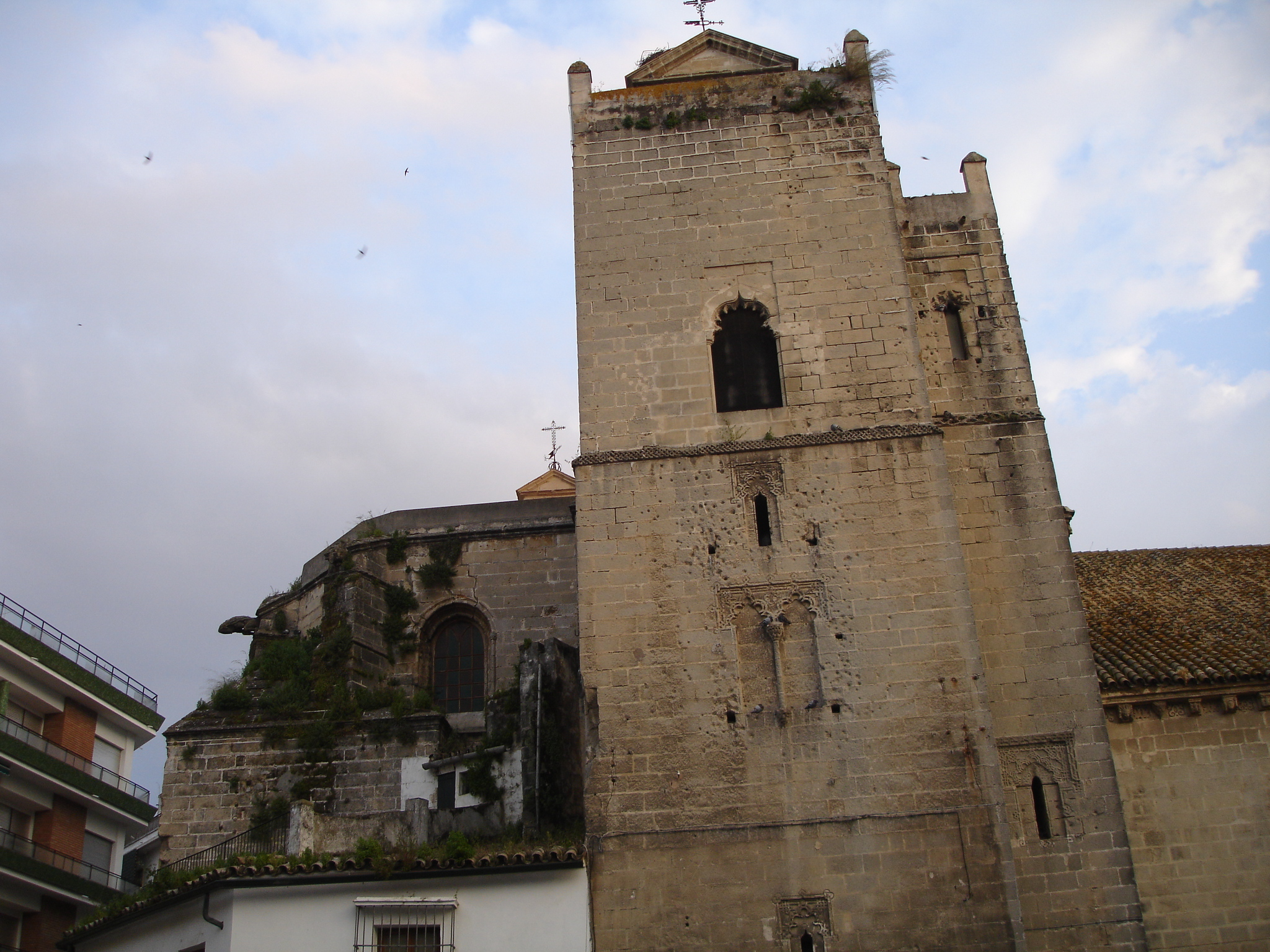

- Location within Spain
- 36.683601°N 6.138427°W
- Location: Jerez de la Frontera, Spain

Spanish Cultural Heritage
- Official name: Torre de San Dionisio
- Type: Non-movable
- Criteria: Monument
- Designated: 1978
- Reference no.: RI-51-0004318

The Tower of San Dionisio (Spanish: Torre de San Dionisio) or Tower of Atalaya is a tower located in Jerez de la Frontera, Spain whose construction began in the 15th century. It was declared Bien de Interés Cultural in 1979.
