= Tower of Tajo =

- Torre del Tajo (Spanish)
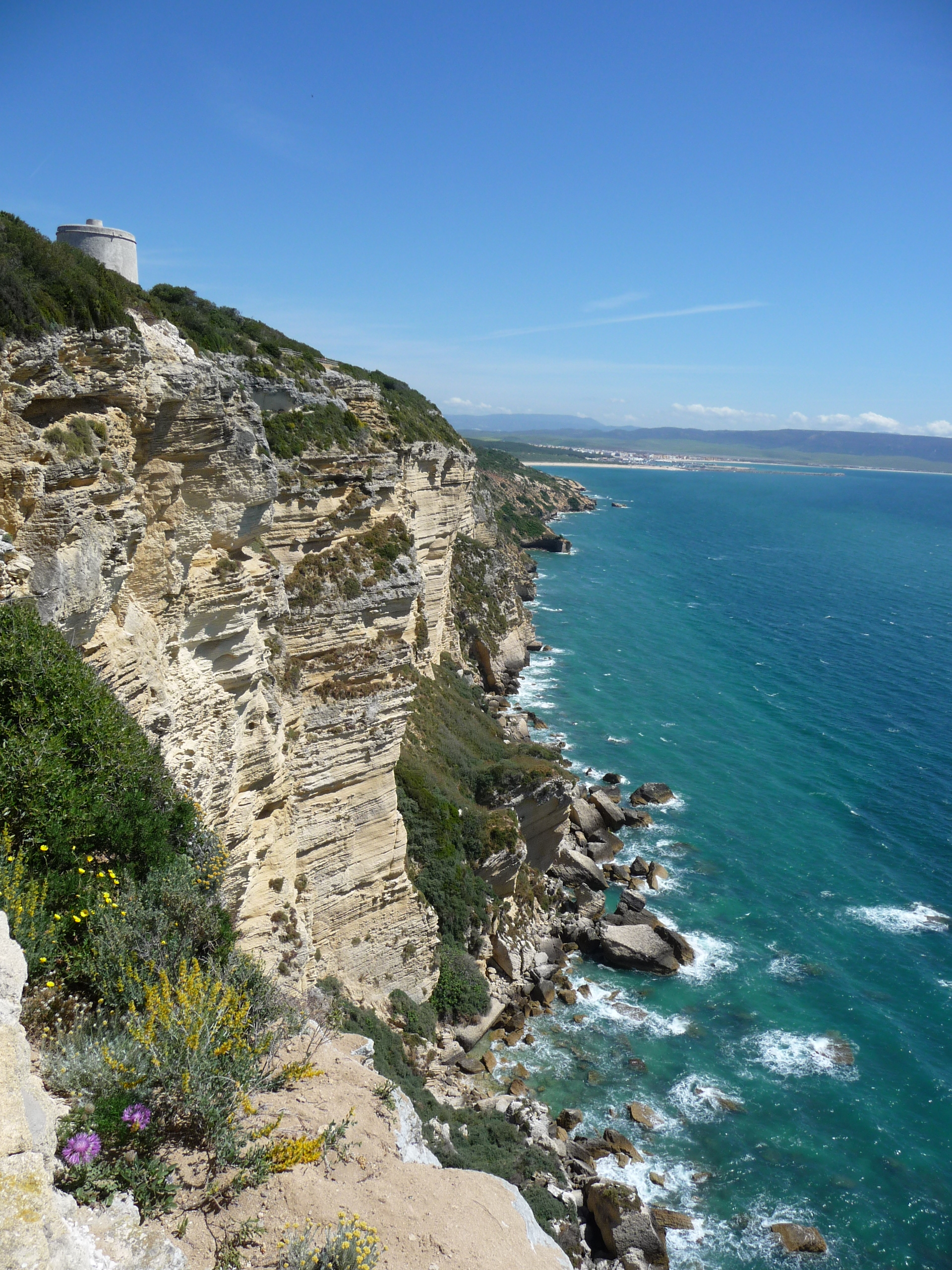

- Location within Spain
- 36.179165°N 5.972655°W
- Location: Barbate, Spain

Spanish Cultural Heritage
- Official name: Torre del Tajo
- Type: Non-movable
- Criteria: Monument
- Designated: 1985
- Reference no.: RI-51-0011399

The Tower of Tajo (Spanish: Torre del Tajo) is a tower located in Barbate, Spain. It was declared Bien de Interés Cultural in 1985.
