= Castle of Trebujena =

- Castillo de Trebujena (Spanish)
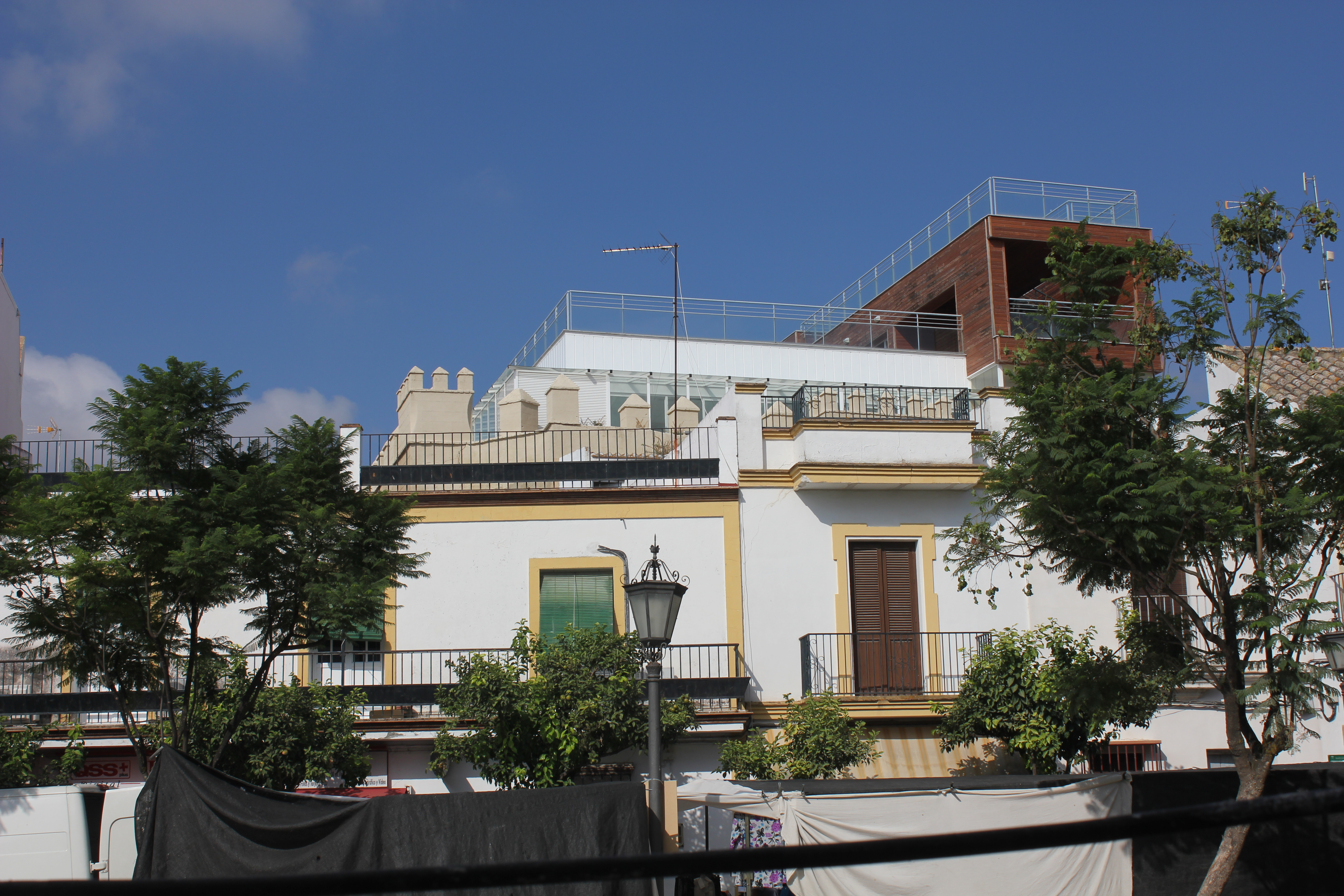

- Location within Spain
- 36.870284°N 6.176652°W
- Location: Trebujena, Spain

Spanish Cultural Heritage
- Official name: Castillo de Trebujena
- Type: Non-movable
- Criteria: Monument
- Designated: 1993
- Reference no.: RI-51-0008795

The Castle of Trebujena (Spanish: Castillo de Trebujena) is a castle located in Trebujena, Spain. It was declared Bien de Interés Cultural in 1993.
