= Castle of Alcalá de los Gazules =

- Castillo de Alcalá de los Gazules (Spanish)
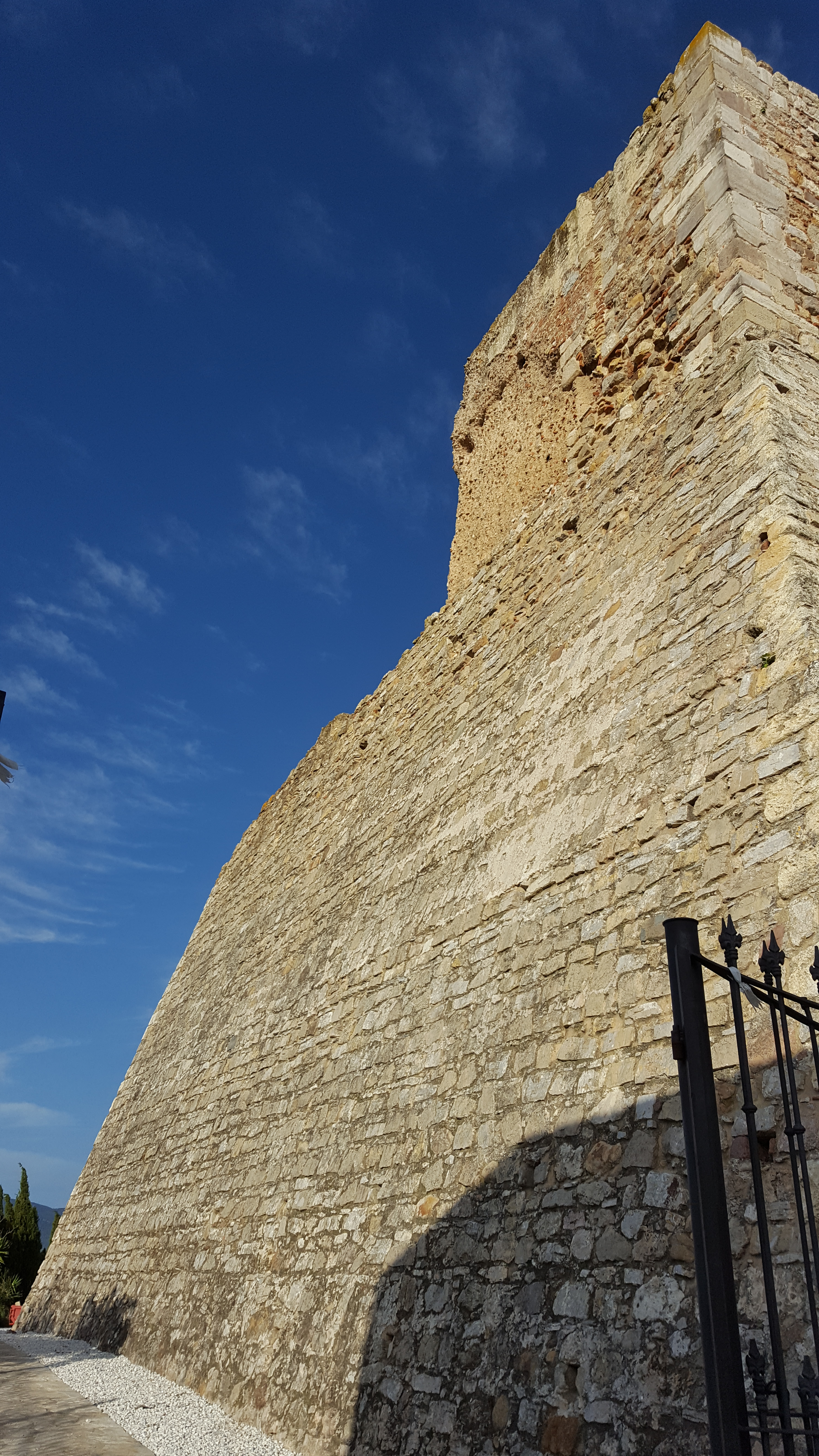

- Location within Spain
- 36.463595°N 5.723262°W
- Location: Alcalá de los Gazules, Spain

Spanish Cultural Heritage
- Official name: Castillo de Alcalá de los Gazules
- Type: Non-movable
- Criteria: Monument
- Designated: 1993
- Reference no.: RI-51-0007541

The Castle of Alcalá de los Gazules (Spanish: Castillo) is a castle located in Alcalá de los Gazules, Spain. It was declared Bien de Interés Cultural in 1993.
