= Torre Alta =

Coordinates: 36°27′49″N 6°12′21″W

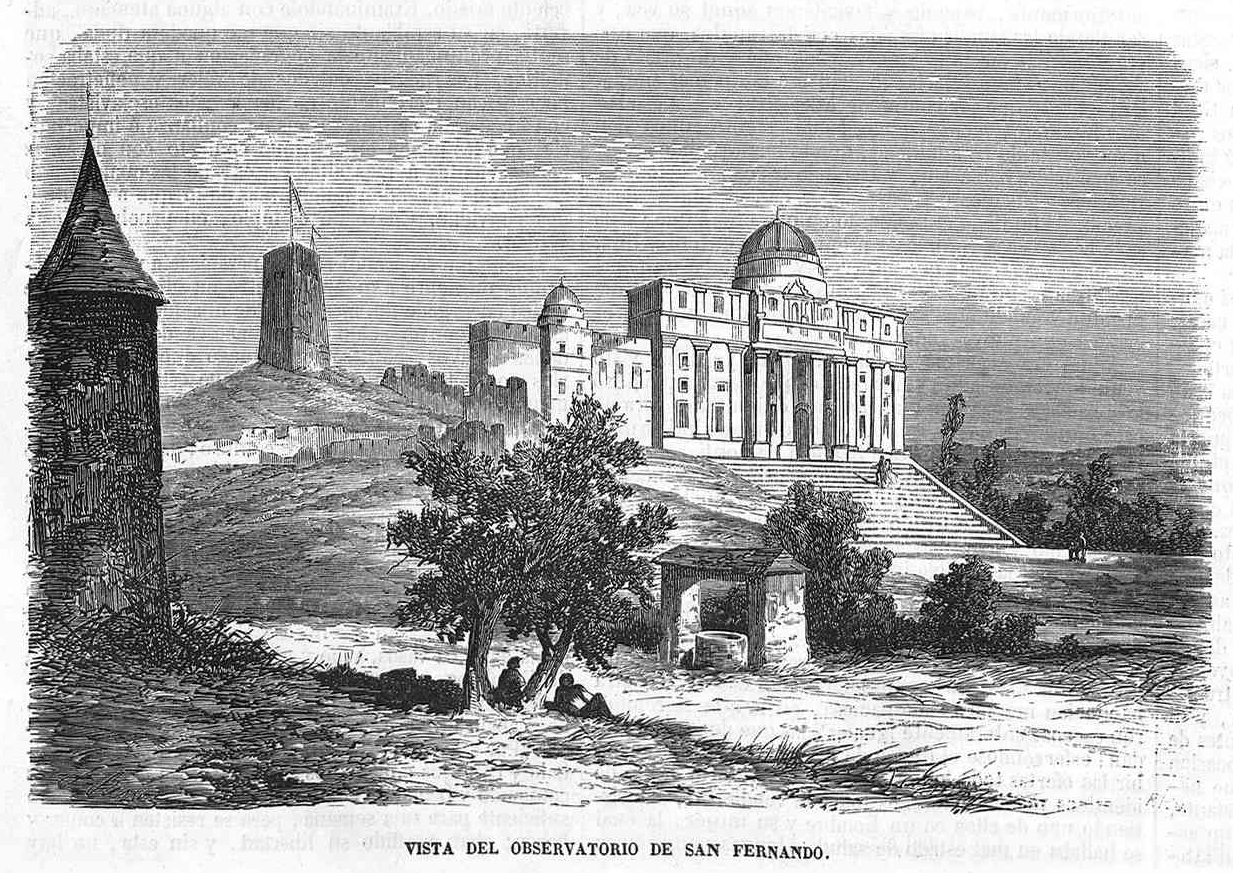
Vista Del

Torre Alta is a tower located in San Fernando in the Province of Cádiz, Andalusia, Spain. Located about 120 metres (390 ft) from the Real Instituto y Observatorio de la Armada, the 18 metres (59 ft) structure is a listed Bien de Interés Cultural monument.
