= Carlos González Ragel =

Spanish painter

Carlos González Ragel (December 22, 1899 - November 28, 1969) was a Spanish painter and photographer. He was known for pictures of skeletal figures that he called "esqueletomaquia".

González staged six exhibitions, the first in 1931 at the Museum of Modern Art, the third in 1937 in Seville, the fourth in 1941 at the Swan Hotel in England and the last exhibition in 1955 also at the Swan. In 1936, González, suffering from alcoholism, entered the Psychiatric Hospital of Malaga. After leaving the hospital, his condition deteriorated again and he was admitted to the Psychiatric Hospital in Seville. Soon after his last exhibition in 1955, González was admitted to the sanatorium of St. John of God in Ciempozuelos, where he spent the rest of his life, although he continued to draw and paint. From December 2007 to March 2008, the Reina Sofía held an exhibition of his works entitled The Spanish Night.

== Early life ==
González was born in Jerez de la Frontera, Spain on December 22, 1899. His father, Diego González Lozano, owned a photography studio. González's mother died when he was only nine.

González attended the College of the Marianists, but dropped out. When he was 16, he and his brother Diego moved to Madrid and González. After his father's, González returned to Jerez and worked with his brother Javier, in his father's photography studio. He enrolled in the School of Arts and Crafts, but did not complete his studies.

== Career ==
González began exhibiting pictures of skeletal figures that he called "esqueletomaquia". González staged six exhibitions. He opened the first on February 16, 1931 with figures as skeletons in the Museum of Modern Art. The exhibition emphasized drawings and caricatures, from politicians to ordinary people.

After the photography studio closed, he spent his time painting, with periods of high production and others of inactivity. Jose Franco said in an article published in World Chart in 1931 that González works are full of "satirical prints" with which the author makes a critical social and human aspects of the time using "metamorphosis and deformation reality."

In 1936, González, suffering from alcoholism, first entered the Psychiatric Hospital of Malaga. After leaving the hospital, he and his wife Amalia went to Seville. However, his condition deteriorated again and he was admitted to the Psychiatric Hospital in Seville.

In 1937, González held his third exhibition in Seville, exhibiting esqueleotomaquias of celebrities and politicians.

In 1941, he held its fourth exhibition Swan Hotel. From that date onwards, his painting became darker.

In 1955 González held his last exhibition at the Swan Hotel. He was soon admitted to the sanatorium of St. John of God in Ciempozuelos, where he spent the rest of his life. González continued to draw and paint. He created esqueletomaquias of Don Quixote, Goya, and Van Gogh.

== Death and legacy ==
González died n November 28, 1969.

From December 2007 to March 2008, an exhibition entitled The Spanish Night was held at the Reina Sofía in Madrid, featuring twelve of his works.
