= Convento de San José =

Convento de San José may refer to:

- Convento de San José (Ávila), Spain
- Convento de San José (Jerez de la Frontera), Spain
