= List of mayors of Jerez de la Frontera =

This is a list of mayors of Jerez de la Frontera.

== Mayors of Jerez de la Frontera ==
- Julio González Hontoria (1905 –1907)
- Francisco de P. Velarde Beigbeder (1909)
- Juan Cortina de la Vega (1909)
- José M.a Fernández Gao (1909)
- Francisco Fernández del Castillo (1909)
- Conde de Puerto Hermoso (1910)
- Julio González Hontoria (1914)
- Pedro L. Lassaletta Crussoe (1915)
- Manuel Ant. de la Riva González (1916)
- Manuel Gutiérrez Quijano (1916)
- Julio González Hontoria (1916)
- Francisco Álvarez Antón (1917)
- Pedro Díaz López (1917)
- Marcelino Picardo Celis (1917)
- Pablo Porro Bermejo (1918)
- José García-Mier y Fdez. de los Ríos (1918)
- Diego Belarde Santisteban (1919)
- Dionisio García Pelayo y Cordoncillo (1920)
- Pedro Díaz López (1921)
- José González Pineda (1921)
- Dionisio García Pelayo y Cordoncillo (1923)
- Eduardo Freyre y García de Leaniz (1923)
- Marqués de Villamarta (1923)
- Federico de Isási y Dávila (1925)
- Enrique Rivera Pastor (1928)
- Juan J. Sánchez y Sánchez Balias (1930)
- Santiago Lozano Corralón (1930)
- Manuel Moreno Mendoza (1931)
- Francisco Germá Alsina (1931)
- Juan Narváez Ortega (1933)
- Manuel Diez Hidalgo (1935)
- Francisco Germá Alsina (1936)
- Antonio Oliver Villanueva (1936)
- Ramón García-Pelayo (1958)
- Tomás García Figueras (1958-1965)
- Miguel Primo de Rivera y Urquijo (1965-1971)
- Manuel Cantos Ropero (1971-1976)
- Jesús Mantaras García-Figueras (1976-1978)
- José Pérez Luna (1978)
- Juan Manuel Corchado Moreno (1978-1979)
- Jerónimo Martínez Beas (1979)
- Pedro Pacheco Herrera, PA/PSA (1979-2003)
- María José García-Pelayo Jurado, PP (2003-2005)
- Pilar Sánchez Muñoz, PSOE (2005-2011)
- María José García-Pelayo Jurado, PP (2011-2015)
- Mamen Sánchez, PSOE (2015-Actually)
