= Mamen Sánchez =

Spanish politician (born 1968)

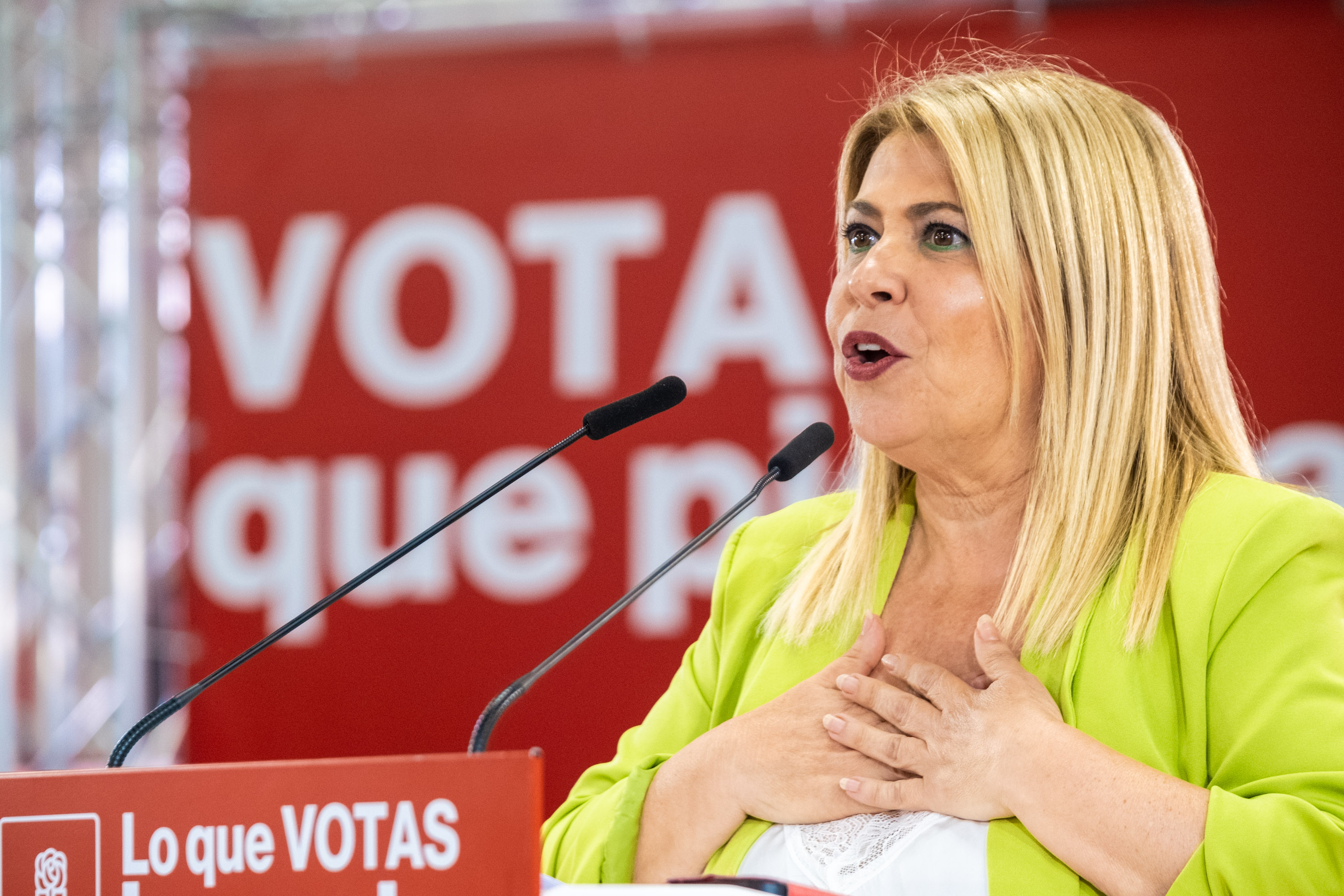
- Sánchez in 2023

Member of the Congress of Deputies
- Incumbent
- Assumed office 17 August 2023
- Constituency: Cádiz
- In office 5 April 2000 – 27 October 2015
- Constituency: Cádiz

Personal details
- Born: 10 October 1968 (age 57)
- Party: Spanish Socialist Workers' Party

María del Carmen Sánchez Díaz (born 10 October 1968), better known as Mamen Sánchez, is a Spanish politician. She has been a member of the Congress of Deputies since 2023, having previously served from 2000 to 2015. From 2015 to 2023, she served as mayor of Jerez de la Frontera.
