= Palacio de Campo Real =

Coordinates: 36°41′02″N 6°08′35″W

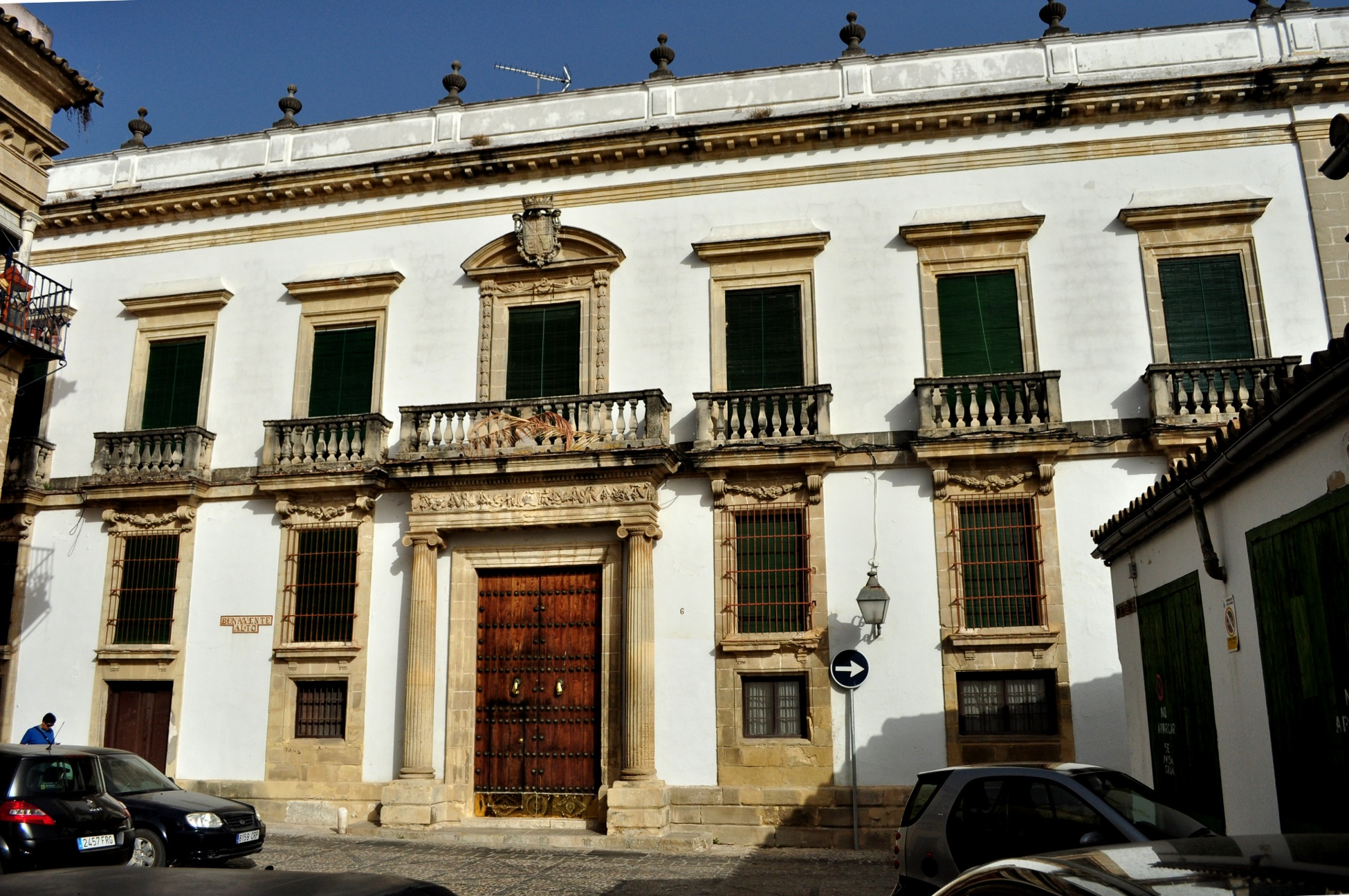
- Interactive map of Palacio de Campo Real
- Location: Jerez de la Frontera, Province of Cádiz, Andalusia, Spain

History
- Built: 1545-1785

Site notes
- Architect: José Vargas y Sánchez
- Architectural style: Renaissance - Neoclassical

Spanish Cultural Heritage
- Type: Non-movable
- Criteria: Monument

Palacio de Campo Real is a palace in Jerez de la Frontera, in the Province of Cádiz, in southern Spain. It was built in 1545. It has been declared a Bien de Interés Cultural site.

== History ==
According to tradition, when the city was conquered by Alfonso X the Wise, he granted the site of the current palace to a noble knight of the city who had helped him in the conquest. The noble families gradually intermixed with other noble families in the city, like the Benavente and Cabeza de Vaca families in the 16th century.

The origin of the building, according to the headstone on display in the doorway of the residence, dates from 1545, built by Pedro Benavente Cabeza de Vaca and Carvajal on the remains of an Islamic building.

The heirs of the property were the Marqueses de Campo Real.

== Description ==
The current façade is of mixed Renaissance and Neoclassical style and was built in 1785 by José Vargas y Sánchez. It consists of two floors. The main door is flanked by two Ionic columns and above it, a balcony framed by an arch.

The patio is rectangular with four sides and is decorated with plant and heraldic motifs. One of the medallions represents the marriage of Pedro Banavente and Beatriz Bernalte.

== Currently ==
Historically, the ancient palace has hosted grand galas, charity parties, and classical music concerts.

It is currently privately owned by Manuel Alfonso de Domecq-Zurita, Viscount of Almocadén, a member of the San Dionisio de Jerez Royal Academy of Sciences, Arts and Letters.

== See also ==
- List of Bien de Interés Cultural in the Province of Cádiz
