= Palace of Viceroy Laserna =

Palace in Andalusia, Spain

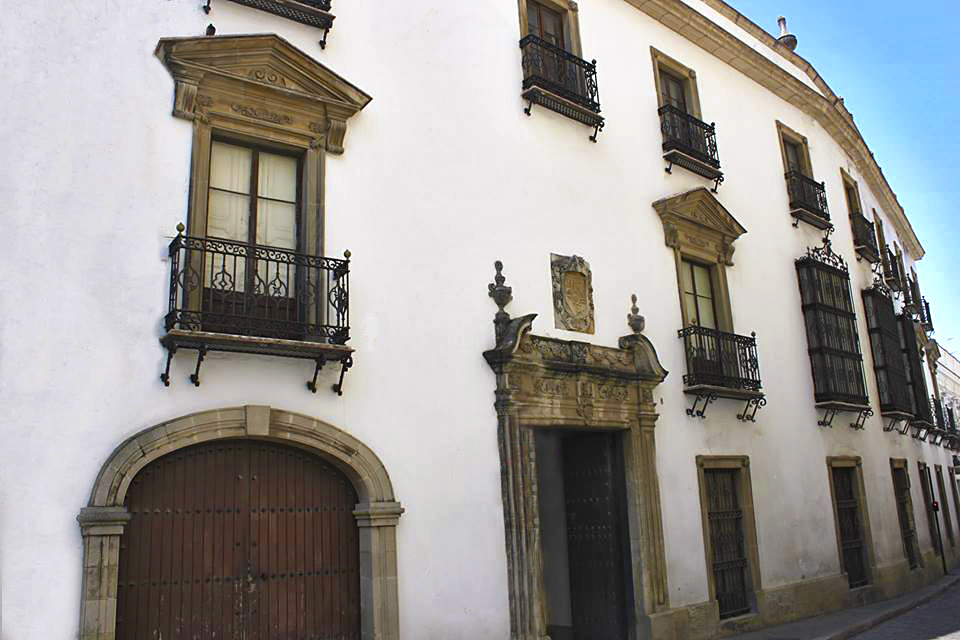

The Palace of Viceroy Laserna (also known as Palace of the Counts of the Andes) is a palace in Jerez de la Frontera, Andalusia, Spain. It has a neoclassical style, with details from previous styles.

== History ==
The palace is built on top of the foundations of an arab palace. After refurbishment work in the building, a plaster of the Nasrid dynasty of the XIII century was found. The palace has been in the same family since the reconquest of Jerez in the XIII century. In the XVIII century it went through a refurbishment that gave it the neoclassical aspect that it has today. Also in the XVIII century José de la Serna y Martínez de Hinojosa, first Count of the Andes and last Viceroy of Peru was born in the house. The palace is named Palace of Viceroy Laserna, in his honor. Since then it has been the residence of the Counts of the Andes.

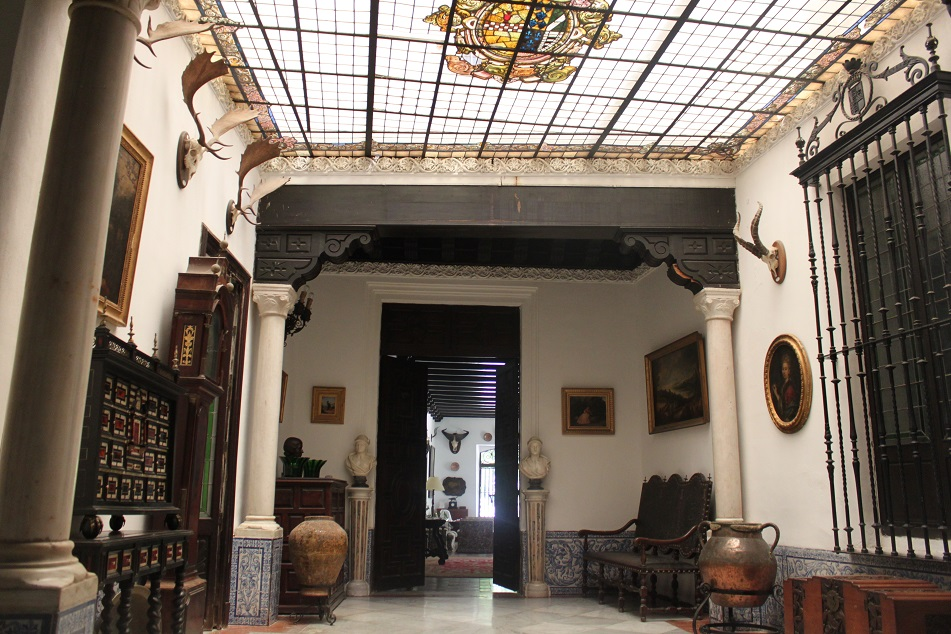
Entrance Patio to the palace

== Maintenance ==
The palace is in a great state of maintenance, due to having been the continually inhabited traditional residence of the Count of the Andes (Condado de los Andes).

== Heritage ==
The Palace has many pieces of art. It has been opened for visits since April 2015. According to the Furniture History Society of London, it has one of the finest art collections in Andalusia.

== Annexed building ==
In 1925, because of the canonical coronation of Our Lady of Mount Carmel in Jerez de la Frontera in April, Francisco Moreno Zuleta, 6th Count of the Andes, ordered the construction of a new building annexed to the Palace to host the government officials who came to the event. This building is now a part of the palace and has a small hotel.

== Corral de comedias ==
During the 17th century there was a corral de comedias where the garden of the Palace is now. Its entrance was in Santa Isabel Street.
