= Palacio del Marqués de Montana =

Domecq Palace
- Palacio Domecq (Spanish); Palacio del Marqués de Montana (Spanish)
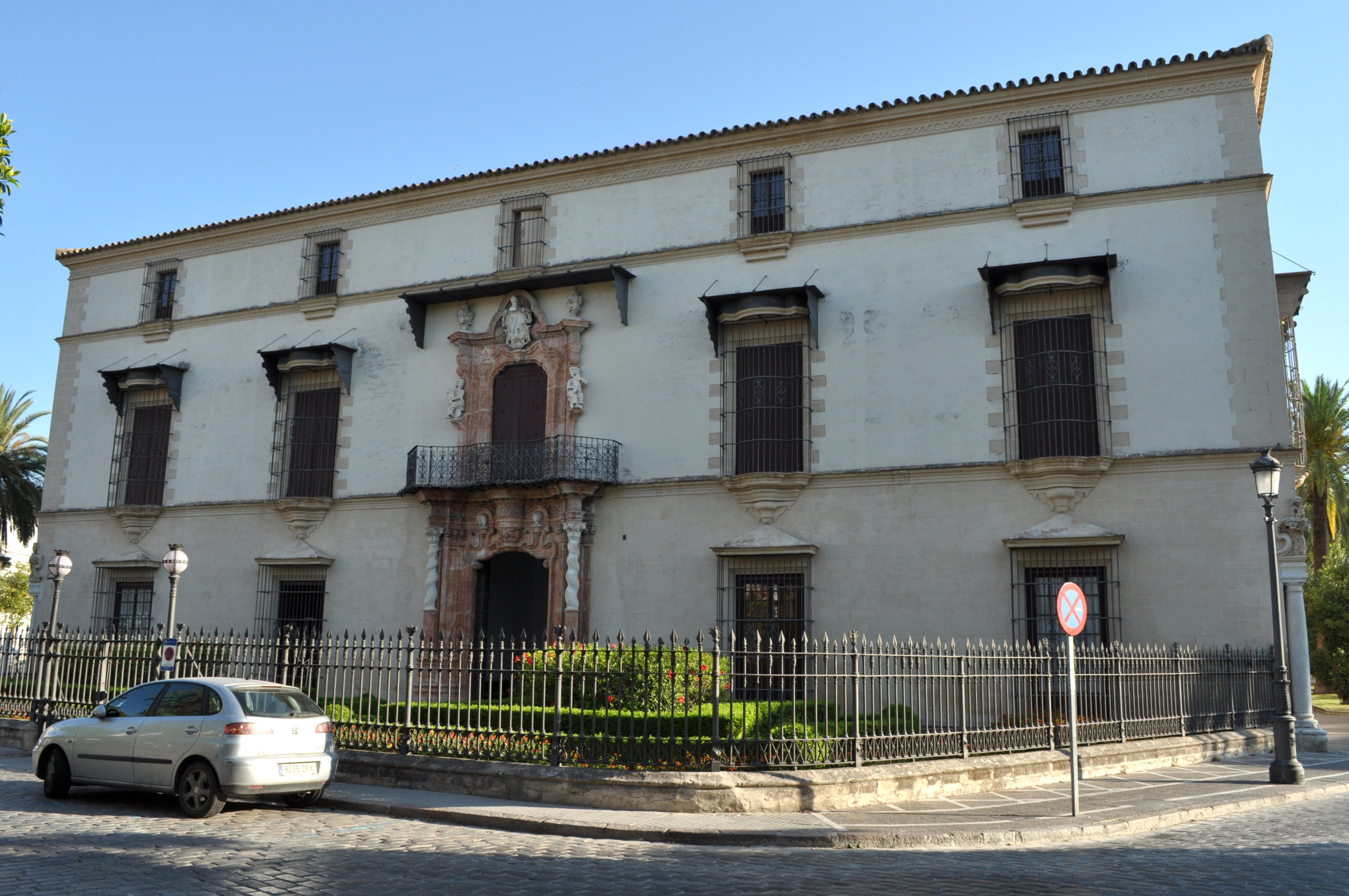

- Location within Spain
- 36.687160°N 6.136922°W
- Location: Jerez de la Frontera, Spain

History
- Built: 1776

Site notes
- Area: Cádiz
- Architect: Antonio Matías de Figueroa
- Architectural style: Andalusian baroque

Spanish Cultural Heritage
- Official name: Palacio Domecq
- Type: Non-movable
- Criteria: Monument
- Designated: 2002
- Reference no.: RI-51-0005370

The Domecq Palace, old Palace of Marqués de Montana (Spanish: Antiguo Palacio del Marqués de Montana) is a palace located in Jerez de la Frontera, Spain. It was declared Bien de Interés Cultural in 2002.
