= Swan Hotel, Bradford-on-Avon =

Hotel in Bradford-on-Avon, Wiltshire, England

Coordinates: 51°20′52″N 2°15′04″W

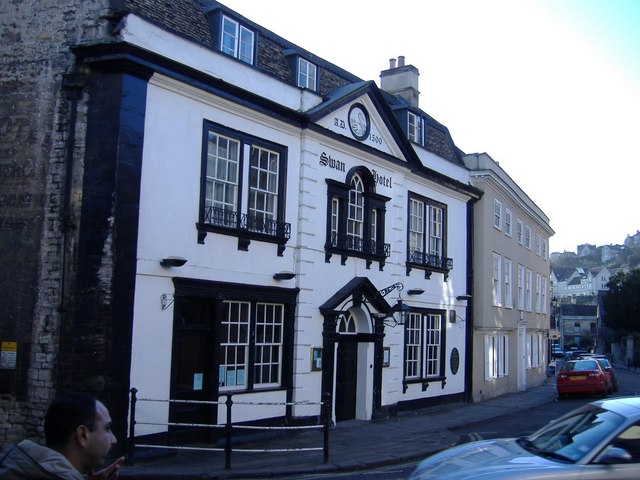
The Swan Hotel in 2007

The Swan Hotel is a Grade II* listed hotel in Church Street, Bradford-on-Avon, Wiltshire, England. It is of uncertain age but probably dates from the seventeenth century.
