= Jerez de la Frontera =

City in Cádiz, Spain

- Municipality
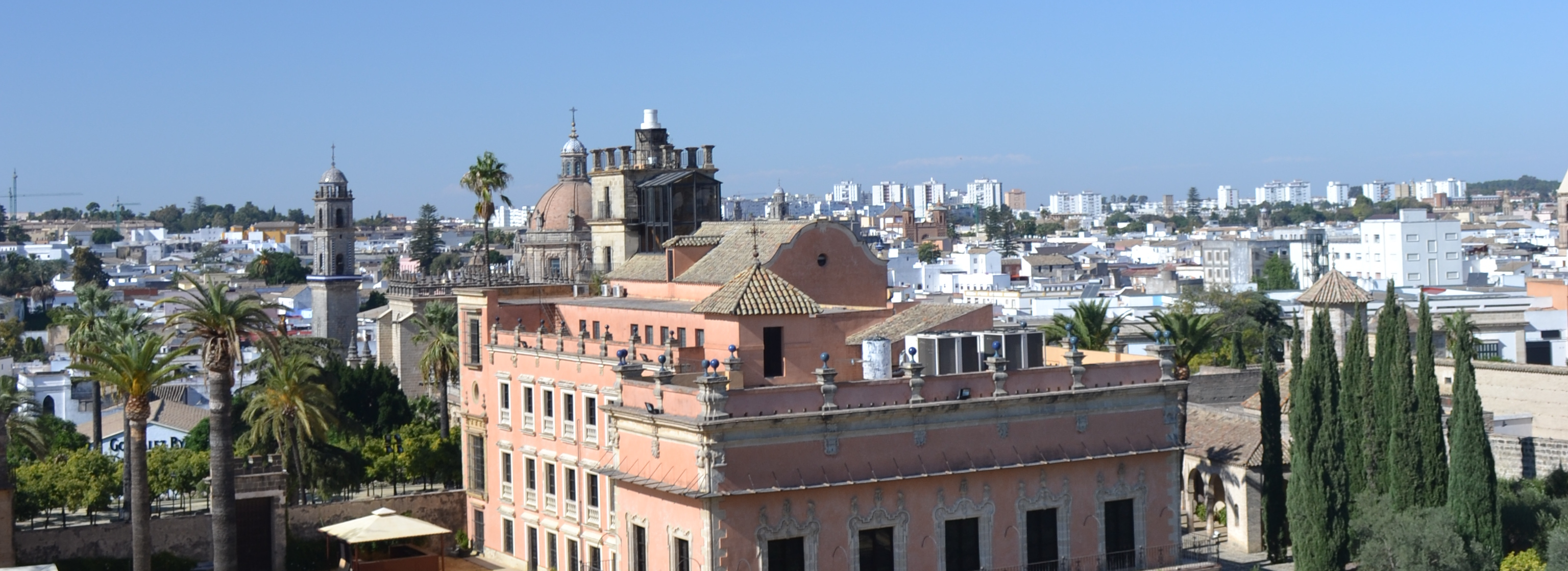

- Flag Coat of arms
- Interactive map of Jerez de la Frontera
- Coordinates: 36°40′54″N 06°08′16″W
- Country: Spain
- Autonomous community: Andalusia
- Province: Cádiz

Government
  - Mayor: María José García-Pelayo (PP)

Area
  - Total: 1,187.92 km^{2} (458.66 sq mi)
- Elevation: 56 m (184 ft)

Population (2024)
  - Total: 214,844
  - Rank: 26th in Spain
  - Density: 180.857/km^{2} (468.418/sq mi)
- Demonym: Jerezanos
- Time zone: UTC+1 (CET)
  - Summer (DST): UTC+2 (CEST)
- Postal code: 11401 – 11409
- Website: www.jerez.es

Jerez de la Frontera (Spanish pronunciation: [xeˈɾeθ ðe la fɾonˈteɾa]) or simply Jerez or Xeres, is a city and municipality in the province of Cádiz in the autonomous community of Andalusia, Spain. Located in southwestern Iberia, it lies on the Campiña de Jerez, an inland lowland plain crossed by the Guadalete River, midway between the Atlantic Ocean, the Guadalquivir river and the western reaches of the Subbaetic System.

With a population of 214,844, Jerez de la Frontera is the most populated municipality in the province of Cádiz, and the fifth in Andalusia. The municipality covers an area of 1,188.14 km^{2} (458.74 sq mi) and includes Los Alcornocales Natural Park.

The area's record of human presence includes the nearby site of Asta Regia with occupation since perhaps the Atlantic Bronze Age up to the 10th century. Information about the current settlement is scarce before the 12th century under the Almohads, when it grew into the largest urban centre in between Seville and the Strait of Gibraltar. Jerez was conquered by the Crown of Castile in 1261. Winegrowing has long been Jerez's primary economic driver, particularly with the transition to modern agro-extractivism in the mid-18th century. Jerez and its surroundings are noted for the production of local grapes into Sherry wines. For most of the 19th century, the local wine was overwhelmingly produced for foreign export, preeminently catering to the British market. In this period, the city gained a reputation as a paradigm for large landowners and high levels of social inequality, as well as its winery-related identity.

Since 1987, Grand Prix motorcycle racing has been held at the Circuito de Jerez in early May. The circuit has also hosted several Formula One Grands Prix, including the 1997 European Grand Prix, which decided the 1997 Formula One World Championship. Other festivals in the city include the Feria de Jerez and Holy Week.

== Etymology ==
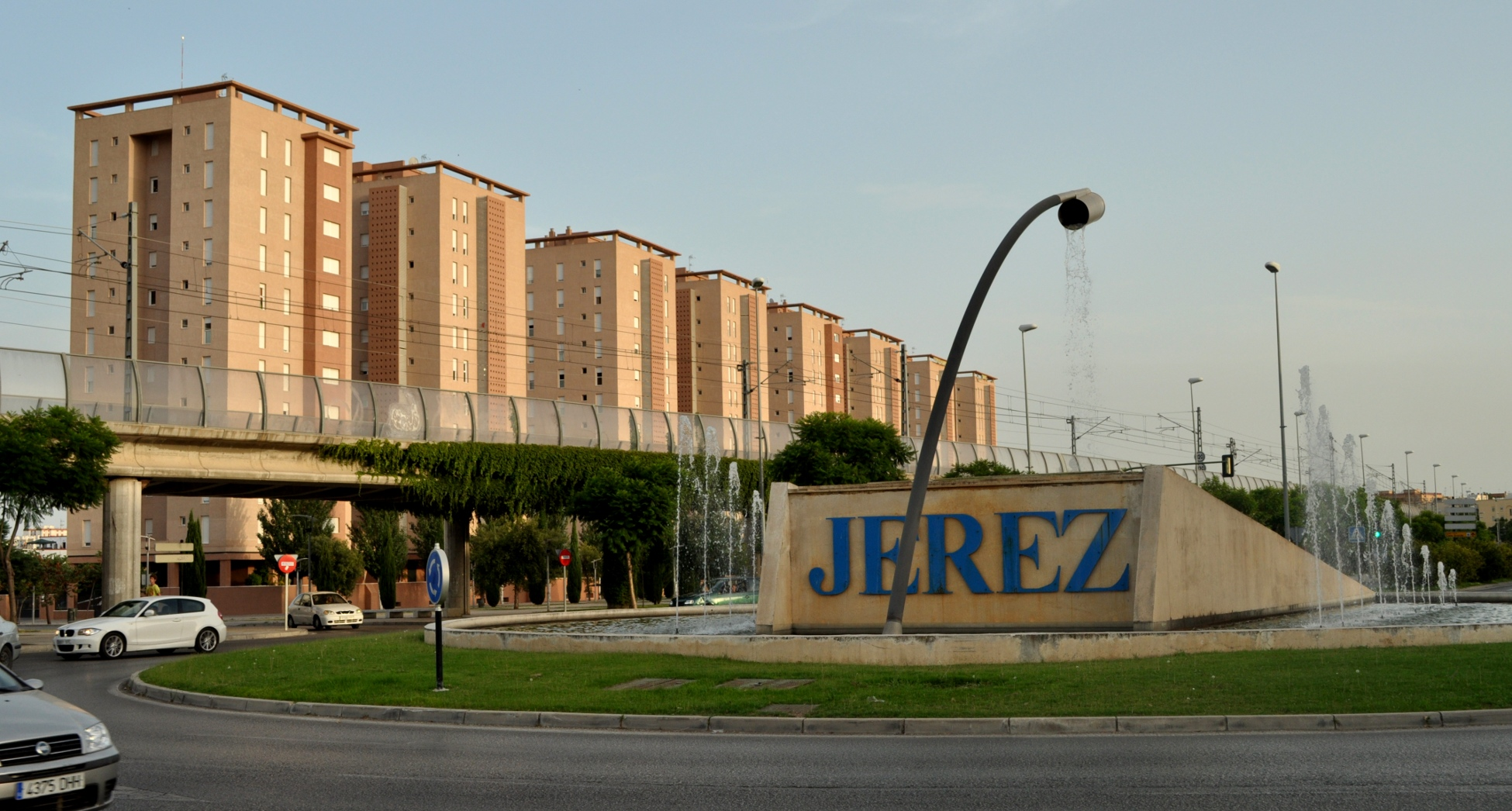
Venencia Roundabout, also known as Catavino Roundabout

The classical Latin name of Asta Regia, unrelated to the present name, referred to an ancient city now found within Mesas de Asta, a rural district approximately 11 km (6.84 mi) from the center of Jerez.

The current Spanish-language name came by way of the Arabic-language name شريش Sharīsh, used during the Muslim period in Iberia. The placename was rendered as Xerez or Xerés (Old Spanish pronunciation: [ʃeˈɾet͡s̻, ʃeˈɾes̺]) in old Romance sources; hence the name of the famous fortified wine, sherry. Frontera ('frontier') referred to its location on the border between the Moorish and Christian regions on the Iberian Peninsula during the 13th century. Upon the Modern-era readjustment and simplification of Spanish-language sibilant phonemes (including /ʃ/ changed into /x/) the spelling of the place name ended up being changed accordingly.

The old spelling Xerez survived in several foreign languages and led to the name given to sherry: Portuguese Xerez [ʃɨˈɾɛʃ], Catalan Xerès [ʃəˈɾɛs], English sherry /ˈʃɛri/, French xérès [ɡzeʁɛs]. The city's main football team continues to use the old spelling, Xerez.

== History ==
=== Prehistory and ancient history ===
Traces of human presence in the area date from the upper Neolithic, and humans have inhabited Jerez de la Frontera since at least the Copper or Neolithic Age, but the identity of the first natives remains unclear. The first major protohistoric settlement in the area (around the third millennium BC) is attributed to the Tartessians. Jerez later became a Roman city under the name of Asta Regia (located 8 km further north at Cortijo el Rosario).

=== Middle Ages ===
After the collapse of the Western Roman Empire, the Vandals and the Visigoths ruled the area until the Umayyad conquest of Hispania in the early 8th century. In the 11th century it briefly became the seat of an independent taifa. Some years later 'Abdun ibn Muhammad united it with Arcos de la Frontera and ruled both (ca. 1040–1053). In 1053 it was annexed to Seville. From 1145 to 1147 the region of Arcos and Jerez briefly operated as an emirate under the dependency of Granada, led by Abu'l-Qasim Ahyal. Later the Almohads conquered the city. In the 12th and 13th centuries Jerez underwent a period of great development, building its defense system and setting the current street layout of the old town.

In 1231 the Battle of Jerez took place within Jerez. Christian troops under the command of Álvaro Pérez de Castro, lord of the House of Castro and grandson of Alfonso VII, king of Castile and León, defeated the troops of the Emir Ibn Hud, despite the numerical superiority of the latter. After a month-long siege in 1261, the city surrendered to Castile, but its Muslim population remained. It rebelled and was finally defeated in 1264.

Due to its agriculture-based economy and demographics, Jerez was already a major city of the Lower Andalusia towards the end of the Middle Ages.

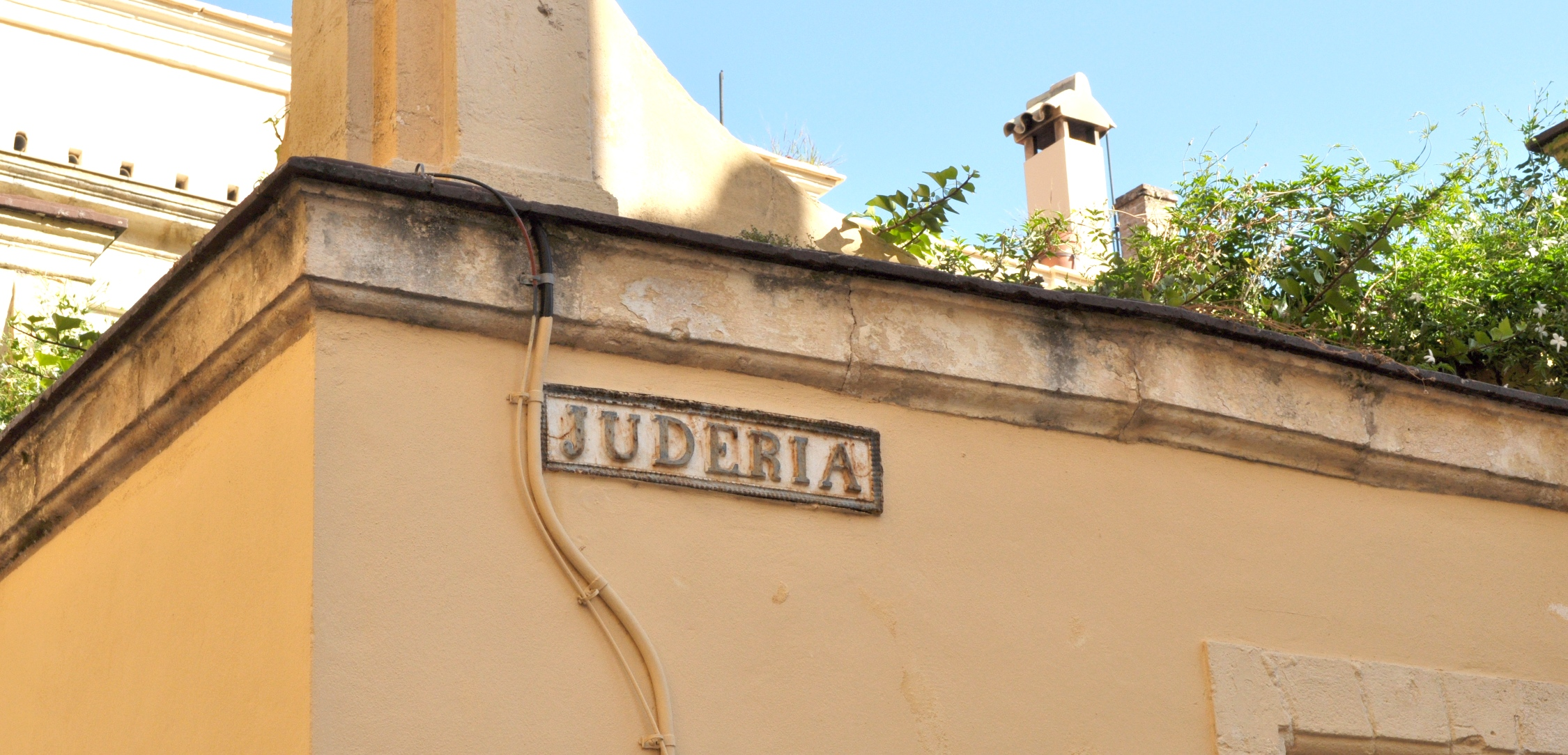
Juderia street in Jerez.

Historically, a Jewish community existed in Jerez until the 1492 expulsion of the Jews. Today the street "Juderia", meaning Jewish quarter in Spanish, in Jerez marks where the old Jewish quarter once existed.

=== Early modern period ===
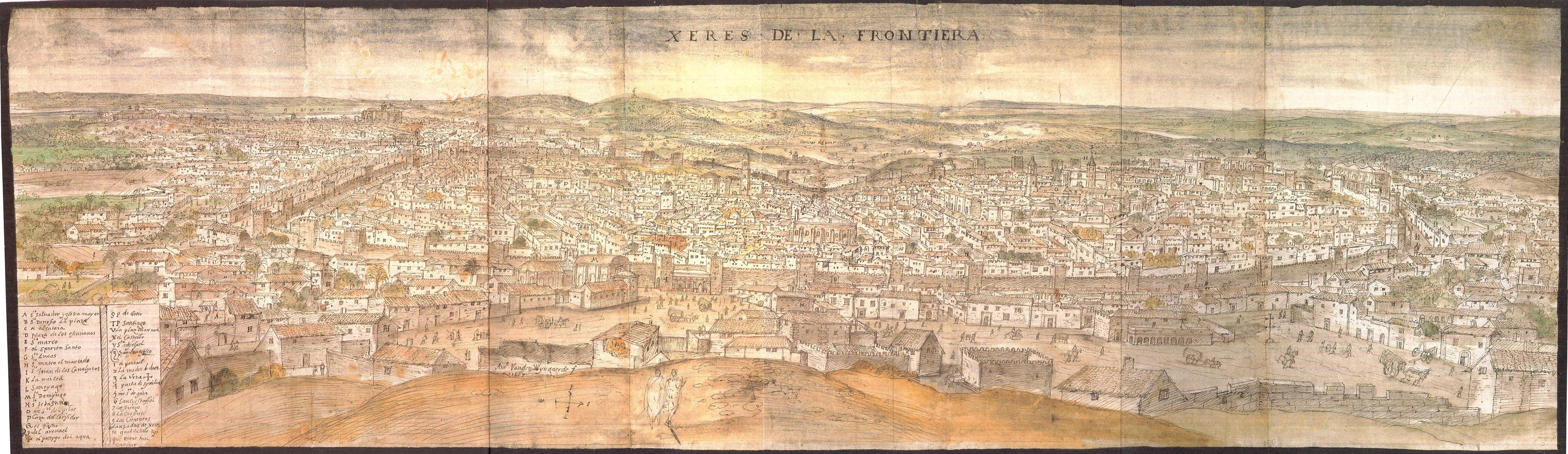
Jerez in the 1560s, by Anton van den Wyngaerde, as seen from the North–East.

The discovery of the Americas and the conquest of Granada, in 1492, made Jerez one of the most prosperous cities of Andalusia through trade and through its proximity to the ports of Seville and Cádiz. Attracted by the economic possibilities offered by the winemaking business, a substantial foreign European population (English, Flemish, Portuguese and, most notably, Genoese) installed in the city. Together with the local wealthy class, they participated in slave ownership.

Despite the social, economic and political decadence that occurred in the seventeenth century, towards the end of the Habsburg rule, the city managed to maintain a reasonable pace of development, becoming world-famous for its wine industry.

=== Late modern period ===
In January 1892, a peasant uprising took place in Jerez and its violent repression lead to a series of protests and revenge bombings in the next decade.

In 2026, Jerez will hold the title of Spanish Capital of Gastronomy.

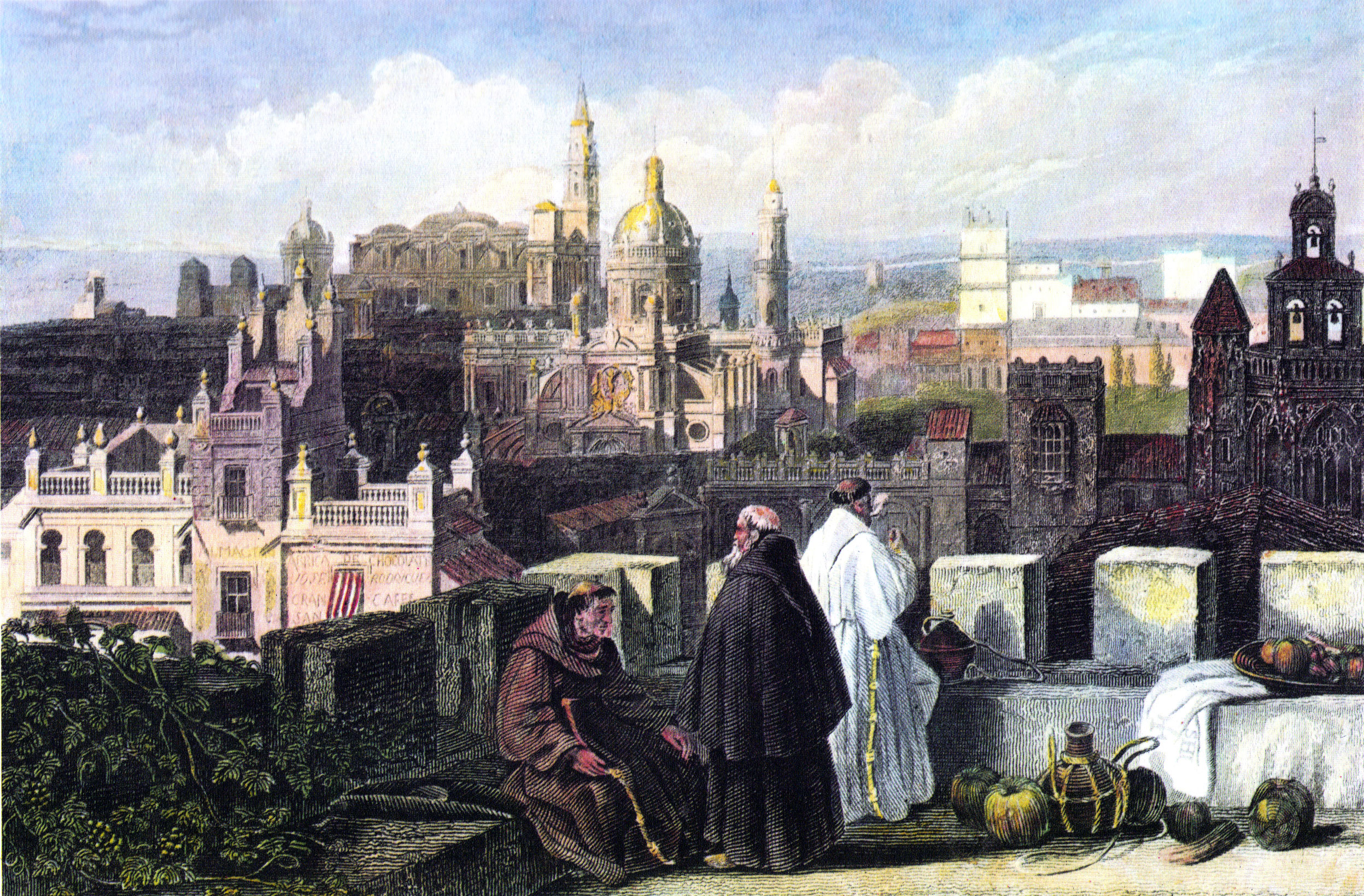
Jerez in 1835

== Geography ==
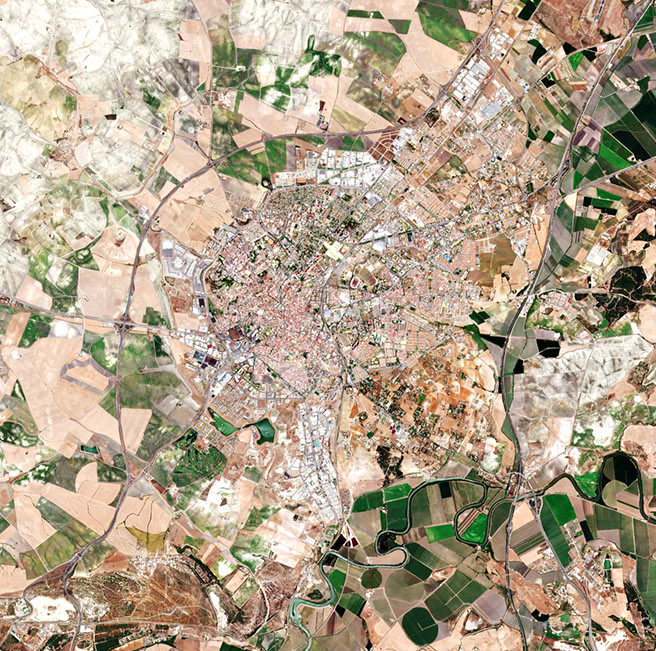
Jerez as seen by the European Space Agency's Sentinel-2 on 21 June 2019.

Jerez de la Frontera is located in the region of Campiña de Jerez, which includes the municipalities of Jerez de la Frontera and San José del Valle. The territory of the region corresponds to the previous municipality of the city of Jerez, before the disintegration of San José del Valle in 1995. The municipality of Jerez is the largest in the province of Cadiz and the sixth in Spain with 1188 square kilometers.

The region of the Campiña de Jerez is crossed by the Guadalete River. There are several wetlands in its territory, such as the lagoons of Medina and Torrox. There are also the Montes de Propio de Jerez, included in the Natural Park of Los Alcornocales. Its agriculture is known for the designation of origin of its wine, sherry, grown in the triangle formed between Jerez de la Frontera, Sanlúcar de Barrameda and El Puerto de Santa María.

Jerez de la Frontera is located 6 km (3.7 mi) from El Puerto de Santa Maria, 12 km (7.5 mi) from the Atlantic Ocean and 85 km (53 mi) from the Strait of Gibraltar. The city is one of the six municipalities that make up the Metropolitan Area of the Bay of Cadiz-Jerez, a polynuclear urban agglomeration formed by the municipalities of Cadiz, Chiclana de la Frontera, Jerez de la Frontera, Puerto Real, El Puerto de Santa Maria and San Fernando located in the Bay of Cadiz.

=== Climate ===
Jerez de la Frontera and the rest of the Cádiz metropolitan area have a Subtropical–Mediterranean climate. For its situation being inland (specially the airport which is further inland than the city), the Atlantic influences are small. Jerez is characterized by mild, short winters with occasional cool nights and hot, long summers with occasional very hot temperatures; unlike the surrounding coastal areas which are characterized by very mild winters and long warm summers. Most of the rain falls from October to January, while the summers are very dry but not rainless. For its situation being inland, the daytime temperatures are higher than in the coast and the lows are cooler, with a difference of at least 10 °C between the highs and the low temperatures of each month. The average annual temperature is 24.4 °C (76 °F) during the day and 11.9 °C (53 °F) at night. The average annual precipitation is 570 mm (22.4 in) per year, concentrated in the months of October through April. December is the wettest month with 109 mm (4.3 in). The city averages 53 rainy days, 137 clear days and 2,965 hours of sunshine a year. Snow is extremely rare, and it is even more infrequent than in most of the southern European islands. The last snowfall recorded in the city happened on February 2, 1954. Since then, no snowfall has been recorded.

Climate data for Jerez de la Frontera (Jerez Airport) (1991–2020), Extremes (1921–)
Month	Jan	Feb	Mar	Apr	May	Jun	Jul	Aug	Sep	Oct	Nov	Dec	Year
Record high °C (°F)	25.3 (77.5)	29.0 (84.2)	30.6 (87.1)	33.6 (92.5)	39.4 (102.9)	42.0 (107.6)	44.7 (112.5)	45.8 (114.4)	44.6 (112.3)	36.5 (97.7)	30.8 (87.4)	26.8 (80.2)	45.8 (114.4)
Mean daily maximum °C (°F)	16.5 (61.7)	18.1 (64.6)	20.8 (69.4)	22.9 (73.2)	26.7 (80.1)	30.7 (87.3)	34.0 (93.2)	34.3 (93.7)	30.4 (86.7)	26.0 (78.8)	20.4 (68.7)	17.4 (63.3)	24.9 (76.8)
Daily mean °C (°F)	10.9 (51.6)	12.1 (53.8)	14.6 (58.3)	16.6 (61.9)	19.8 (67.6)	23.3 (73.9)	26.0 (78.8)	26.5 (79.7)	23.5 (74.3)	19.9 (67.8)	14.9 (58.8)	12.1 (53.8)	18.4 (65.1)
Mean daily minimum °C (°F)	5.3 (41.5)	6.1 (43.0)	8.3 (46.9)	10.2 (50.4)	13.0 (55.4)	15.9 (60.6)	18.0 (64.4)	18.6 (65.5)	16.6 (61.9)	13.6 (56.5)	9.3 (48.7)	6.8 (44.2)	11.8 (53.2)
Record low °C (°F)	−5.4 (22.3)	−5 (23)	−2.4 (27.7)	−2 (28)	5.0 (41.0)	7.0 (44.6)	9.8 (49.6)	10.5 (50.9)	7.0 (44.6)	2.8 (37.0)	−1 (30)	−5.4 (22.3)	−5.4 (22.3)
Average precipitation mm (inches)	67.5 (2.66)	51.0 (2.01)	53.7 (2.11)	50.4 (1.98)	34.0 (1.34)	9.2 (0.36)	0.6 (0.02)	2.5 (0.10)	33.1 (1.30)	84.5 (3.33)	85.9 (3.38)	87.1 (3.43)	559.5 (22.02)
Average precipitation days (≥ 1 mm)	6.3	6.0	6.4	6.1	3.8	1.2	0.2	0.4	2.9	6.6	7.0	7.4	54.3
Mean monthly sunshine hours	194	200	228	259	309	334	365	342	260	234	197	179	3,101
Source: Météo Climat

Climate data for Jerez de la Frontera (Jerez Airport) (1981-2010), Extremes (1921–present)
Month	Jan	Feb	Mar	Apr	May	Jun	Jul	Aug	Sep	Oct	Nov	Dec	Year
Record high °C (°F)	25.3 (77.5)	29.0 (84.2)	30.6 (87.1)	33.6 (92.5)	39.4 (102.9)	42.0 (107.6)	44.7 (112.5)	45.8 (114.4)	44.6 (112.3)	36.5 (97.7)	30.8 (87.4)	26.8 (80.2)	45.8 (114.4)
Mean daily maximum °C (°F)	16.2 (61.2)	17.8 (64.0)	20.8 (69.4)	22.2 (72.0)	25.5 (77.9)	29.9 (85.8)	33.6 (92.5)	33.5 (92.3)	30.4 (86.7)	25.5 (77.9)	20.2 (68.4)	16.9 (62.4)	24.4 (75.9)
Daily mean °C (°F)	10.7 (51.3)	12.1 (53.8)	14.6 (58.3)	16.0 (60.8)	19.0 (66.2)	22.9 (73.2)	25.9 (78.6)	26.1 (79.0)	23.7 (74.7)	19.6 (67.3)	14.9 (58.8)	12.0 (53.6)	18.2 (64.8)
Mean daily minimum °C (°F)	5.2 (41.4)	6.4 (43.5)	8.3 (46.9)	9.8 (49.6)	12.5 (54.5)	15.9 (60.6)	18.1 (64.6)	18.7 (65.7)	17.0 (62.6)	13.7 (56.7)	9.5 (49.1)	7.1 (44.8)	11.9 (53.4)
Record low °C (°F)	−5.4 (22.3)	−5 (23)	−2.4 (27.7)	−2 (28)	5.0 (41.0)	7.0 (44.6)	9.8 (49.6)	10.5 (50.9)	7.0 (44.6)	2.8 (37.0)	−1 (30)	−5.4 (22.3)	−5.4 (22.3)
Average precipitation mm (inches)	78 (3.1)	56 (2.2)	37 (1.5)	49 (1.9)	30 (1.2)	9 (0.4)	1 (0.0)	2 (0.1)	27 (1.1)	72 (2.8)	96 (3.8)	109 (4.3)	570 (22.4)
Average precipitation days (≥ 1 mm)	6	6	5	6	4	1	0	0	2	6	7	8	53
Average relative humidity (%)	77	73	67	64	60	56	52	55	61	69	75	79	66
Mean monthly sunshine hours	184	187	224	251	300	318	354	334	250	225	184	158	2,965
Source: Agencia Estatal de Meteorología

== Demographics ==
Historical population
Year	Pop.	±%
1842	33,104	—
1857	51,339	+55.1%
1877	57,488	+12.0%
1887	58,421	+1.6%
1900	60,846	+4.2%
1910	61,250	+0.7%
1920	65,012	+6.1%
1930	71,549	+10.1%
1940	86,086	+20.3%
1950	105,467	+22.5%
1960	130,210	+23.5%
1970	149,337	+14.7%
1981	175,653	+17.6%
1991	183,316	+4.4%
2001	183,273	−0.0%
2011	211,784	+15.6%
2021	213,616	+0.9%
Population size may be affected by changes in territorial area. Source: INE

As of 2024, the population of Jerez de la Frontera is 214,844, of whom 48.7% are male and 51.3% are female, compared to the nationwide average of 49.0% and 51.0% respectively. People under 16 years old make up 15.1% of the population, and people over 65 years old make up 18.5%, compared to the nationwide average of 14.3% and 20.4% respectively.

As of 2024, the foreign-born population is 12,648, equal to 5.9% of the total population. The 5 largest foreign nationalities are Moroccans (1,615), Colombians (1,399), Venezuelans (829), Ukrainians (644) and Bolivians (548). Jerez has the smallest foreign-born population, relative to its overall population, of all Spanish cities with over 200,000 people.

Foreign population by country of birth (2024)
Country	Population
Morocco	1,615
Colombia	1,399
Venezuela	829
Ukraine	644
Bolivia	548
Peru	456
Honduras	455
United Kingdom	435
Argentina	375
France	371
Germany	361
China	357
Senegal	314
Brazil	262
Dominican Republic	250

== Government ==
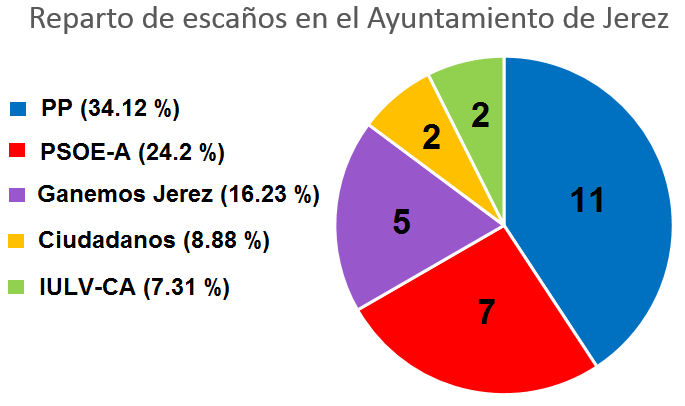
Allocation of seats, 2015

The city of Jerez is governed by the ayuntamiento (municipality) of Jerez, whose representatives, as in other towns in Spain, are elected every four years by universal suffrage for all citizens older than 18 years of age. The body is chaired by the mayor of Jerez.

== Economy ==
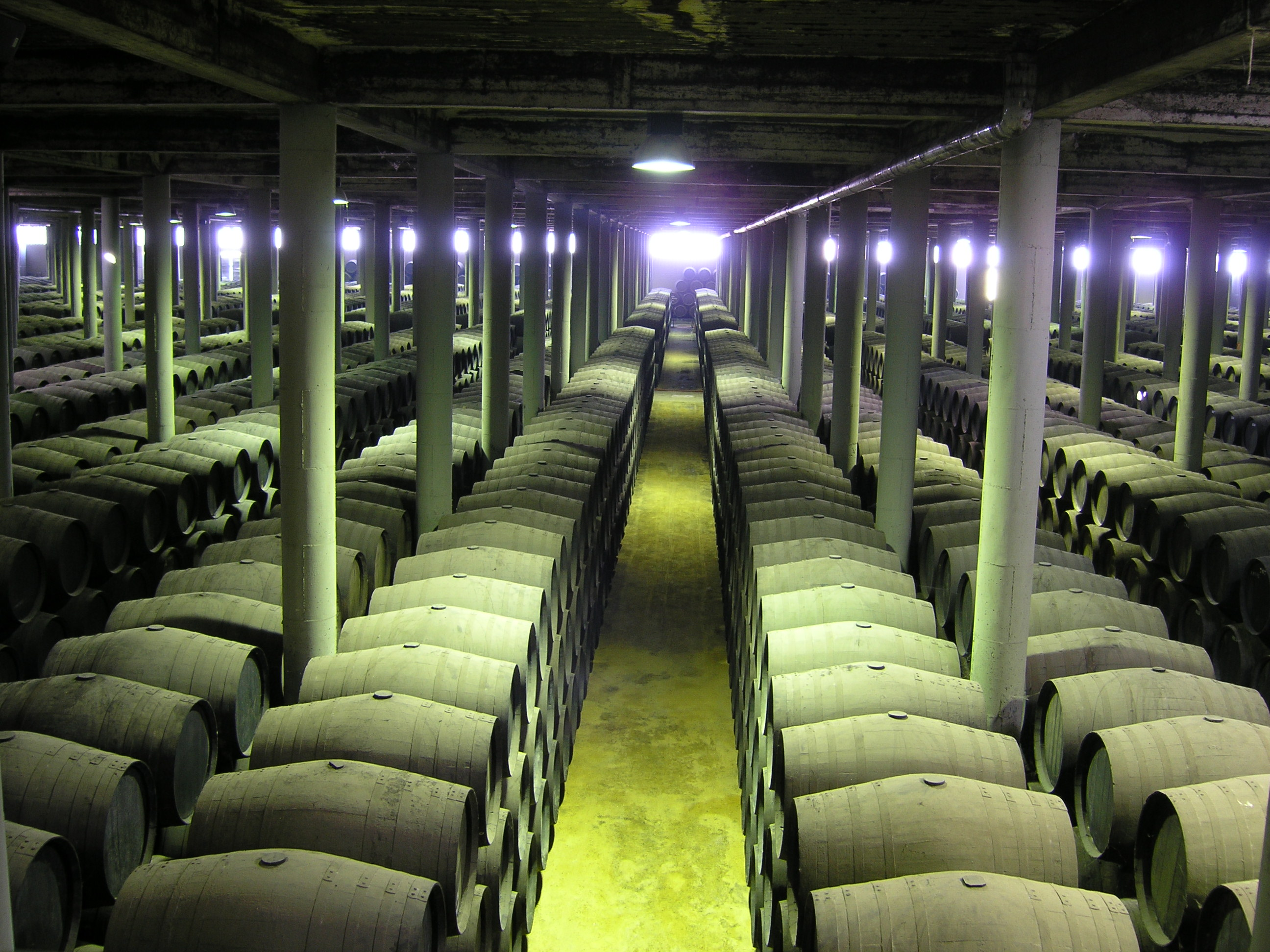
Bodegas Garvey

The economy of Jerez has traditionally been centred on the wine industry, with exports of sherry worldwide. Because it lacks the civil service that other cities enjoy, Jerez has based its economy on industry. The cultivation of fruits, grains, and vegetables and horse and cattle husbandry has also been important to the local economy. It is the home base for the Spanish Military Stud farm, the Yeguada Militar de Jerez de la Frontera.

After the wine crisis in the 1990s, the city is now seeking to expand its industrial base. Tourism has been successfully promoted. The city's strong identity as a center for wine, flamenco, and horses, its popular festivals, MotoGP hosting and its historical heritage have contributed to this success.

The city is the home of Jerez Airport and has also been positioning itself as a logistics hub for western Andalusia, through the integration between the airport, the rail system and nearby ports.

== Main sights ==
=== Religious sites ===
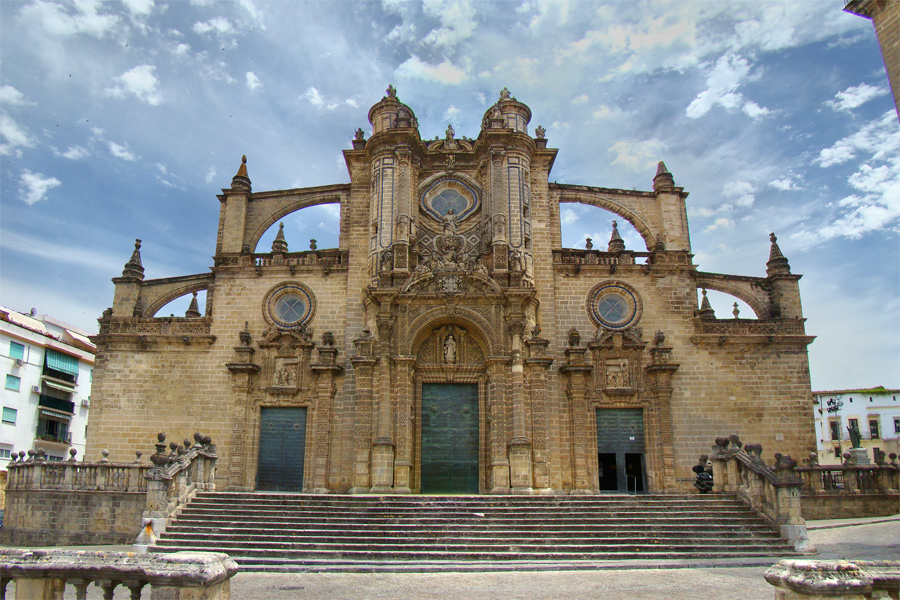
Jerez Cathedral

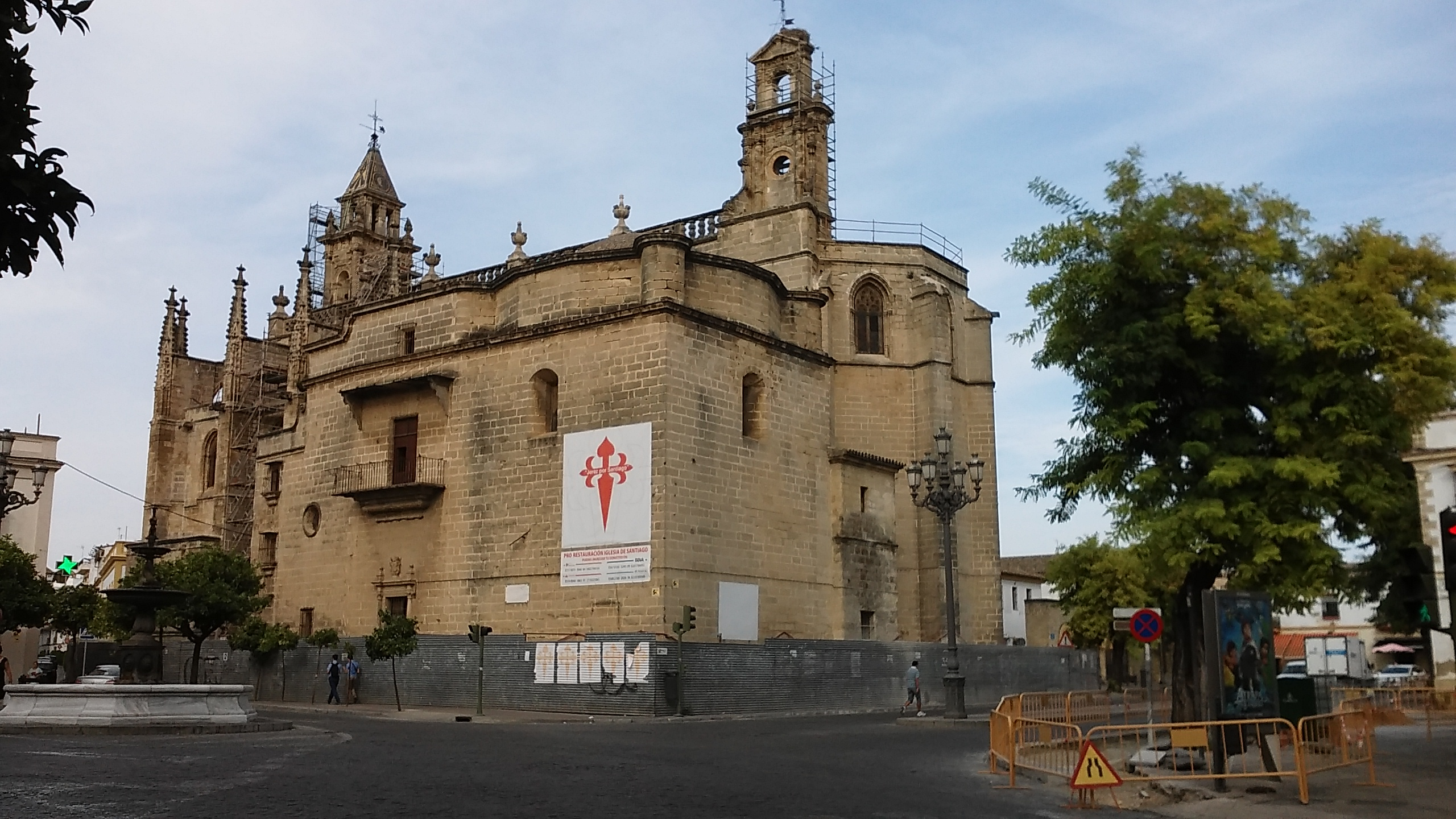
Church of Santiago

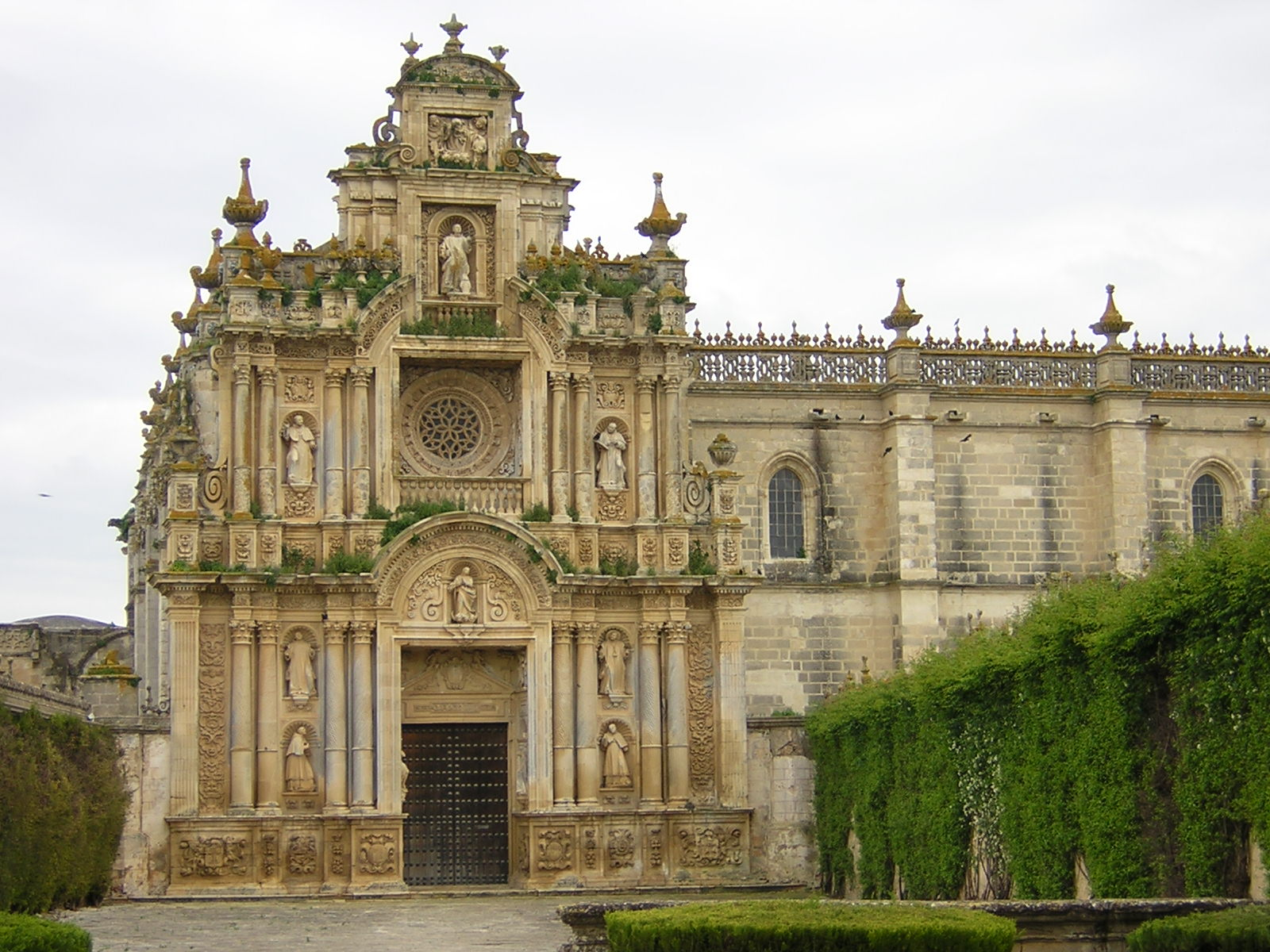
Charterhouse of Jerez

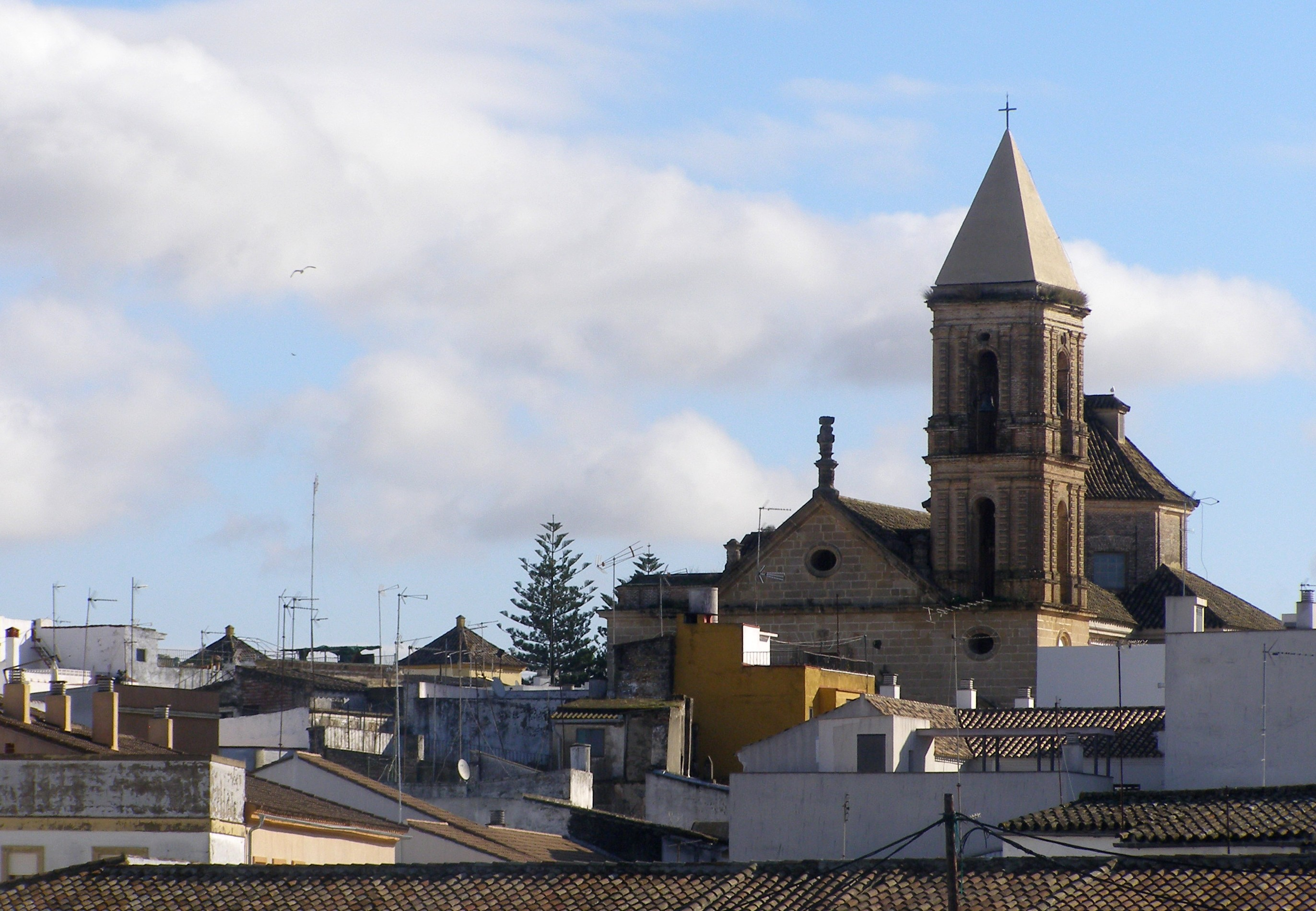
Basílica del Carmen de Jerez

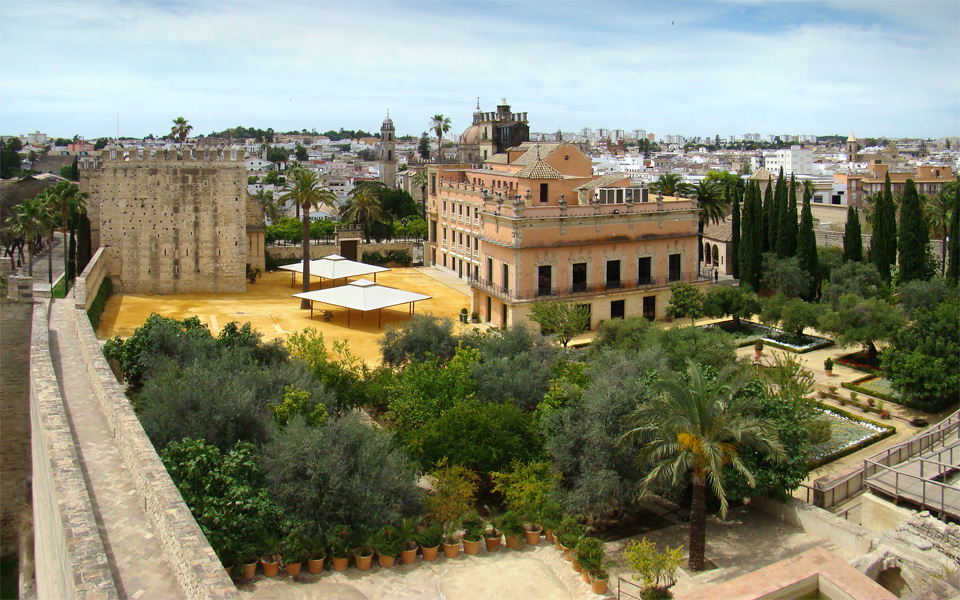
Alcazar of Jerez

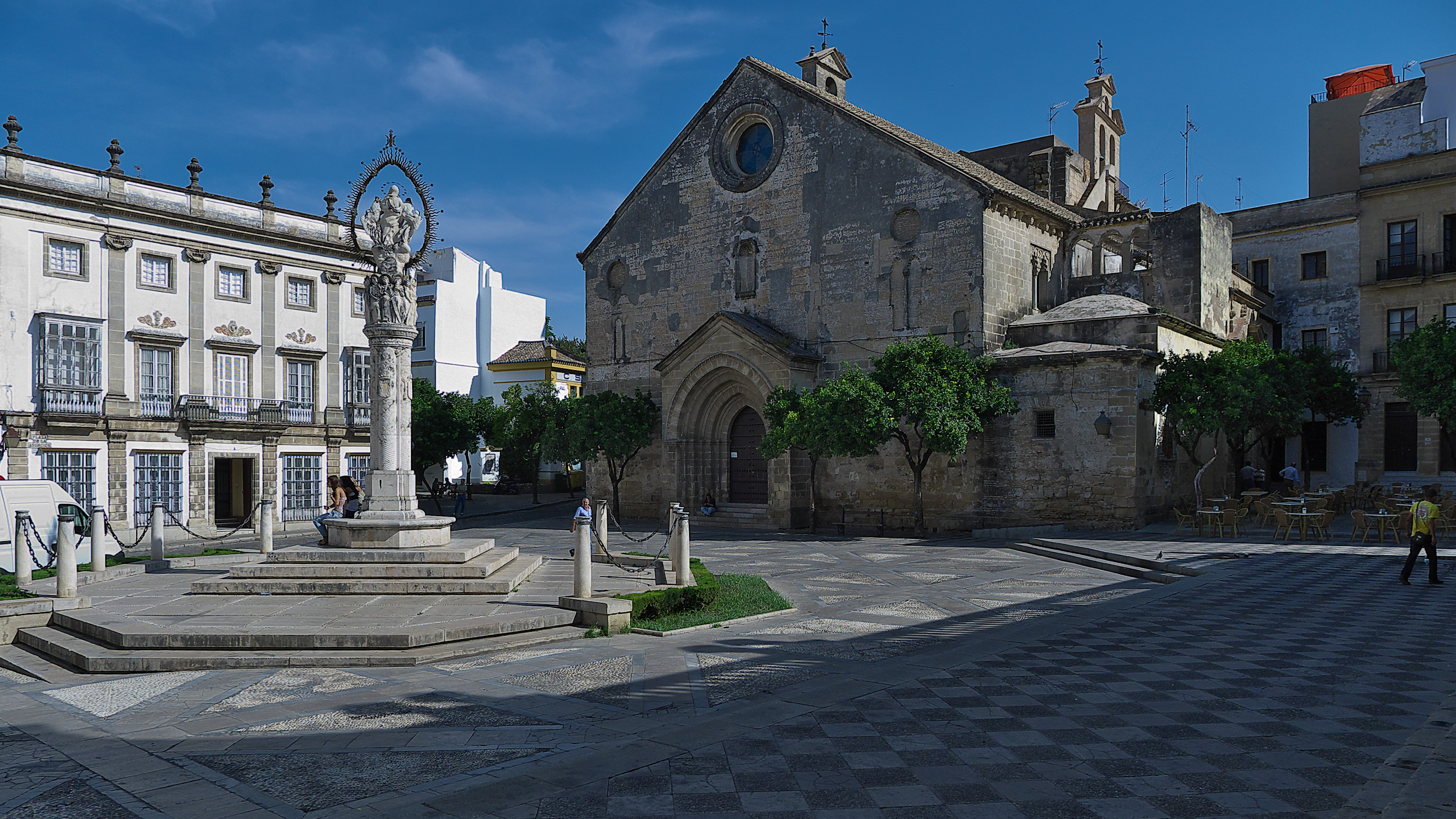
Asunción Square and Church of San Dionisio

- The Cathedral
- Church of San Miguel (15th century), in Gothic–Baroque style
- Church of San Mateo, in Gothic style, the oldest in the city
- The Charterhouse
- Church of Santiago, dating to the time of Alfonso X of Castile (reigned 1252–1284)
- Church of San Juan de los Caballeros, created after Alfonso X's conquest of the city in 1264
- Church of San Marcos (13th century)
- Church of San Dionisio (13th century), built around 1457
- Church of San Lucas, built over an old mosque
- Church of San Francisco, containing the grave of Queen Blanca de Borbón (died 1361)
- Church of San Pedro
- Chapel of San Juan de Letrán
- Calvary Chapel
- Chapel of Los Desamparados
- Convent of San José
- Convent of Santa María de Gracia
- Convento of Espíritu Santo
- Hermitage of San Isidro Labrador
- Hermitage of San Telmo
- Church of Santo Domingo
- Church of Los Descalzos
- Convent of Las Reparadoras
- Church of La Victoria
- Hermitage of La Ina
- Basílica del Carmen de Jerez

=== Palaces and manors ===
- Palace of Viceroy Laserna
- Casa-palacio de la calle Lealas, número 20
- Casa-palacio de los Ponce de León
- Casa de los Basurto
- Casa Petra de la Riva
- Palace of Marqués de Montana
- Palacio Dávila
- Palacio de Bertemati
- Palacio de Campo Real
- Palacio de Riquelme
- Palacio de los Condes de Montegil
- Palacio de los Condes de Puerto Hermoso
- Palacio de los Morla y Melgarejo
- Palacio de Luna
- Palacio de Mirabal
- Palacio de Villapanés
- Palacio de Villavicencio
- Palacio del Barón de Algar del Campo
- Palacio del Conde de los Andes
- Palacio del Marqués de Villamarta
- Palacio Duque de Abrantes
- Palacio Pemartín
- Palacio San Blas

=== Museums ===
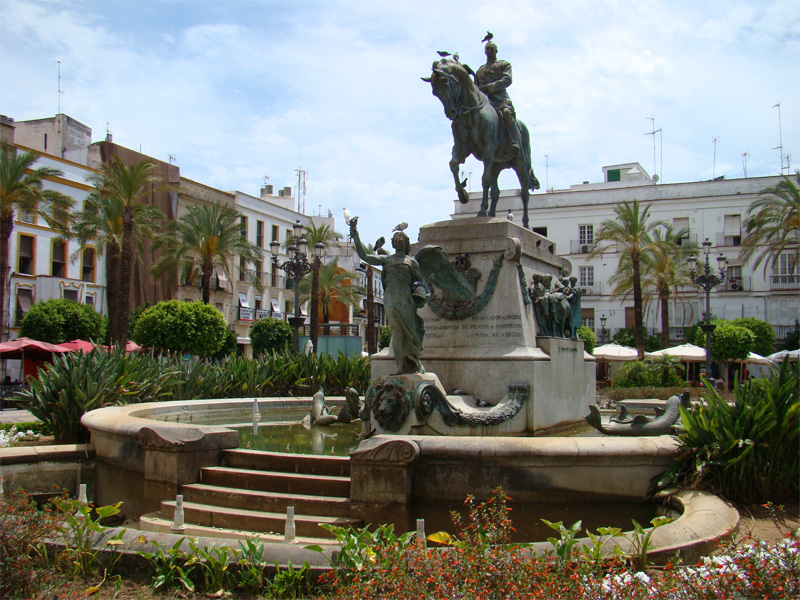
Arenal Square

- Archaeological Museum
- Bullfighting Museum
- Nativity scene Museum
- Museos de la Atalaya
- Pinacoteca Rivero
- Museo del Traje Andaluz
- Museo de Tecnología Agraria Antonio Cabral
- Museo del Enganche

=== Other monuments ===
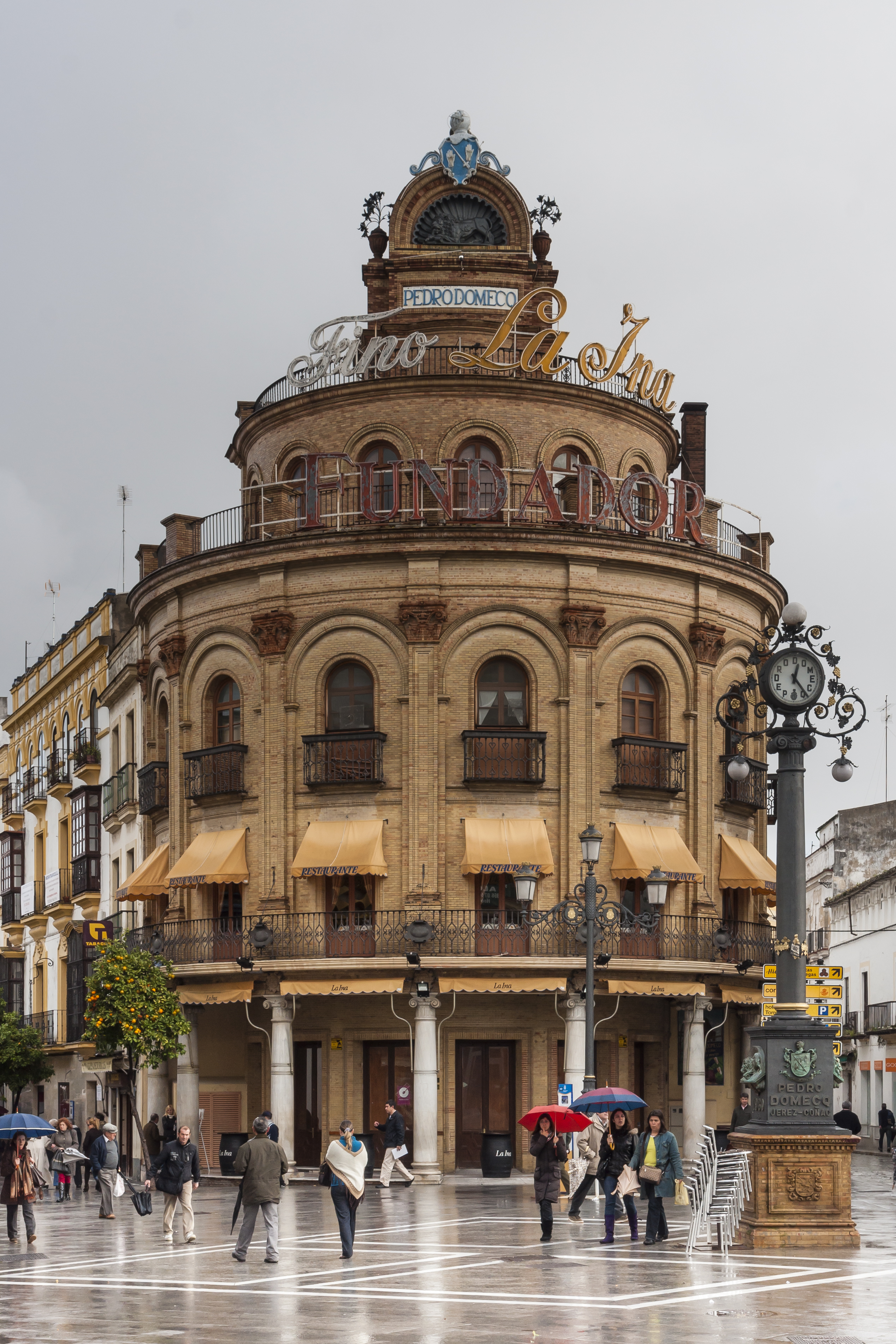
Building Gallo Azul in Jerez de la Frontera

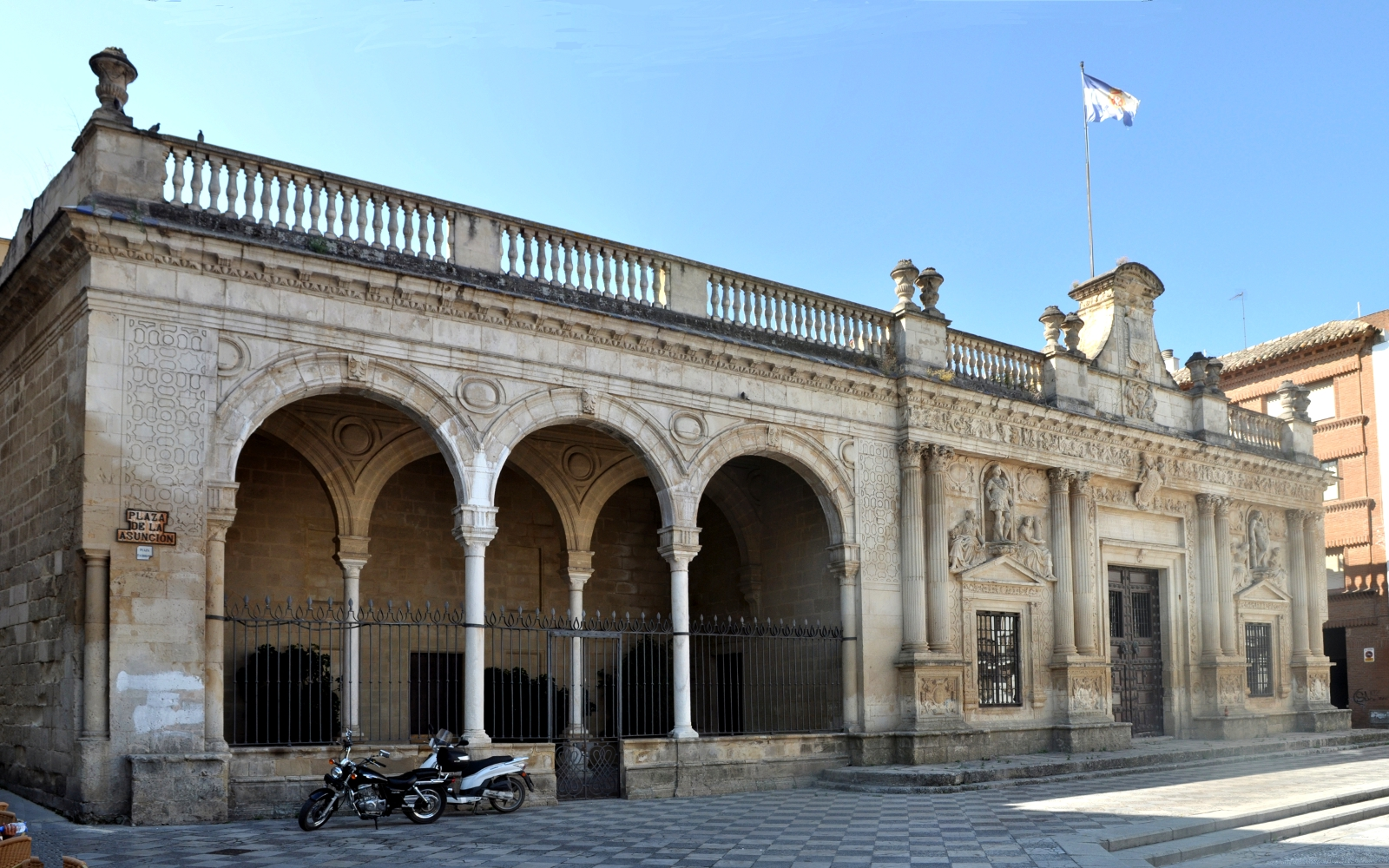
Old City Hall of Jerez de la Frontera

- Old City Hall of Jerez de la Frontera, built in 1575
- Alcazar of Jerez de la Frontera, a Moorish fortress, dating to the 11th century
- Zoo and Botanical Garden of Jerez.
- Villamarta Theatre
- Gallo Azul, built in 1927
- Walls of Jerez de la Frontera

=== Main factories ===
- González Byass
- Domecq
- Grupo Estévez
- Grupo Garvey
- Williams & Humbert
- Bodegas de Pilar Plá
- Bodegas Tradición
- Sánchez Romate
- Bodegas Lustau

=== Other sights ===
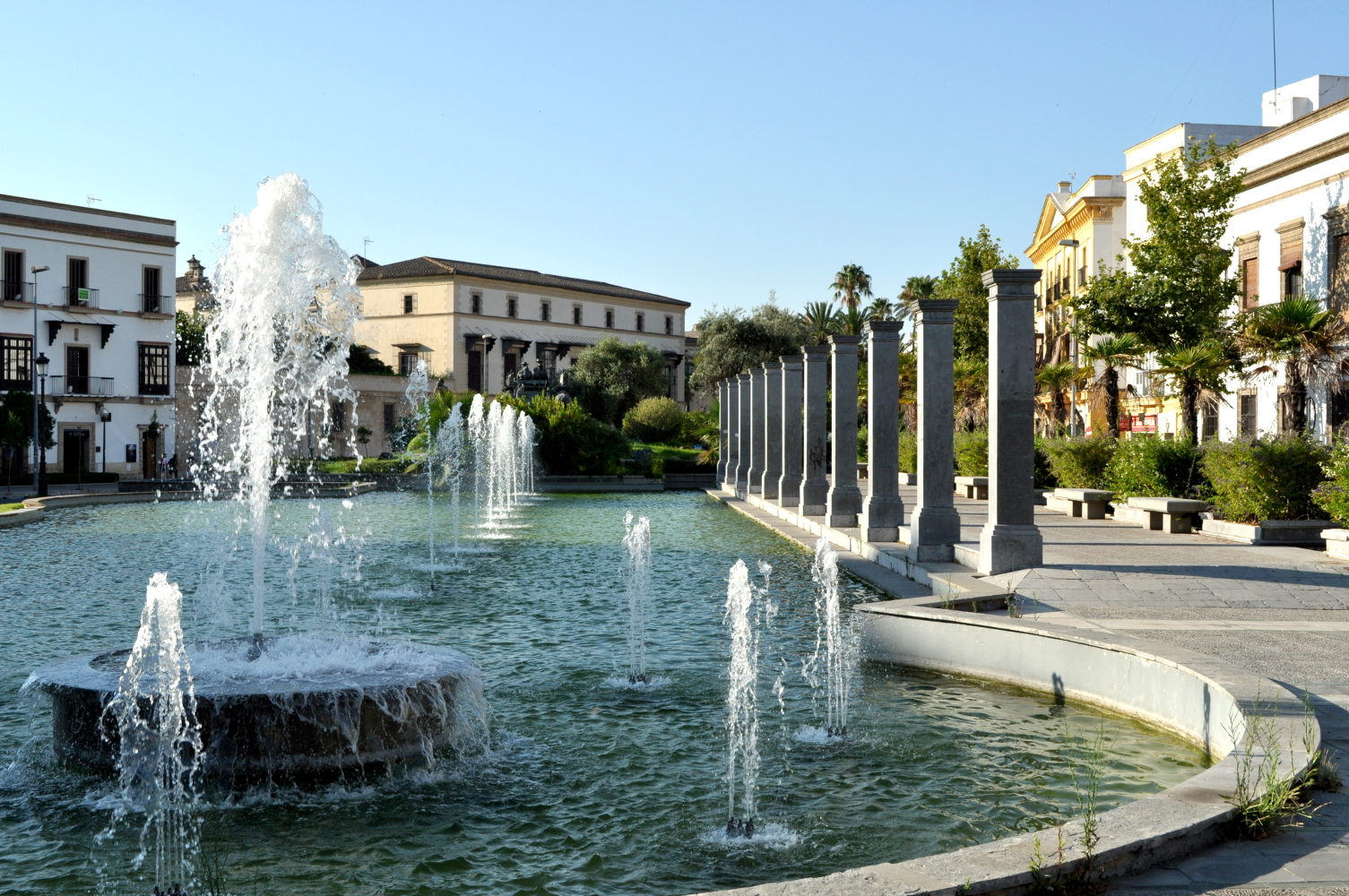
Mamelón Square

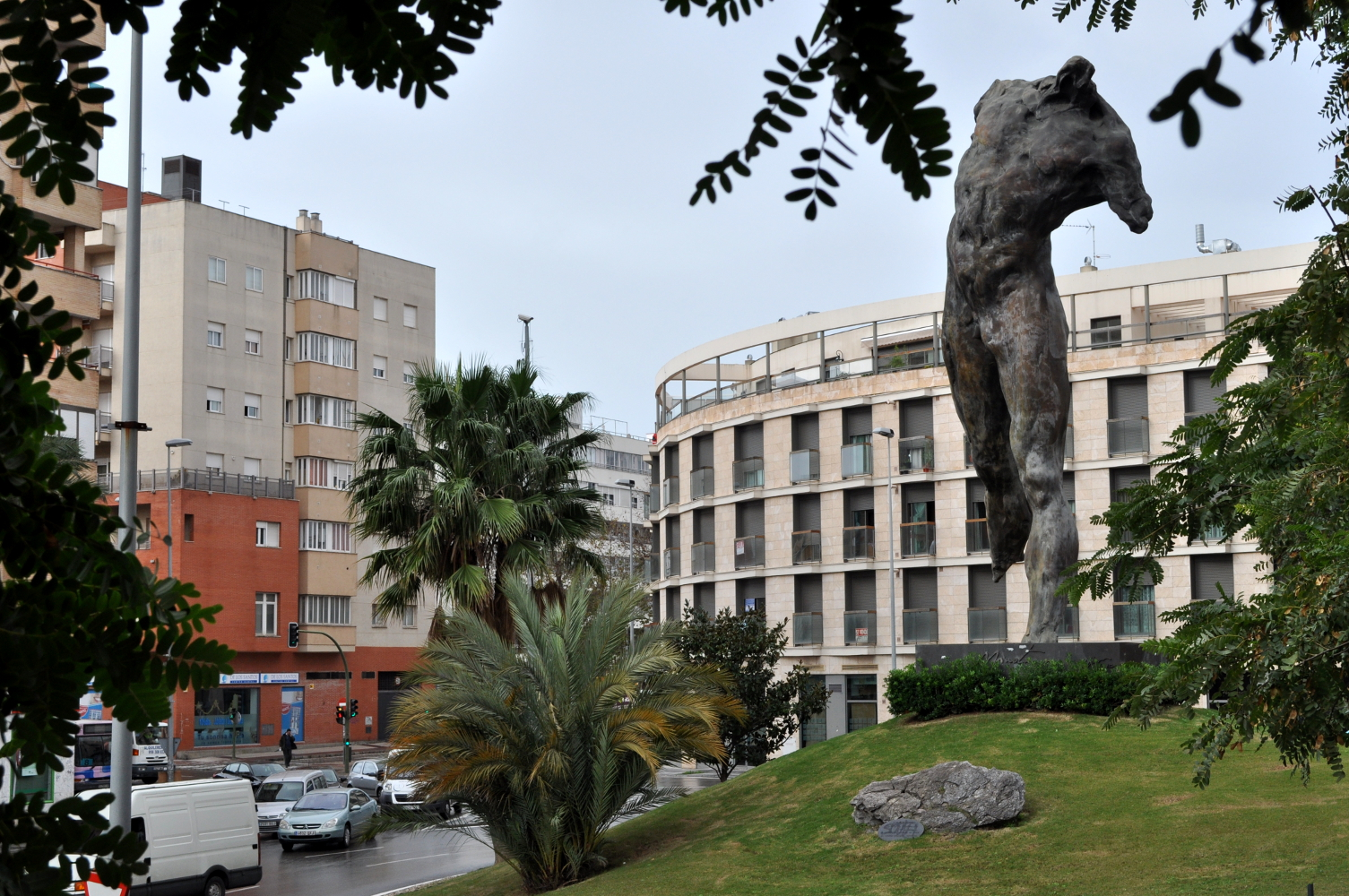
roundabout of Minotaur

- Crocodile Farm Kariba, unique in Spain.
- Circuito de Jerez
- Jerez Airport
- Fair Institution of Cádiz
- Estadio Municipal de Chapín
- Walk of Fame Jerez de la Frontera
- Military Stud of de Jerez de la Frontera
- Jerez Bullring
- Roundabout of Minotaur
- Playground "Children's City"
- Water Tower of Jerez
- Old Fish Shop
- Sala Compañía
- Centro Andaluz de Flamenco
- Zoco de Artesanía de Jerez
- Children's Traffic Park

== Culture ==
=== Wine ===
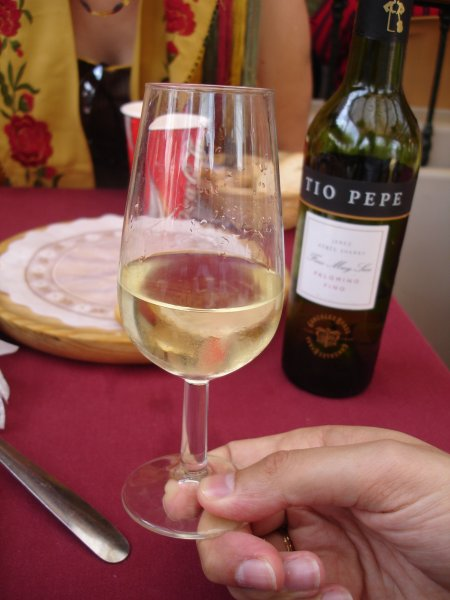
Sherry wine

Jerez is the world capital of sherry, a fortified wine made from white grapes grown near the city of Jerez. Jerez has been a centre of viniculture since the Phoenicians introduced winemaking to Spain in 1100 BC. The Romans continued the practice after they took control of Iberia around 200 BC. The Moors conquered the region in AD 711 and introduced distillation, which led to the development of brandy and fortified wine. Because sherry was a major wine export to the United Kingdom, British families founded many of the Jerez cellars. The city has many bodegas (wineries), many of which are of British origin. The most important include:

- González Byass: Manuel María González Angel founded this bodega in 1835, and his English agent, Robert Blake Byass subsequently joined in. The firm produces the fino sherry Tío Pepe.
- Williams & Humbert: This is a winery located in Jerez de la Frontera dedicated to the production of sherry wines and brandies and other liqueurs. Sir Alexander Williams and Arthur Humbert founded it in 1877.
- Grupo Garvey: founded in 1780 by William Garvey Power.
- Grupo Estévez: owns the Marqués del Real Tesoro and Valdespin bodegas. With origins dating from 1430, Valdespino is one of the oldest bodegas in the area.
- Domecq: is a winemaking company founded by Álvaro Domecq Díez's father.

Brandy de Jerez is a brandy exclusively produced within the "Sherry Triangle" (which is bounded by Jerez de la Frontera, El Puerto de Santa María and Sanlúcar de Barrameda, all in the province of Cádiz). Brandy de Jerez is used in Spanish cuisine, especially with meats.

=== Carthusian breed of horses ===
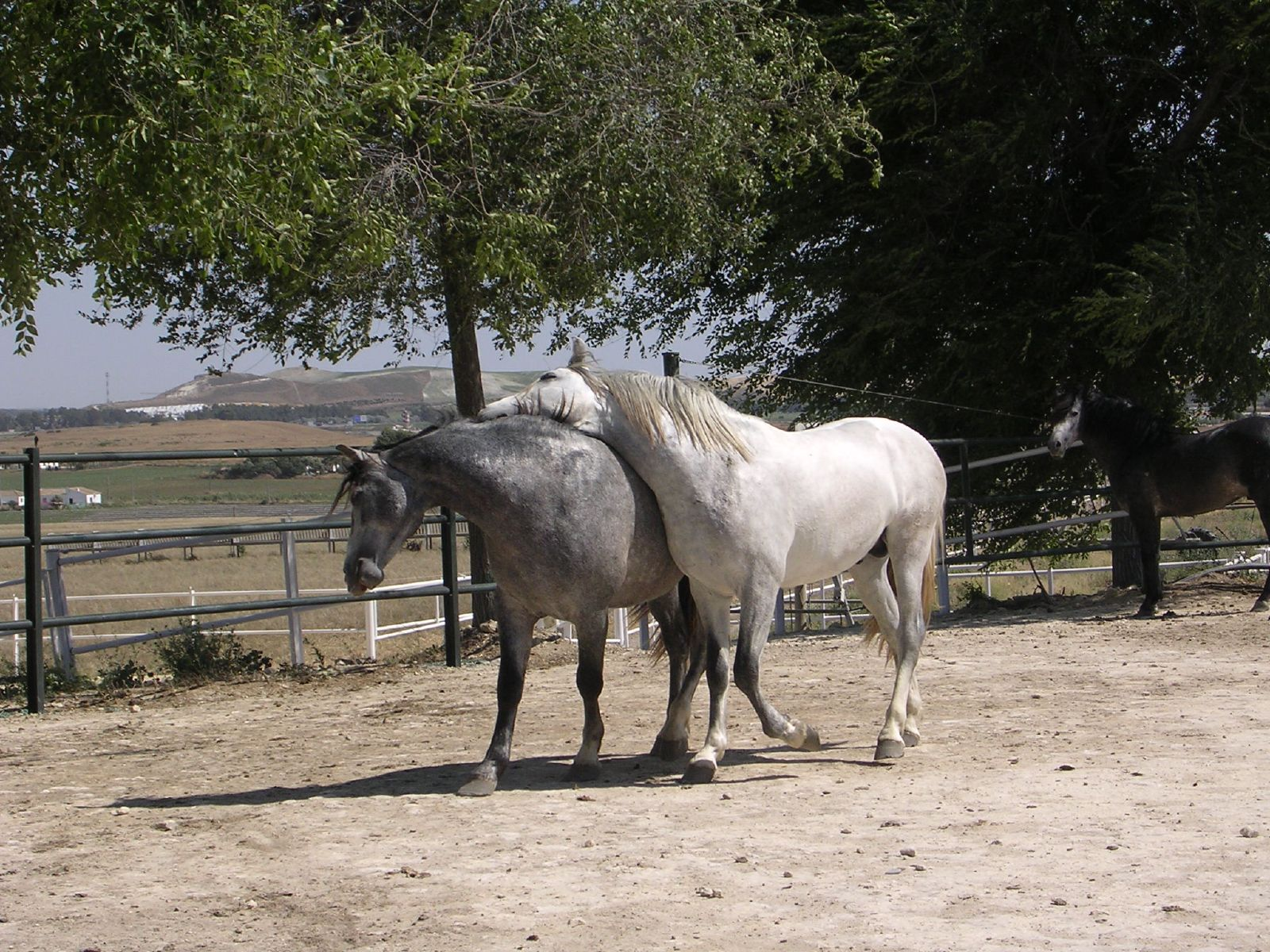
Carthusian horses

Jerez is the original home of the Carthusian sub-strain of the Andalusian horse breed, known as the Caballo cartujano in Spain. In the latter 1400s, the Carthusian monks began breeding horses on lands donated by Álvaro Obertos de Valeto for construction of the Charterhouse of Jerez de la Frontera (la Cartuja de Jerez de la Frontera). When the Spanish Crown decreed that Spanish horse breeders should breed their Andalusian stock with Neapolitan and central European stock, the monks refused to comply, and continued to select their best specimens to develop their own jealously guarded bloodline for almost four hundred years.

Jerez is the home of the Royal Andalusian School of Equestrian Art, a riding school comparable to the famous Spanish Riding School of Vienna.

Another famous equine institution headquartered in Jerez is the Yeguada Militar de Jerez de la Frontera (known outside Spain as the Yeguada Militar), the Spanish military stud farm dedicated to the breeding of purebred Andalusian and Arabian horses. Founded in 1847, it became the official stud farm of the Spanish military in 1893.

The 2002 FEI World Equestrian Games were held in Jerez at the Estadio Municipal de Chapín, which was remodeled for the event, from September 10 to September 22, 2002. This was the 4th edition of the games, which are held every four years and run by the FEI.

=== Flamenco ===
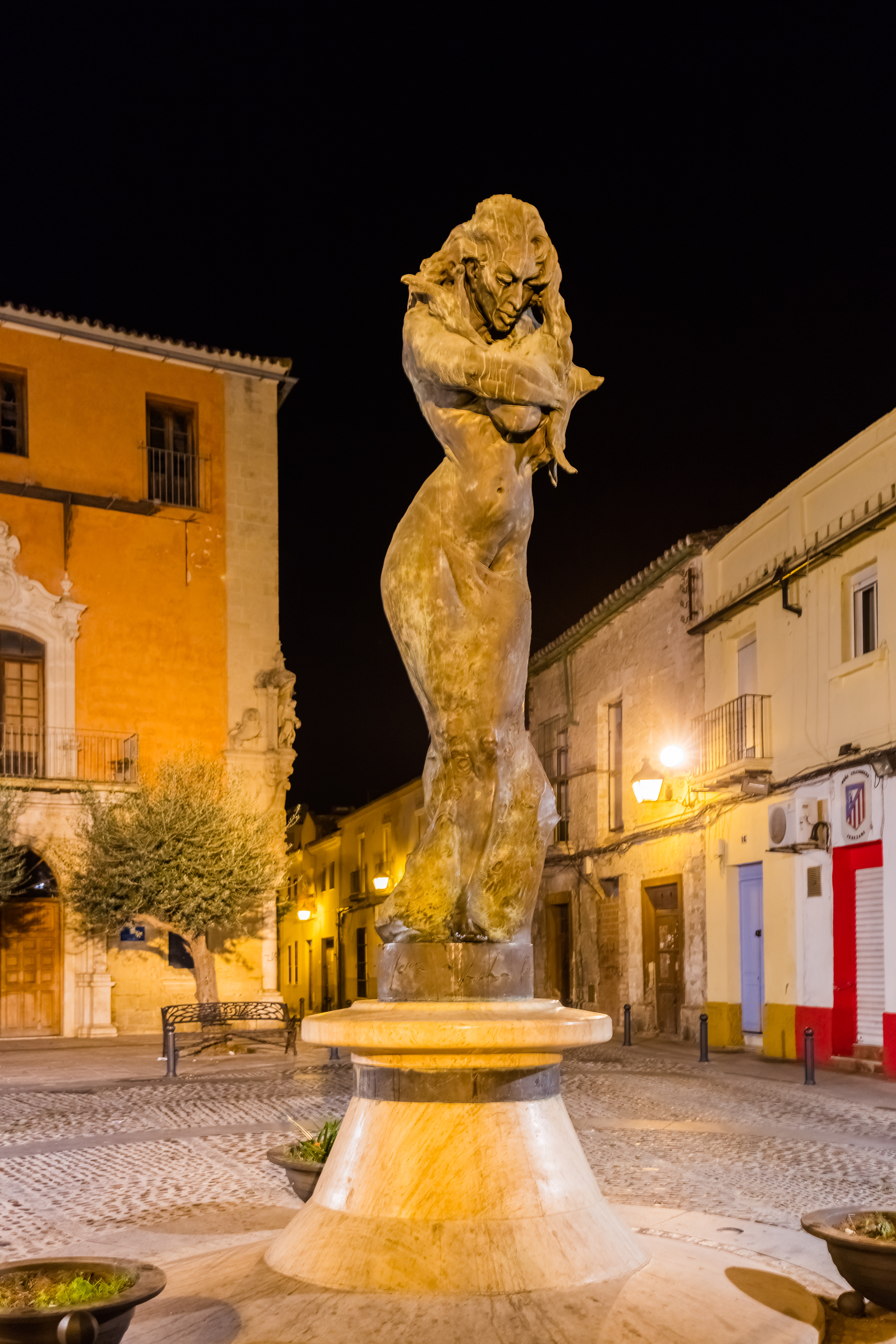
Monument to Lola Flores in Jerez de la Frontera

Jerez is proud of its Andalusian Centre of Flamenco, which was founded in 1993 to safeguard and promote the values and standards of flamenco. It is devoted to the investigation, recovery, and collection of flamenco-related historical documents, whether they are in audio, visual, or journalistic form. It also has a collection of flamenco artifacts, including musical instruments, costumes, promotional posters, sheet music, and postcards. The centre operates a museum and library to help educate the public and serve as a resource for scholars. Many of the most famous personalities of the city are or were involved in the performance of flamenco, including La Paquera de Jerez, Lola Flores and José Mercé.

=== Festivals ===
==== Grand Prix ====
Since 1987 the Grand Prix motorcycle racing has been held at the Circuito de Jerez in early May. Thousands of motorbikers from around the world come to the city this week to watch the MotoGP race held in Jerez annually. The race is one of the most watched races in Europe.

==== Feria del Caballo ====
Another popular festival is the Feria del Caballo (declared a festival of international tourist interest), one of the most famous Spanish fairs, and the most important fair in the province of Cádiz. It is celebrated annually in the Parque González Hontoria for one week in May, occurring always after the Spanish motorcycle Grand Prix. The a fair dedicated mainly to the horse. All booths (casetas) at the fair are open to the public, so that attendees may walk into any one of them and enjoy the food, drinks, and dancing. This is one of the main features that differentiates the Feria de Jerez from the rest of the Andalusian Fairs, such as the Seville Fair, where most of the casetas are private and only card-holding members are allowed in.

==== Holy Week ====
Holy Week in Jerez, as in other cities in Andalusia, commemorates the Passion of Jesus Christ. It is celebrated by Catholic religious brotherhoods and fraternities that perform penance processions on the streets during the last week of Lent, the week immediately before Easter. The Holy Week of Jerez de la Frontera stands out for being one of the most important in Andalusia in terms of number of brotherhoods, quality in its carvings and iconographic sets. Holy Week in Jerez was declared of National Tourist Interest in 1993.

==== Christmas ====
During the Christmas season, from the end of November to the end of December, many peñas (religious and cultural clubs) celebrate the holidays with public festivals where anyone can go to drink, eat, dance and sing Christmas carols, accompanied by friction drums called zambombas.

==== Other Festivals ====
- Flamenco festival de Jerez
- Carnival of Jerez
- Fiestas de la Vendimia (Declared a festival of international tourist interest)

=== Other institutions ===
The old quarter of Jerez, dating from medieval times, has been named an "Artistic Historic Complex". The Easter week celebrations in Jerez are of "National Touristic Interest", and its remarkable Feria del Caballo in May is an event of "International Touristic Interest".

The Andalusian Flamenco Centre is located in the Pemartín Palace (Palacio de Pemartín) and offers a library, displays, video films and live demonstrations of the art of flamenco dancing.

== Sport ==
=== Circuito de Jerez ===
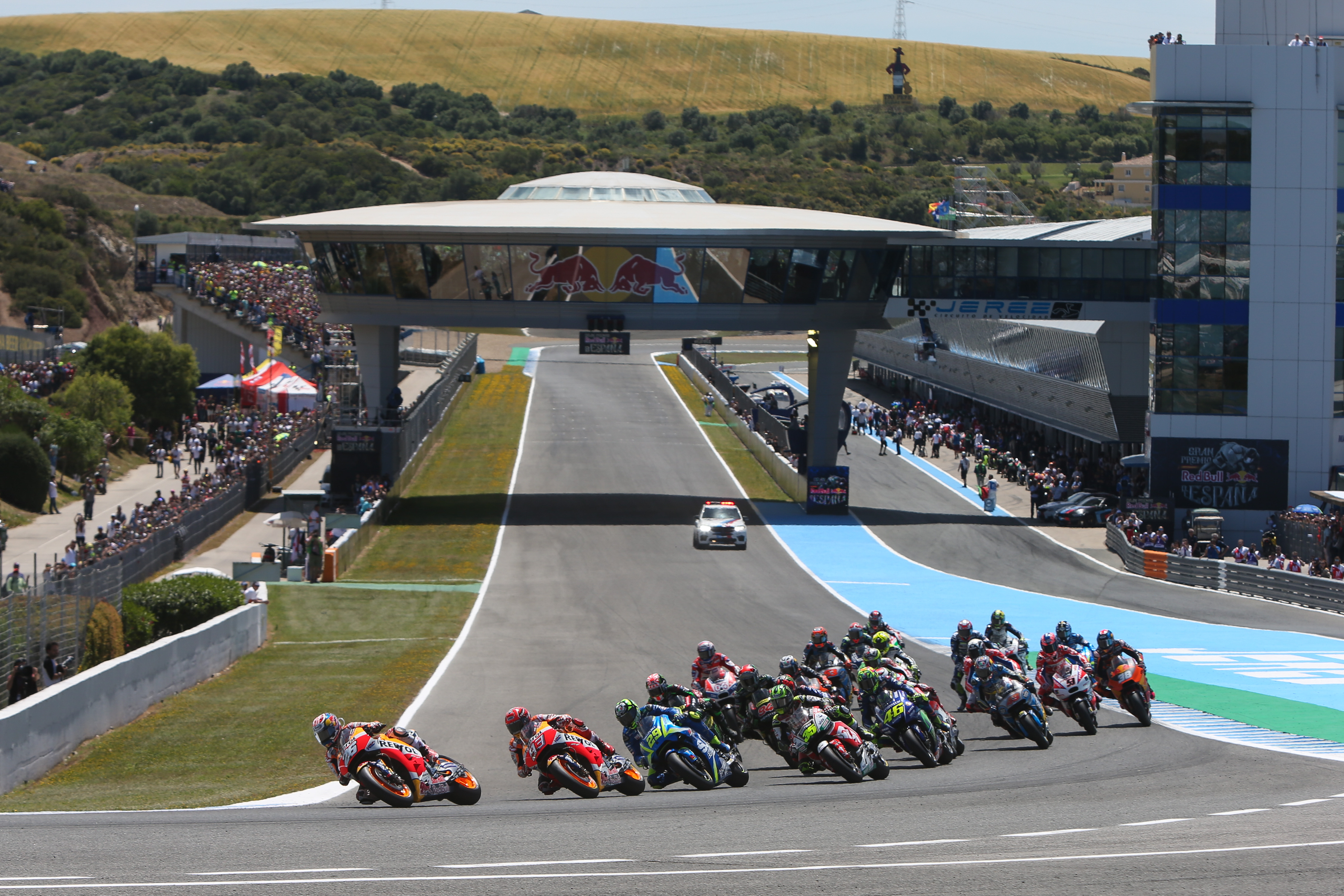
The Circuito de Jerez during the 2017 Spanish motorcycle Grand Prix.

The city of Jerez is the first motorcycling world capital. It is the site of Circuito de Jerez, formerly called the Circuito Permanente de Jerez, where the annual MotoGP Spanish Motorcycle Grand Prix is contested.

The race course is also a prime destination for Formula One teams wishing to perform off-season testing. In the past it has hosted the F1 race itself, namely the Spanish Grand Prix between 1986 and 1990, before the race moved permanently to the Catalunya Circuit near Barcelona. Since then Jerez has hosted Formula One races a few times, with the designation of the European Grand Prix in 1994 and the race in 1997 which decided the 1997 Formula One World Championship.

=== Complejo Municipal de Chapín ===
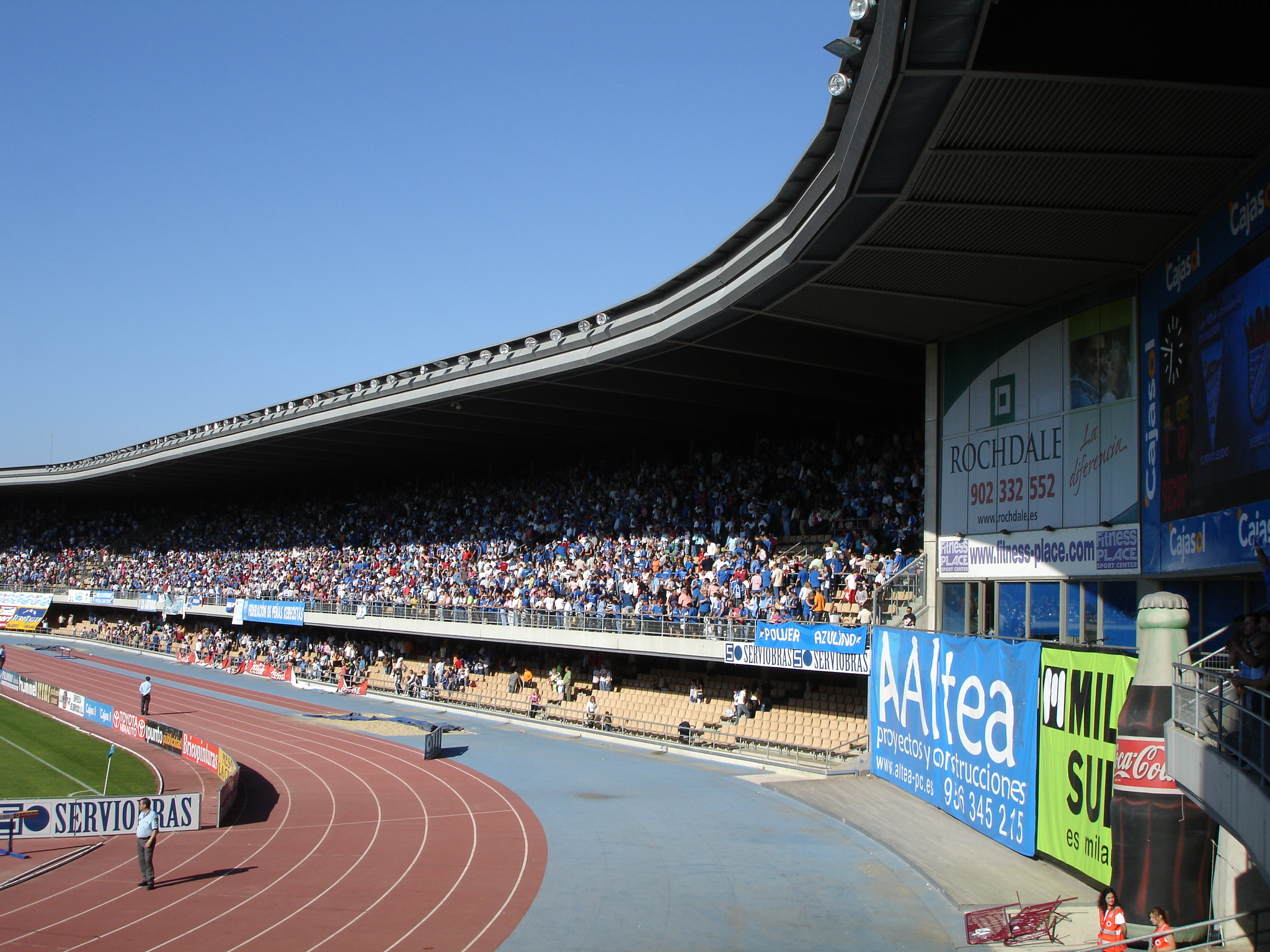
Estadio Municipal de Chapín

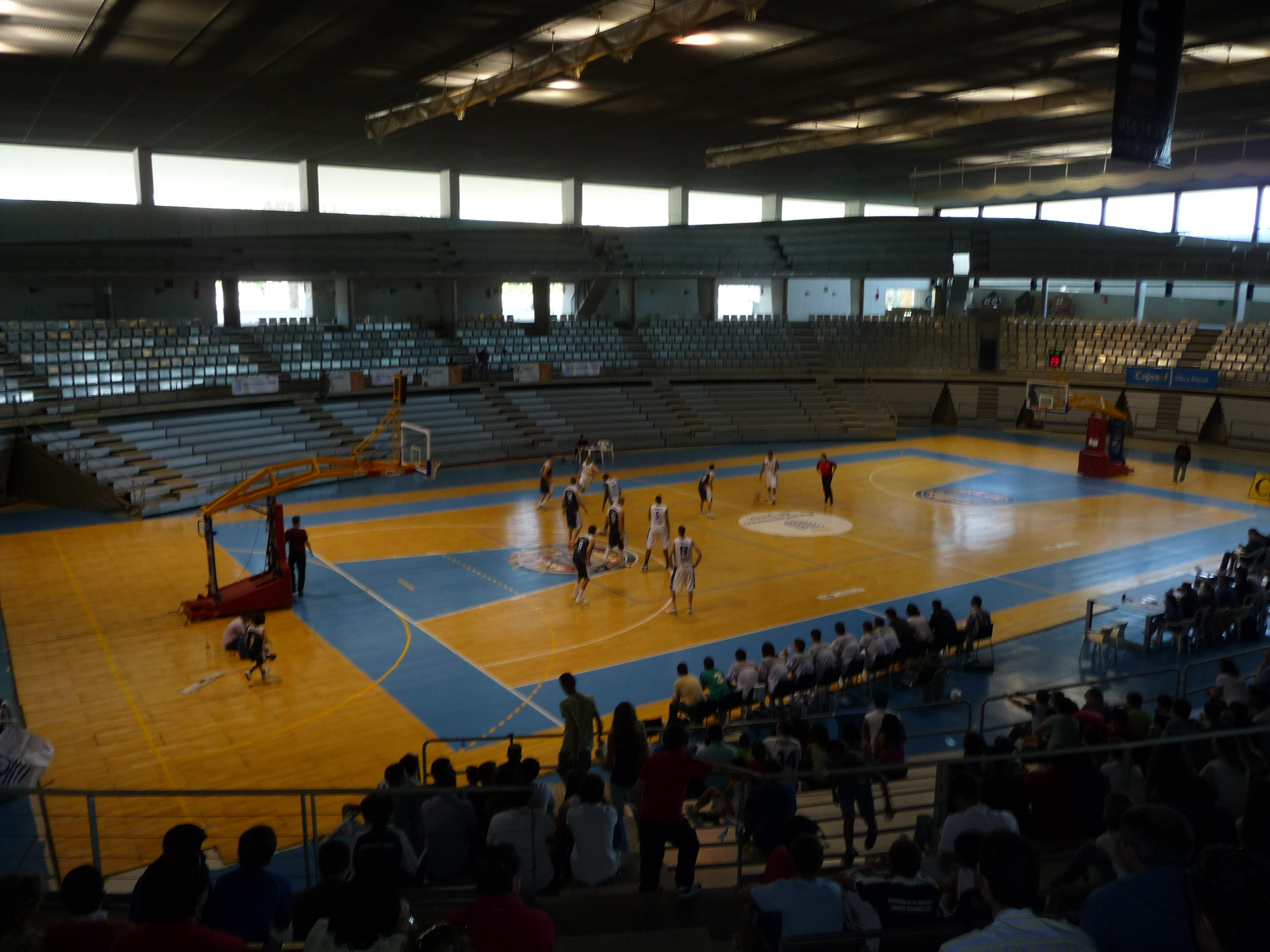
Palacio de Deportes de Chapín

The Complejo Municipal de Chapín is a complex of sports facilities that includes a football stadium and field, a baseball field, equestrian facilities and a Sports Hall, as well as a futsal field and basketball and volleyball courts.

The Estadio Municipal de Chapín, a multi-purpose stadium, was built in 1988 and seats 20,523 spectators. In 2002 the stadium was remodeled to hold the 2002 FEI World Equestrian Games. The whole grandstand was covered with a roof, and a hotel and spa-gym were added. It was historically the home of Xerez CD, the city's club founded in 1947 and known simply as Xerez, which played in the top division in the 2009–2010 season. From 2014 to 2021, the stadium was the home of Xerez Deportivo FC, founded in 2013 to replace the old Xerez club. Since 2021, both Xerez Deportivo and Xerez CD have both occupied the Municipal, with both clubs currently playing in the Segunda Federación as of January 2026.

The stadium, which has a running track, was designated as an Olympic Stadium. The most important track team training there is the Club Atletismo Xerez Deportivo FC, which won the Spanish championships in 2001–2007.

Canasta Unibasket Jerez and DKV Jerez are the city's basketball teams; they play in Palacio Municipal de Deportes de Chapín.

Venenciadores de Jerez, the city's baseball team, is currently without a home field and awaits completion of one in the Complejo Municipal de Chapín.

The main futsal team in Jerez is Xerez Deportivo FC (also known as Xerez Toyota Nimauto for sponsorship reasons). It was founded in 2014 and currently plays in the Ruiz Mateos Sports Center and the Palacio Municipal de Deportes de Chapín in Segunda Andaluza.

The most important rugby club is Club Rugby Xerez, which trains at the Pradera Hípica in Chapín.

=== Domecq Stadium ===
The Domecq Stadium was the first football stadium in Jerez de la Frontera. It was the home of Xerez CD and Jerez Industrial CF before its demolition. The Stadium del Parque (Park Stadium) was built in 1923 and remodeled (with the name of Domecq Stadium) in 1932 by the architect Francisco Hernández Rubio. It held 20,523 and it was demolished in 1988.

=== Juventud Stadium ===
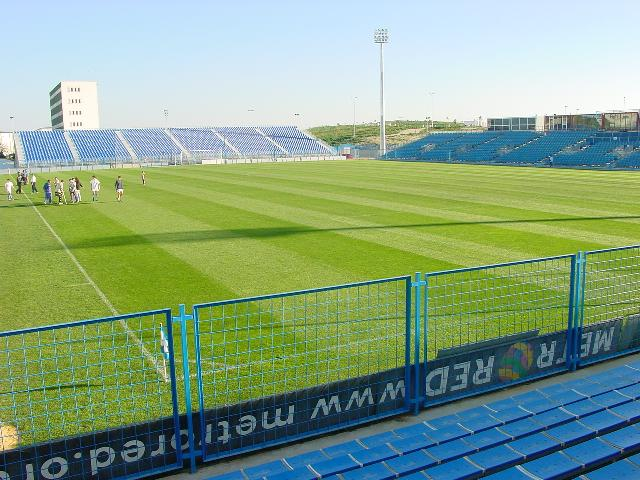
Juventud Stadium

Currently, the Juventud Stadium is the oldest stadium in the city. It holds 5,000 and is the home of Jerez Industrial CF, founded in 1951, the main rival of Xerez.

Formerly, the football field belonged to the youth hostel which is located in the vicinity thereof, hence its name.

=== Antonio Fernández Marchán Stadium ===
It is the CD Guadalcacín stadium, which plays in the Tercera Division. It is placed in Guadalcacín, a neighborhood northern Jerez.

=== Other sports complexes ===
- Complejo Deportivo de La Granja
- Campo de fútbol de La Canaleja
- Campo de Fútbol Manuel Millán
- Campo de fútbol Juan Fernández Simón
- Campo de fútbol de Picadueña
- Polideportivo Ruiz-Mateos

=== Other sports ===
The 2014 Vuelta a España cycle race began in Jerez de la Frontera on 23 August, with a 12.6 km (7.8 mi) team time trial. The race followed a 21-stage route, finishing in Santiago de Compostela on 14 September.

Club Natación Jerez, is the main Swimming Club in Jerez. It has won the "Campeonato de España Master" ("Championship of Spain Master") many times.

== Education ==
There are 76 elementary schools, 41 secondary schools, 12 adult education centres and 10 public libraries in the city of Jerez.

=== University of Cádiz ===
The University of Cádiz, the provincial university, has a campus in Jerez. It specializes in socio-political studies.

The city is also home to a member of the Official School of Languages (Escuela Oficial de Idiomas) and a centre of the National Distance Education University (Universidad Nacional de Educación a Distancia, UNED).

== Transportation ==
=== Airport ===
Jerez Airport, also known as Aeropuerto de La Parra, is the main airport in the province of Cádiz. It is located 8 km (5 mi) north of the city centre and is connected to the city by train and bus.

It was built in 1937, during the Spanish Civil War by the Nationalists in order to transport soldiers from Africa to Spain. The airport was open to civil traffic in 1992. It is the third most important airport in Andalucia after Malaga and Seville.

=== Train ===
Jerez has had a railway line since 1854, which was one of the first in Spain, the Alcázar de San Juan–Cádiz railway. The line went between Jerez and El Puerto de Santa María and transported wine barrels for export. Jerez de la Frontera railway station is used by more passengers than Cádiz and is the fourth busiest in Andalucia.

Next to the Aeropuerto de Jerez, there is a new train station which connects the airport through the Cercanías Cádiz line C-1 to nearby Jerez, and also to Cádiz, Sevilla, Lebrija, Utrera, El Puerto de Santa María, and San Fernando.

=== Bus ===
The city of Jerez has 16 bus lines:

- L 1 Esteve-San Telmo-Constitución
- L 2 Esteve-Picadueñas
- L 3 Esteve-La Plata-Mosto-San Juan de Dios
- L 4 Esteve-García Lorca-El Altillo
- L 5 Esteve-Campus-Guadalcacín
- L 6 Esteve-Campus-La Granja
- L 7 Angustias-La Pita-Estella del Marqués
- L 8 Circunvalación I
- L 9 Circunvalación II
- L 10 Canaleja-Atlántico-Esteve-Hacienda-Hospital
- L 12 Alcázar-C. Salud San Telmo-El Portal/Guadabajaque
- L 13 Alcázar-Blas Infante-Asisa
- L 14 Esteve-Villas Este-La Marquesa
- L 16 Casinos-Hipercor-Ortega Y Gasset
- L 19 Nueva Jarilla-Guadalcacín-Angustias
- L 20 Rotonda-García Lorca-Guadalcacín

=== Intercity buses ===
From Jerez are made regular trips to the following towns:

- Alcalá del Valle
- Algeciras
- Barbate
- Cádiz
- Chiclana de la Frontera
- Chipiona
- El Puerto de Santa María
- Los Barrios
- Madrid
- Málaga
- Medina-Sidonia
- Ronda
- Rota
- San José del Valle
- San Fernando
- Sanlúcar de Barrameda
- Sevilla
- Trebujena
- Zahara de los Atunes

=== Roads ===
Identifier	Itinerary	Observations
A-4 E-5	Madrid - Córdoba - Seville - Dos Hermanas - Jerez - El Puerto de Santa María - Puerto Real - Cádiz	Connects Jerez and the Province of Cádiz to Province of Seville
AP-4 E-5	Seville - Jerez - Cádiz	Connects Jerez and the Province of Cádiz to Province of Seville
A-381	Jerez - Medina Sidonia - Alcalá de los Gazules - Los Barrios	Connects Jerez to the Janda and the Campo de Gibraltar
A-382	Jerez - Jédula - Arcos de la Frontera	Connects Jerez to the Sierra de Cádiz
A-480	Chipiona - Sanlúcar de Barrameda - Jerez	Connects Bajo Guadalquivir to Jerez

=== Bicycle ===
Jerez has 41 km (25 mi) of bike lanes that follow the main avenues of the city.

== Demographics ==
According to official population data from INE, the municipality of Jerez had 213,105 inhabitants as of January 1, 2020. This makes Jerez the most populous city in the province, fifth in Andalusia, and 25th in Spain.

=== Growth ===
Growth of the population of Jerez de la Frontera from 1842

Fuente: INE

=== Population distribution ===
Population centre names	Kind	Population 2012	Distance from city centre
Cuartillos	Rural neighbourhood	1,300 inhabitants	11 km (6.8 mi) east
El Mojo-Baldío de Gallardo	Rural neighbourhood	400 inhabitants	16 km (9.9 mi) southeast
El Portal	Rural neighbourhood	700 inhabitants	6 km (3.7 mi) south
Estella del Marqués	Village	1,650 inhabitants	5.5 km (3.4 mi) east
El Torno	Village	1,300 inhabitants	20 km (12 mi) east
Gibalbín	Rural neighbourhood	550 inhabitants	30 km (19 mi) northeast
Guadalcacín	Village	5,500 inhabitants	5 km (3.1 mi) northeast
Jerez de la Frontera (city)	City	190,000 inhabitants	
La Barca de la Florida	Village	4,353 inhabitants	20 km (12 mi) east
La Corta	Rural neighbourhood	550 inhabitants	3.8 km (2.4 mi) south
La Ina	Rural neighbourhood	800 inhabitants	10 km (6.2 mi) southeast
Las Pachecas	Rural neighbourhood	430 inhabitants	8 km (5.0 mi) southeast
Las Tablas, Polila y Añina	Rural neighbourhood	400 inhabitants	6 km (3.7 mi) west
Lomopardo	Rural neighbourhood	283 inhabitants	5 km (3.1 mi) southeast
Los Albarizones	Rural neighbourhood	420 inhabitants	3.5 km (2.2 mi) southeast
Majarromaque	Rural neighbourhood	500 inhabitants	26 km (16 mi) east
Mesas de Asta	Rural neighbourhood	600 inhabitants	11 km (6.8 mi) east
Mesas de Santa Rosa	Rural neighbourhood	300 inhabitants	5 km (3.1 mi) north
Nueva Jarilla	Village	1,600 inhabitants	15 km (9.3 mi) northeast
Puente de la Guareña	Rural neighbourhood	500 inhabitants	16 km (9.9 mi) east
Rajamancera	Rural neighbourhood	485 inhabitants	8 km (5.0 mi) southeast
San Isidro del Guadalete	Village	650 inhabitants	15 km (9.3 mi) southeast
Torrecera	Village	1,280 inhabitants	20 km (12 mi) southeast
Torremelgarejo	Rural neighbourhood	730 inhabitants	10 km (6.2 mi) east

=== Immigration ===
Immigrant Population in Jerez (2011)
Country / Area	Men	Women	Total	% Pop.
European Union	929	913	1842	0,87%
Germany	109	107	216	0,10%
Portugal	60	61	121	0,06%
France	103	124	227	0,11%
Italy	124	95	219	0,10%
United Kingdom	193	135	328	0,15%
Romania	196	227	423	0,20%
Non-EU Countries	71	187	258	0,12%
Russia	7	61	68	0,03%
Ukraine	29	91	120	0,06%
AFRICA	608	380	988	0,46%
Morocco	335	244	579	0,27%
AMERICAS	841	1344	2185	1,03%
Argentina	67	92	159	0,07%
Bolivia	225	396	621	0,29%
Colombia	116	196	312	0,15%
Ecuador	57	73	130	0,06%
Peru	38	49	87	0,04%
ASIA	165	160	325	0,15%
China	126	112	238	0,11%
OTHERS	2	0	2	0,001%
TOTAL	2606	2975	5581	2,62%

== People ==
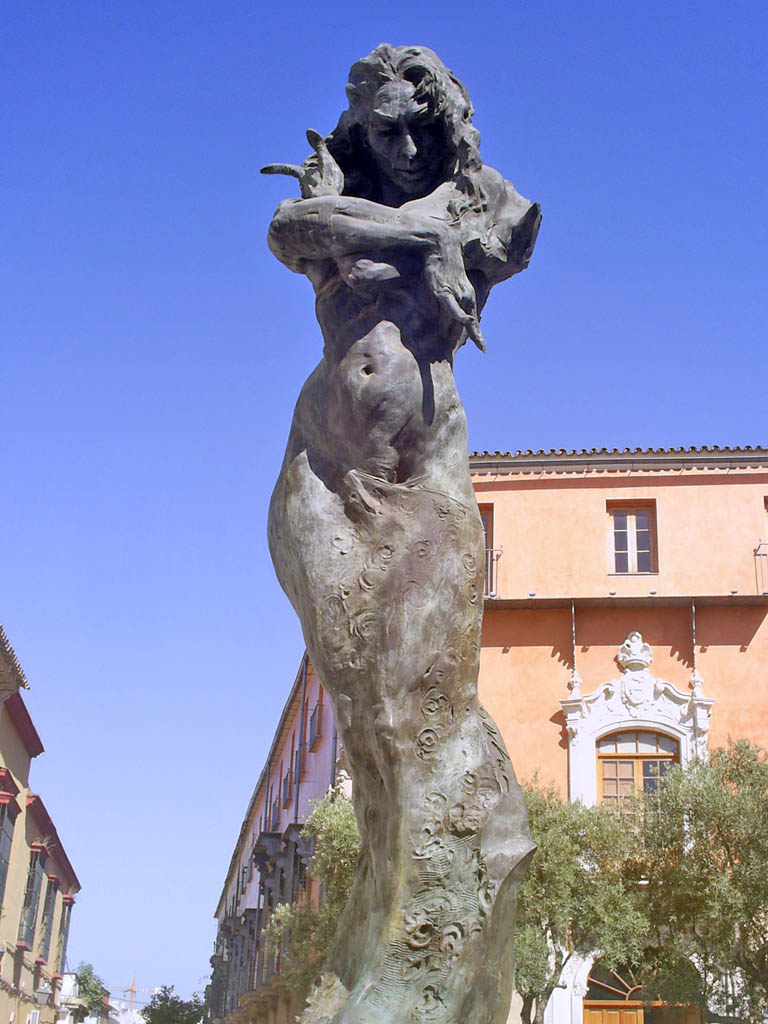
Lola Flores monument

- Dolores Agujetas
- Manuel Alejandro
- Mercedes Chilla
- Daniel Güiza
- Kiko
- Lola Flores
- José Mercé
- Álvar Núñez Cabeza de Vaca
- Gerardo Núñez
- Juan José Palomino Jiménez
- La Paquera de Jerez
- Miguel Primo de Rivera
- Mala Rodriguez
- Luis Coloma, creator of Ratoncito Pérez
- José Manuel Caballero Bonald
- Juan José Padilla
- Rafael de Paula
- Pilar Paz Pasamar
- Carlos González Ragel

== International relations ==
=== Twin towns – Sister cities ===
Jerez de la Frontera is twinned with:

- Arles, France (29 July 1980)
- Tequila, Mexico (27 April 1982)
- Bristol, United Kingdom (2 December 1986)
- Cognac, France (16 September 1989)
- Kiyosu, Japan (19 January 1994)
- Biarritz, France (21 March 1997)
- Ciudad Juárez, Mexico (30 January 1998)
- Foz do Iguaçu, Brazil (30 January 1998)
- Zacatecas, Mexico (28 June 2005)
- Pisco, Peru (29 November 2005)
- Moquegua, Peru (29 November 2005)
- El Paso, United States

== See also ==
- List of mayors of Jerez de la Frontera
- Monument to Primo de Rivera (Jerez)
- List of municipalities in Cádiz

== Bibliography ==
- Izco Reina, Manuel Jesús (2003). "Las comunidades extranjeras y la posesión de esclavos en el Jerez de la Frontera del siglo XVI" (PDF). I Coloquio Internacional "Los Extranjeros en la España Moderna". Vol. 1. Universidad de Málaga. pp. 391–399. ISBN 84-688-2633-2.
- Aladro Prieto, José Manuel; Mosquera Adell, Eduardo (2018). "La imagen industrial de la ciudad. Jerez de la Frontera siglo XIX" (PDF). EGA. Revista de Expresión Gráfica Arquitectónica. 23 (32). Valencia: Universitat Politècnica de València: 254–261. doi:10.4995/ega.2018.9815. ISSN 1133-6137.
