= Convento de San José (Jerez de la Frontera) =

Convent in Andalusia, Spain

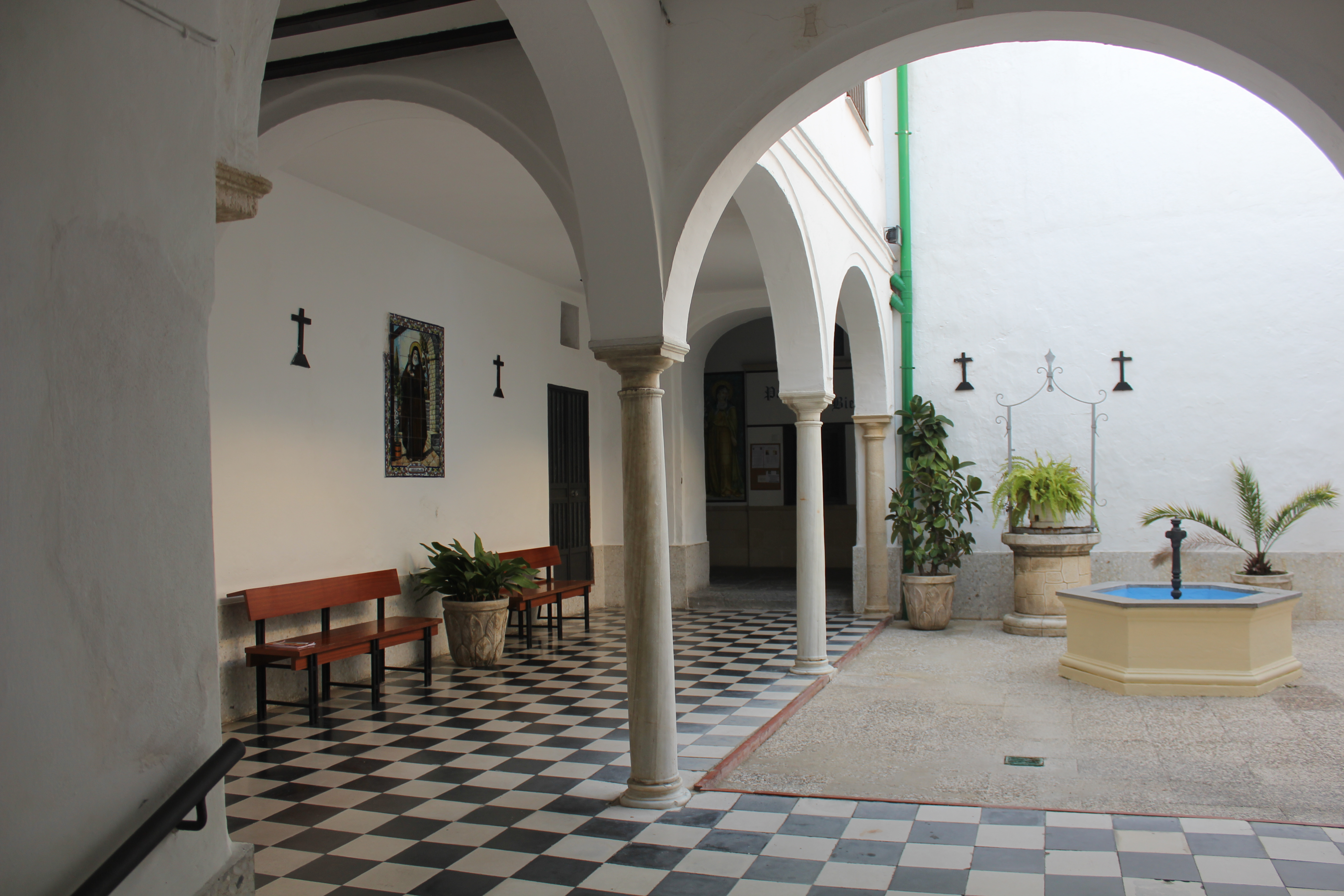
Interior courtyard

Convento de San José (Convent of St Joseph) is located in Jerez de la Frontera, Andalusia, Spain. It is governed by the Franciscan Poor Clares. The structure's interior has a courtyard and a church building dating to 1628. In the 1970s, the dormitory was replaced with single rooms.
