= Plaza de toros de San Fernando, Cádiz =

Coordinates: 36°28′0″N 6°11′33″W

Plaza de toros de San Fernando is a bullfighting ring located in San Fernando in the Province of Cádiz, Andalusia, Spain. It was established in 1871, and is located near the Edificio de Capitanía General de San Fernando, the Museo Histórico Municipal de San Fernando and the Castillo de San Romualdo. It seats around 8000 spectators.
