= Iglesia Mayor de San Pedro y San Pablo =

Church building in San Fernando, Spain

Coordinates: 36°27′57″N 6°11′47″W

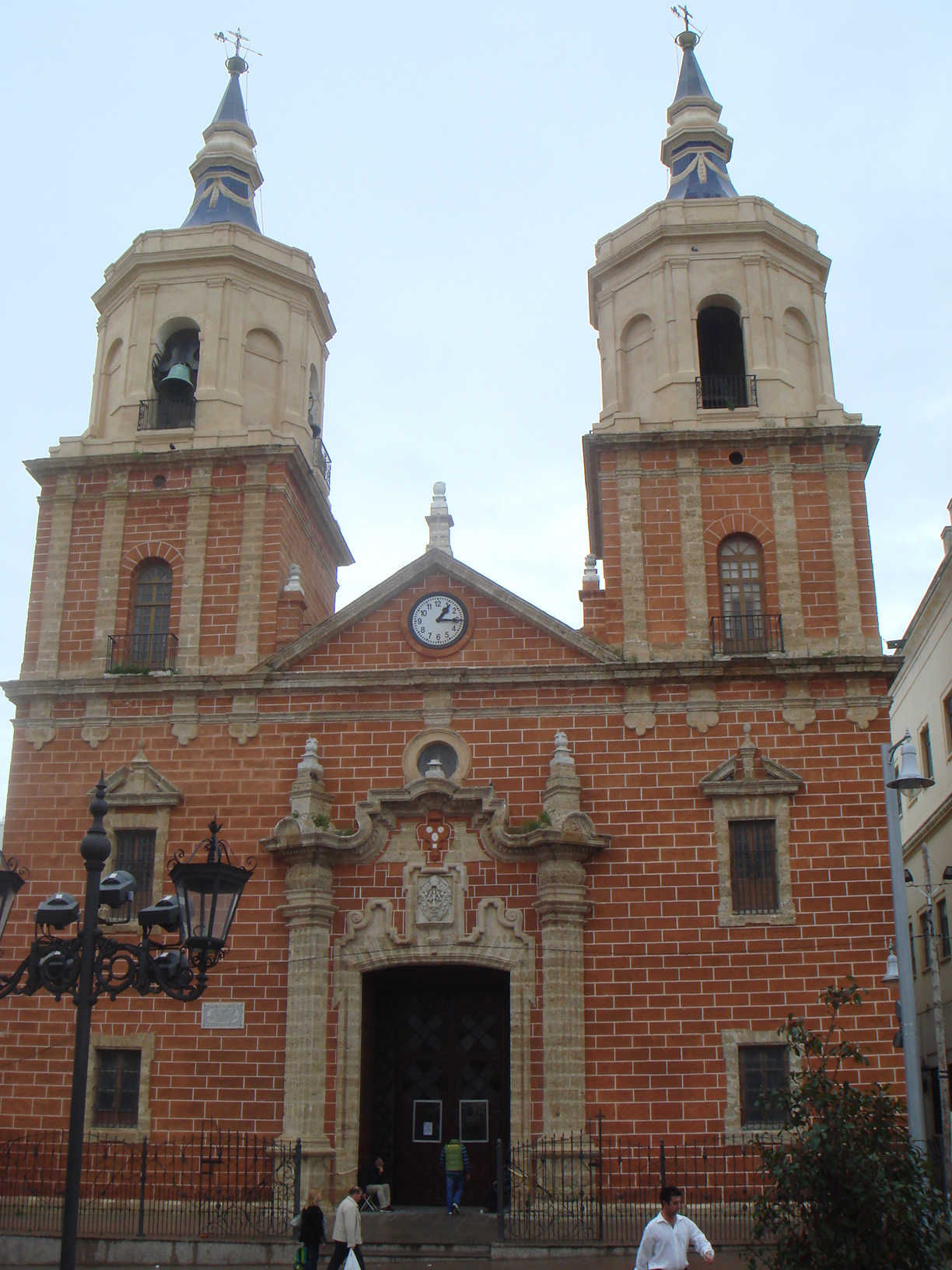
Main Church of St Peter and St Paul

Iglesia Mayor de San Pedro y San Pablo (translated, "Main Church of St Peter and St Paul"; officially, Church of St. Peter and St. Paul and the Grievance; popularly known as, "Main Church") is a church located in San Fernando in the Province of Cádiz, Andalusia, Spain. It is located in the heart of the city along the Calle Real.

== Geography ==
The church is located in the center of San Fernando, opposite the Church Square. It is near the Salt and Sea Hotel, the Museo Histórico Municipal de San Fernando, the town hall, and the bullfighting ring. Located at the very centre of the town, on the left of the road to Cádiz, with San Romualdo Castle and the Suazo Bridge are to the north, and the Carmen Convent is to the south.

== History ==
Construction of the church began in 1756, replacing the small parish church of Santa María del Castillo de San Romualdo. It was consecrated in 1764 but was not completed until the early 19th century. Its primitive design is attributed to Alejandro Perdia although Torcuato Benjumeda is credited with its final appearance. It was built to satisfy the needs of San Fernando's growing population. Financing for its construction was raised by a tax on wine. Legend states, however, that an Englishman saw the unfinished state of the church and donated a large sum of money in spite of belonging to the Anglican Church himself. Its historical value is important, as it was here that deputies of the first Spanish Constituent Assembly were sworn in on September 24, 1810. A series of small offices within the building were historically used as meeting places for some guilds.

Today the town celebrates The Festival of the Patron Saints (San Servando and San Germán) on a Sunday near to the 23 October and during Easter Week (Semana Santa) there are over twenty processions for which the town prepares throughout the year.

== Architecture ==
Two architectural styles predominate the rectangular building: Late Baroque, especially the ornamental decorations around the various doors, and Neoclassicism in the upper sections of the towers topping the facade. Four bells which bear the names of the four Evangelists are situated in its two towers. The facade includes a flat bay with slightly arched lintel. The central nave is flanked by two aisles and there is a transept and a vestry which is at a slightly higher level than the rest of the church. The floor is of marble and there is an oyster stone plinth. The sacristy is behind the chancel. A hemispherical dome crowns the transept with ribbed vaults at the same height as the roof of the nave. Tuscan pillars supporting curved arches separate the aisles from the central nave.

== Fittings ==
During restoration work in 1959, the main altar was adorned with paintings of Christ crucified with St Peter and St Paul on either side. The baptismal chapel in the first section of the nave is decorated with murals of the four Evangelists, dating to 1959. Other paintings in the church include Nuestra Señora del Rosario and San Miguel. Other various works of art include Holy Week processions in the city. The crypt, known as the cellar, contains the tombs of monks.

== See also ==
- List of Bien de Interés Cultural in the Province of Cádiz
