= San Fernando Naval Museum =

Naval museum in San Fernando, Spain

Museo Naval de San Fernando
- Museo Naval de San Fernando
- Location: Capitanía General de San Fernando, San Fernando, Spain
- Website: Official website

The San Fernando Naval Museum (Spanish: Museo Naval de San Fernando) is a naval museum located in San Fernando in the Province of Cádiz, Andalusia, Spain. Although a naval museum was called for as early as 28 September 1792. A museum was established in 1843, but the current museum was inaugurated on 27 March 1992, with the main purpose to promote the history of the presence of the Spanish Armada in the area.

== History ==
The project of creating a Naval Museum was born by royal decree of 28 September 1792, of the Secretary of the Navy Antonio Valdés y Fernández Bazán, according to which Carlos IV, had resolved to establish in the military town of San Carlos a Naval Museum that, in addition to the General Library, gathers all the natural sciences that are necessary for the complete instruction of the Navy, and consequent utility in it, but it was not until 27 March 1992, when the current museum was inaugurated. On 6 July 1994, the first official visit was made by King Juan Carlos I and Queen Sofia of Spain.

== Rooms of the museum ==
The museum has 21 rooms that review Spanish military history:

- Foyer: the original idea for the museum is shown, where the portraits of King Carlos III and Antonio Valdés y Fernández Bazán, both promoters of the enlightened ideas of the Spanish Navy, appear.
- Underwater archaeology: objects retrieved from the waters are represented, thanks to underwater archaeology, such as cannons, bullets, ship's tackle, ancient vessels, Phoenician and Roman anchors. An ancient diving suit stands out in the room as the origin of these underwater works.
- Trafalgar: small room where the events of the Battle of Trafalgar, fought at Cape Trafalgar in 1805, are narrated. Models of the English ship HMS Victory and the Spanish ship San Juan Nepomuceno are exhibited.
- Instruments from the Janer Shooting Range: The Janer Firing Range, promoted by Jaime Janer and Robinson on previous ruins5 for the development of modern naval artillery, is in this room represented by instruments for measuring fire as well as photographs of the beginnings of the range.
- Marine Infantry: objects related to the history of the Marine Infantry, highlighting uniforms and old photographs, as well as communication devices and a recoilless cannon.
- Exvotos: around the central rotunda of the Carlos III Building, a collection of exvotos marineros can be seen, a sample of the religious fervour of the men of the sea to the Mother of God.
- Folklore: in the anteroom of the central rotunda, there are several large objects. The clock that belonged to the church of the Arsenal de la Carraca is especially noteworthy, as well as an old carriage known as "La Manolita", which was the official vehicle of the Commander of the old Marine Training Headquarters, within the military town of San Carlos.
- Religious: a small room where religious objects and imagery are housed, most of which come from the Church of San Francisco, in San Fernando.
- Manoeuvre: in the covered courtyard of the building there are large objects, where the first figurehead of the training ship Juan Sebastián Elcano stands out.
- Stairs and central rotunda: the most significant features are the spiral stairs and the dome located at the top. Along the route, a magnificent example of 18th century tilework from Delft (Holland), birthplace of the great Dutch painter Johannes Vermeer, can be seen.
- Flag roundabout: on the second floor of the building, on the perimeter of this roundabout, there are numerous battle flags of Navy ships and scripts of various (Niceto Alcalá Zamora, Francisco Franco and Juan Carlos I).
- Uniforms and decorations: in addition to a great variety of historical uniforms with their accessories and decorations, personal items of Lieutenant Commander Jaime Janer y Robinson, illustrious representative of the naval artillery and promoter of modern naval shooting, as well as those of Admiral Faustino Ruiz González, who was Governor General of the Gulf of Guinea Territories, are presented.
- Juan Sebastián Elcano: room dedicated to both the character and the training ship of the Spanish Navy, with an exhibition of the route of all the training cruises made by the ship. It also includes important historical publications.
- Naval weapons and artillery: examples of both portable and handheld firearms are displayed. There are also portraits of illustrious figures from the naval artillery such as José González Hontoria, a portrait that is now located in the adjoining room.
- Naval chronology: room dedicated to the history of the Spanish Navy, where a large panel explains, graphically, the events of the Navy throughout the history of Spain.
- Underwater weapon: a sample of the representatives of the underwater weapon is exhibited, such as the pieces dedicated to Narciso Monturiol and Isaac Peral, as well as two torpedoes.
- Aerial weapon: within the Navy of the 20th century, the aerial weapon has had a growing importance, with ships as representative as the two Dédalos (seaplane carrier and aircraft carrier) and nowadays with the aircraft carrier Príncipe de Asturias, with the Harrier vertical take-off/landing planes, and finally a sample of the different helicopters at the service of the Navy.
- Models and sailing models: outstanding examples of historical ships, where a model of a 24-gun frigate from the 18th century can be seen. In addition, a magnificent collection of model sailing ships in guaiacan wood is exhibited.
- La Marina del Siglo XX: room dedicated to the 20th century Navy and the great changes that took place. Naval models, components of the ships, such as naval needles, components of a good collection of scientific instruments for sailing, are exhibited. A magnificent watercolour by Aledo stands out in this room, Galera Real del siglo XVI. There are also pieces that frame a brief review of the Spanish Civil War. At the back of the room, the armored cruiser Emperador Carlos V's combat flag, one of the most important pieces in the museum, stands out.
