= Torcuato Benjumeda =

Spanish architect (1757–1836)

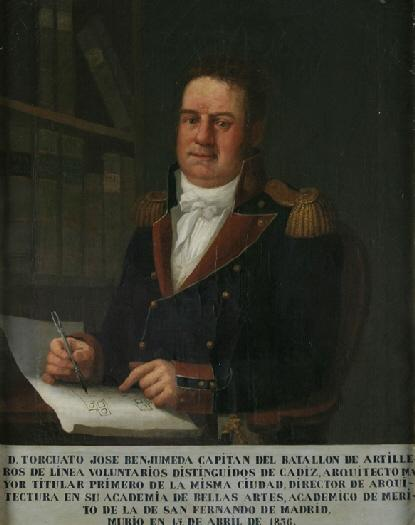
- Torcuato Benjumeda, by Juan Rodríguez Jiménez (Museum of Cádiz)
- Born: 4 January 1757; El Puerto de Santa María, Spain
- Died: 15 April 1836 (aged 79); Cádiz, Spain
- Occupation: Architect
- Parent(s): Miguel Benjumeda; María Laguada

Torcuato José Benjumeda y Laguada (1757, El Puerto de Santa María – 1836, Cádiz) was a Spanish architect. A disciple of Torcuato Cayón, he was one of the most important Neoclassical architects in Andalusia, designing several of the most prominent buildings in Cádiz. These include the Royal Prison, the Church of St. Peter and St. Paul and the Ayuntamiento (town hall).

== Biography ==
Torcuato José Benjumeda y Laguada was born in El Puerto de Santa María on 4 January 1757. The son of Miguel Benjumeda and María Laguada (married in the Priory Church, El Puerto de Santa María in 1756). His father was born in Málaga, son of Francisco Benjumea and Ana Francisca de Gálves, and his mother was a native of San Pedayna in Genoa, daughter of Cayetano Laguada and Rosa Bertorela. Baptized on 9 January in the Priory Church, Benjumeda's godfather was the architect Torcuato Cayón. He married Candida Martinez de Pinillos in the church of Iglesia de San Juan Bautista (Chiclana de la Frontera) on 15 August 1789. The couple had five children. The family moved to Cádiz where they lived at 198 Plazuela de la Cruz Verde. Benjumeda was commissioned to design the Cádiz Town Hall. He died in Cadiz on 15 April 1836.

== Career ==
In 1781, at the age of 24, Benjumeda replaced Torcuato Cayón as Maestro mayor de obras (master of works). In 1789 he was appointed Teniente de Arquitectura de la academia de las Nobles Artes de Cádiz (assuming responsibility for architecture at the Cádiz academy). His studio was at 169 calle Murguía (today Cánovas del Castillo).

During the Siege of Cádiz, he was a second lieutenant in the artillery battalion (26 September 1809), promoted to lieutenant in 1821 and to captain on 23 December 1829.

In 1973, he became an académico de mérito de San Fernando (honorable academic of San Fernando), president of the Academy of Cádiz and the city's principal architect during the heights of its economic and political splendor. In Cádiz he designed the Puerta de Tuerra, Iglesia del Rosario, Iglesia de San José and Iglesia de San Pablo. He completed the Oratorio de la Santa Cueva, initiated by Torcuato Cayón in 1781. Benjumeda also designed the facade of the town hall, the cemetery, and several private houses. The work best reflecting his Neoclassical style is, however, the Royal Prison (1794).

Outside of Cádiz, he built the Iglesia de San Juan Bautista in Chiclana de la Frontera, and the Iglesia de San José in Puerto Real. He participated in the design of the Casa consistorial de San Fernando and designed the Market and the Pier of Puerto Real. He also created the Neoclassical altar in the Priory Church at El Puerto de Santa María.

A black spot occurred in the life of Benjumeda in connection with the Plaza de Toros of Cadiz in 1820. As city architect, he was relieved of his post and salary until he was rehabilitated in 1824. In 1833, he requested permission from the City Council for a leave of absence on health grounds, as he recovered from a nervous breakdown. His substitute was his son Francisco de Paula, who had been appointed assistant on 30 March 1829.

Torcuato Benjumeda died on 15 April 1836, in considerable debt despite his achievements. He was given a second class funeral and buried in Puertas de Tierra outside the city limits of Cádiz.

== Gallery ==
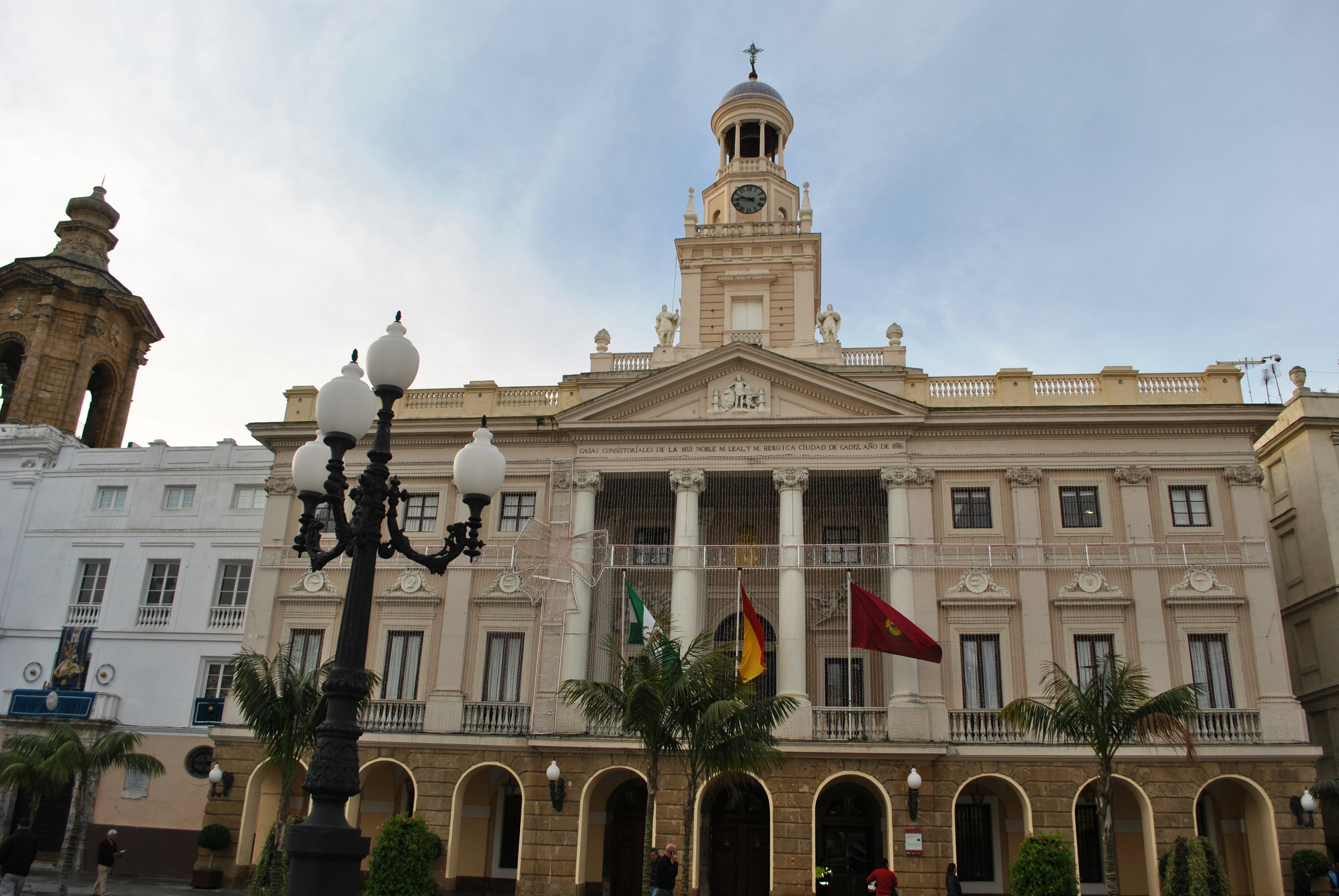
Ayuntamiento, Cádiz

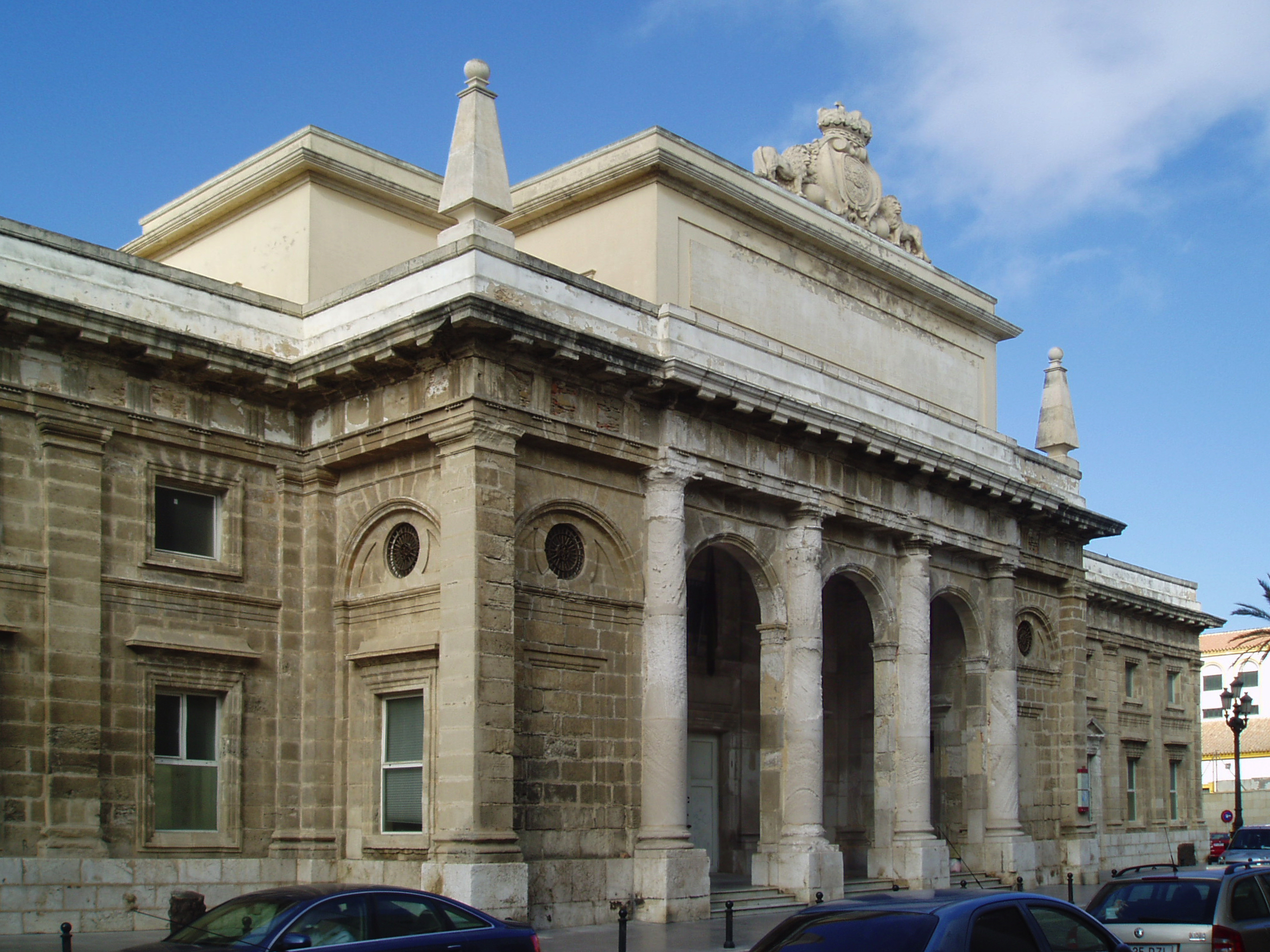
Cárcel Real, Cádiz

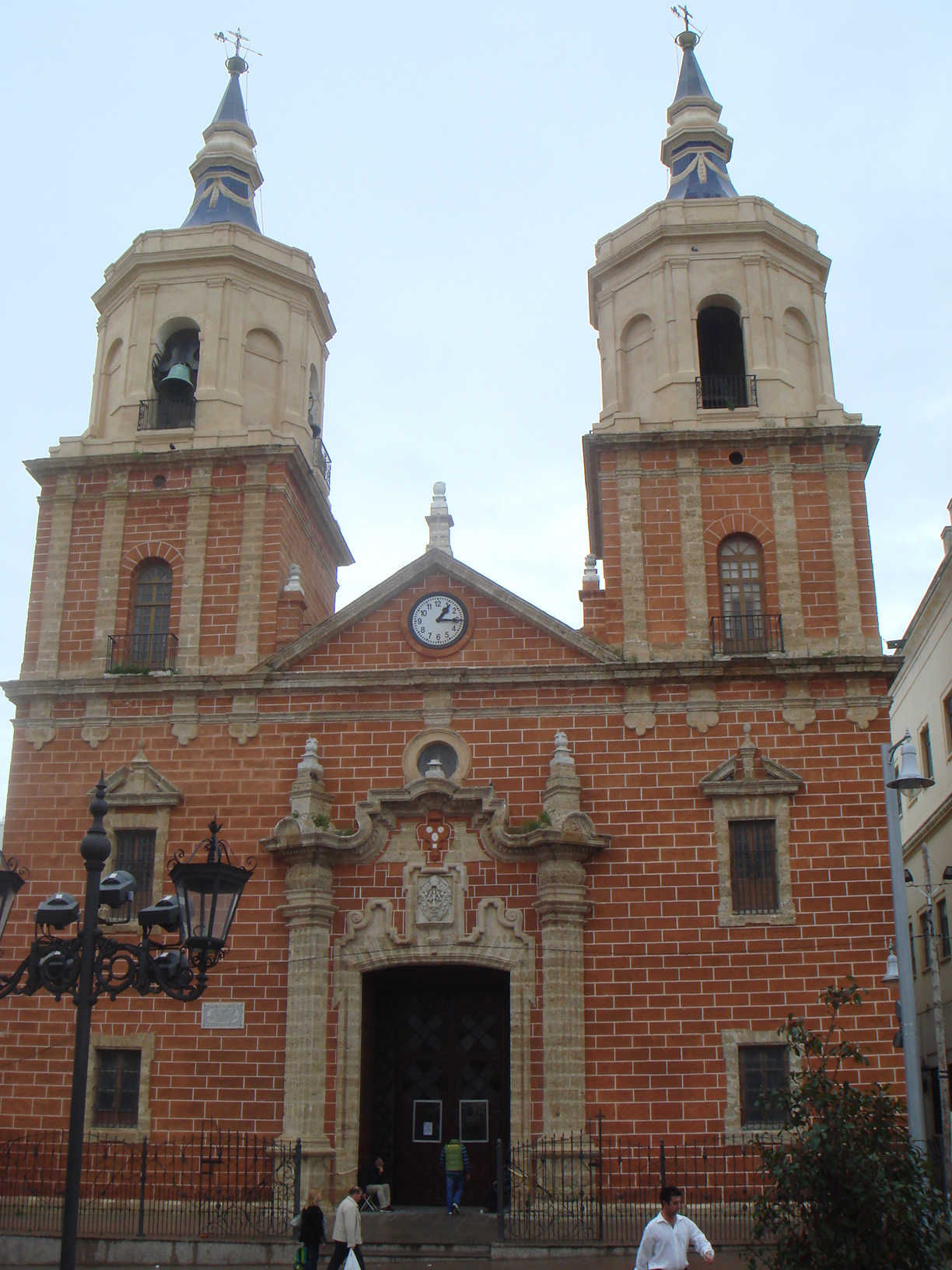
Iglesia Mayor de San Pedro y San Pablo, San Fernando

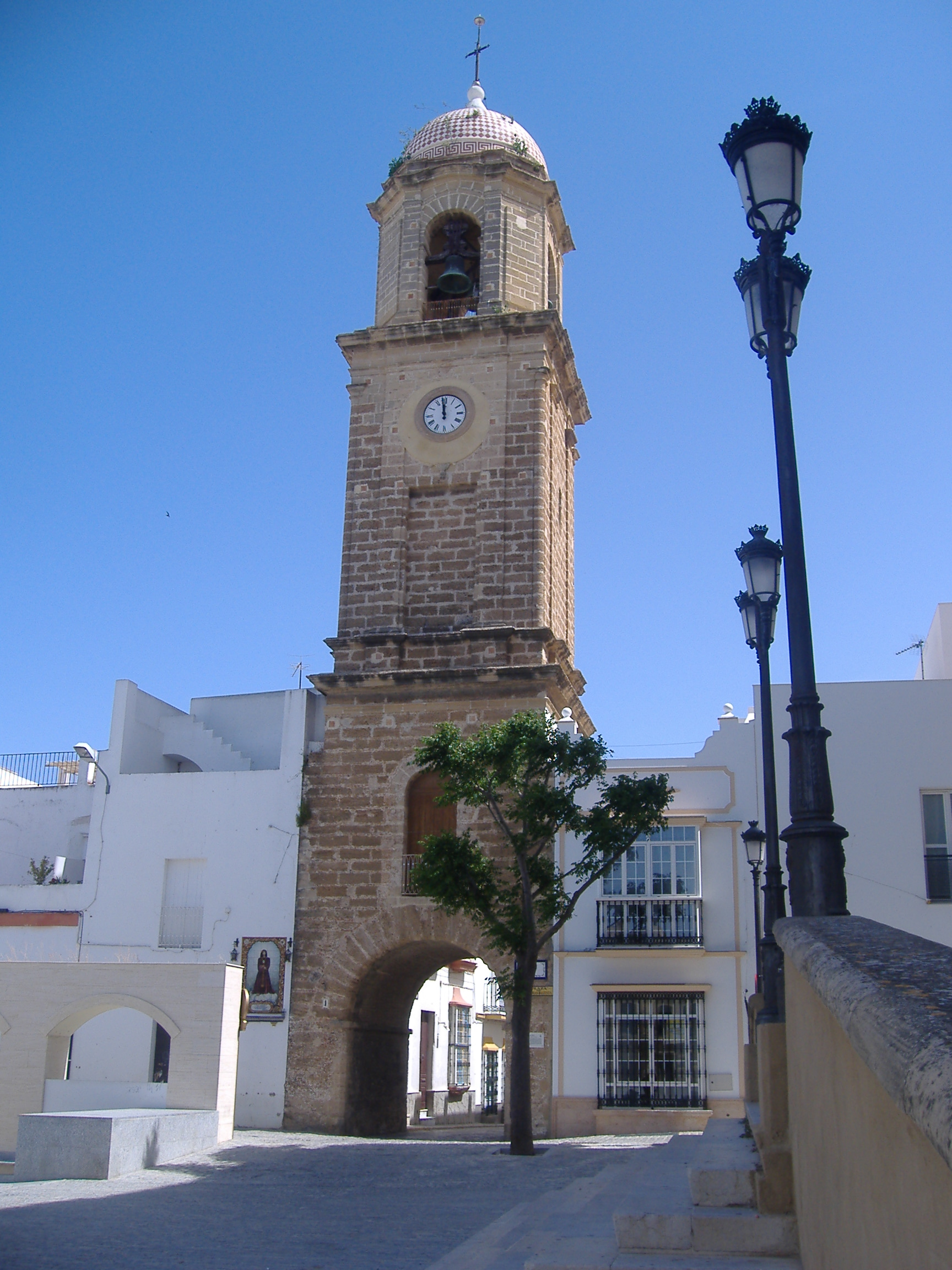
Plaza mayor, Chiclana de la Frontera

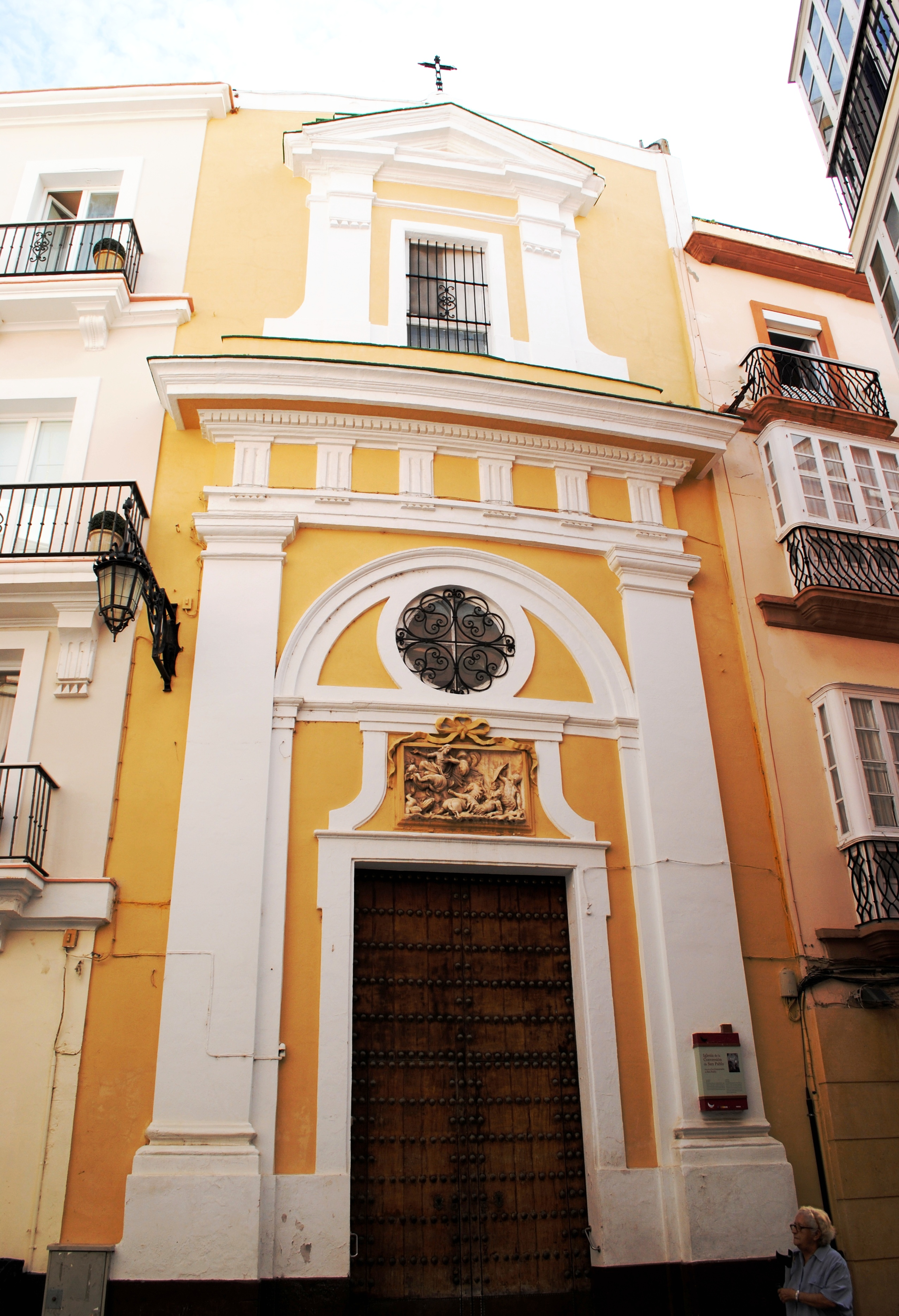
Iglesia de San Pablo, Cádiz

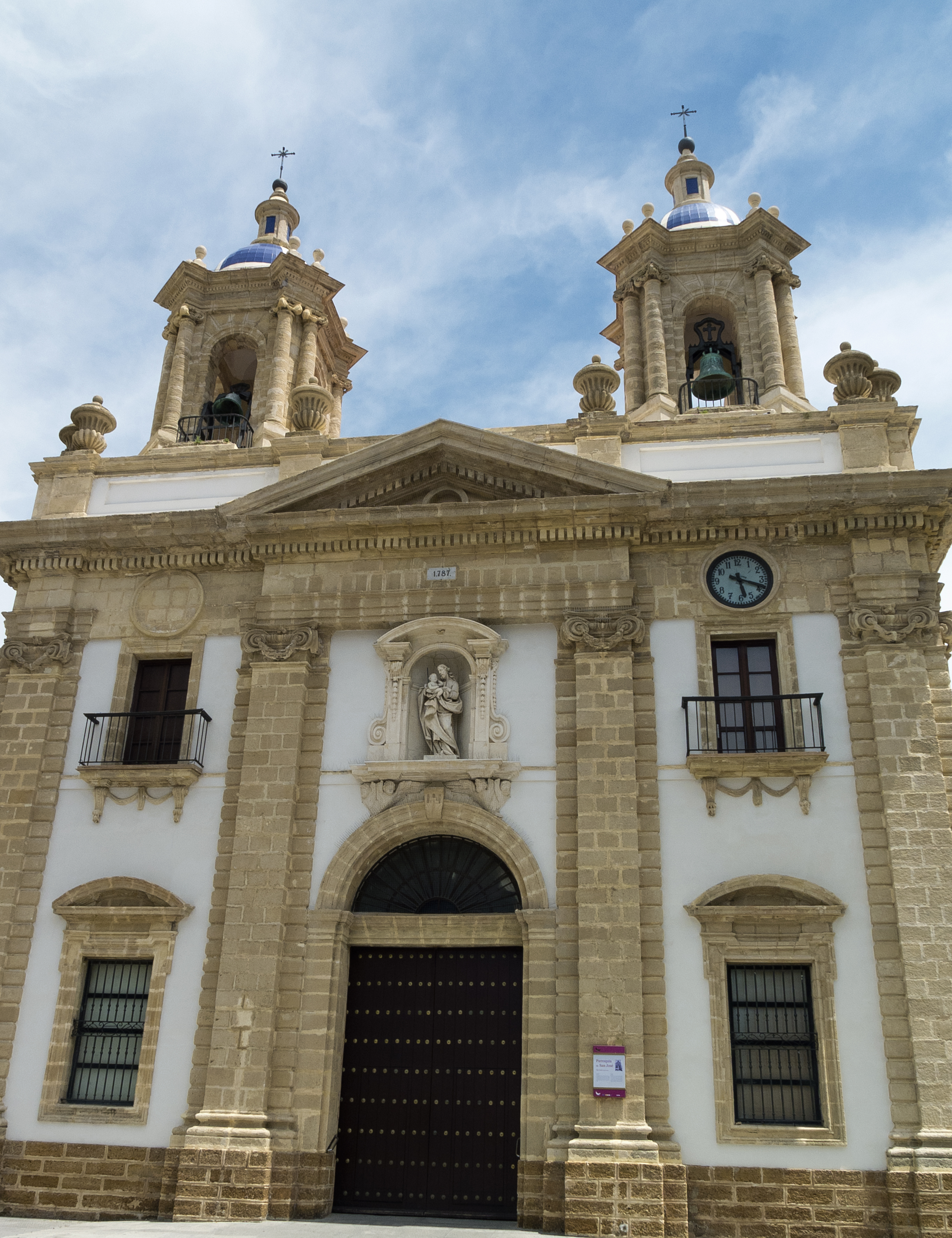
Iglesia de San José, Cádiz

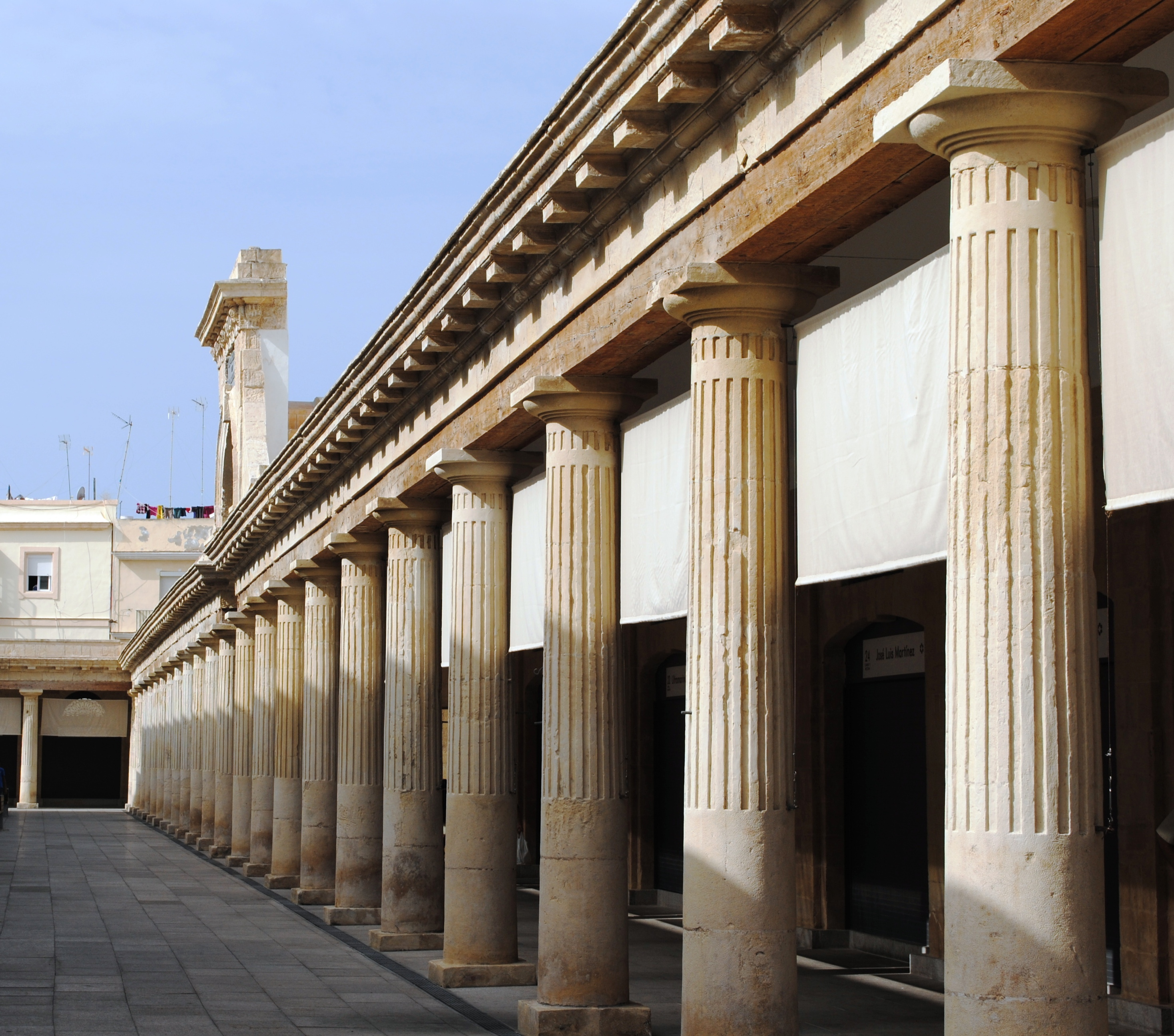
Central Market, Cádiz

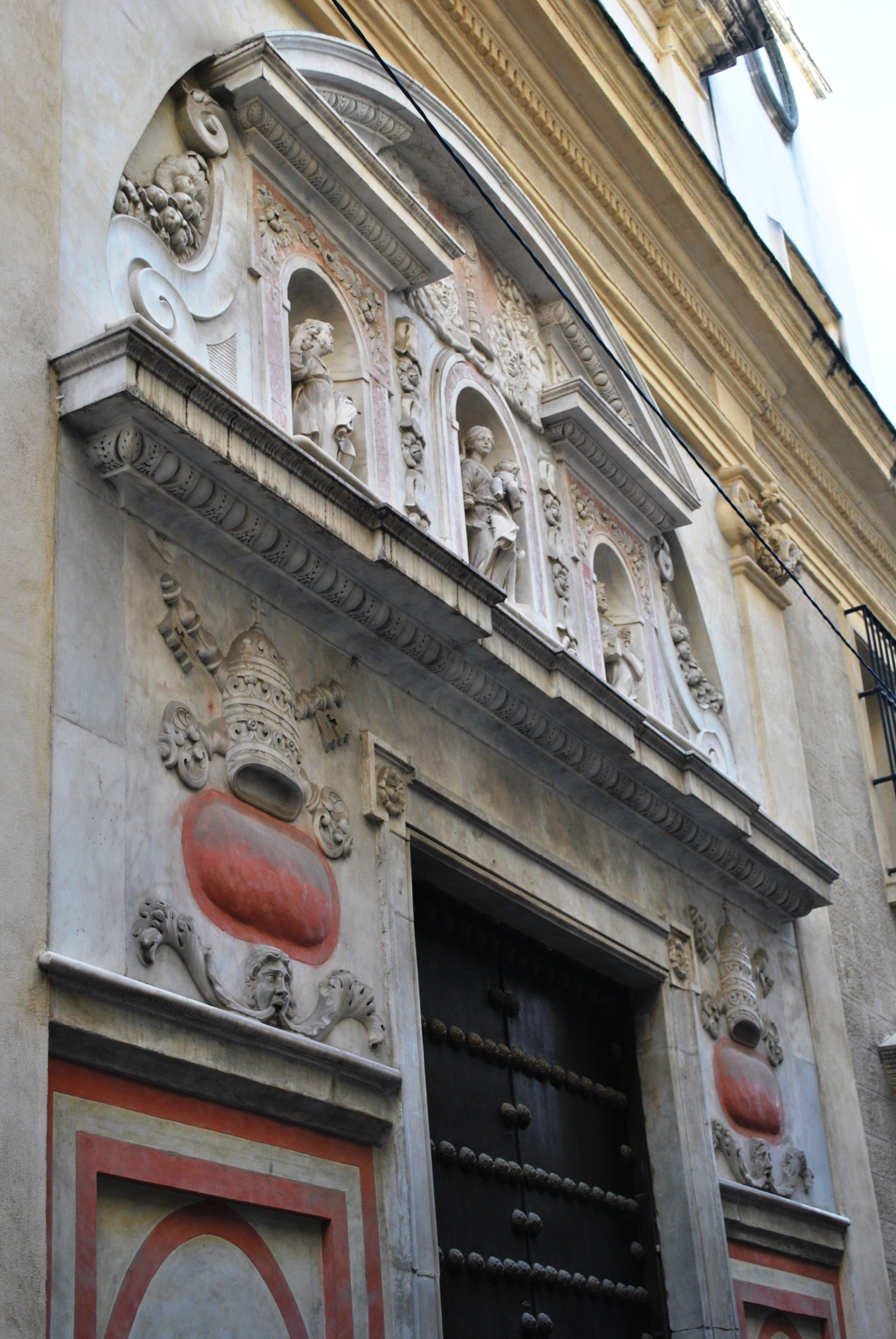
Iglesia del Rosario, Cádiz
