= Plaza de los hornos púnicos y fenicios =

Plaza de los hornos púnicos y fenicios is a plaza located in San Fernando in the Province of Cádiz, Andalusia, Spain.
