= Cárcel Real (Cádiz) =

Spanish neoclassical historical building

Coordinates: 36.5266°N 6.2914°W

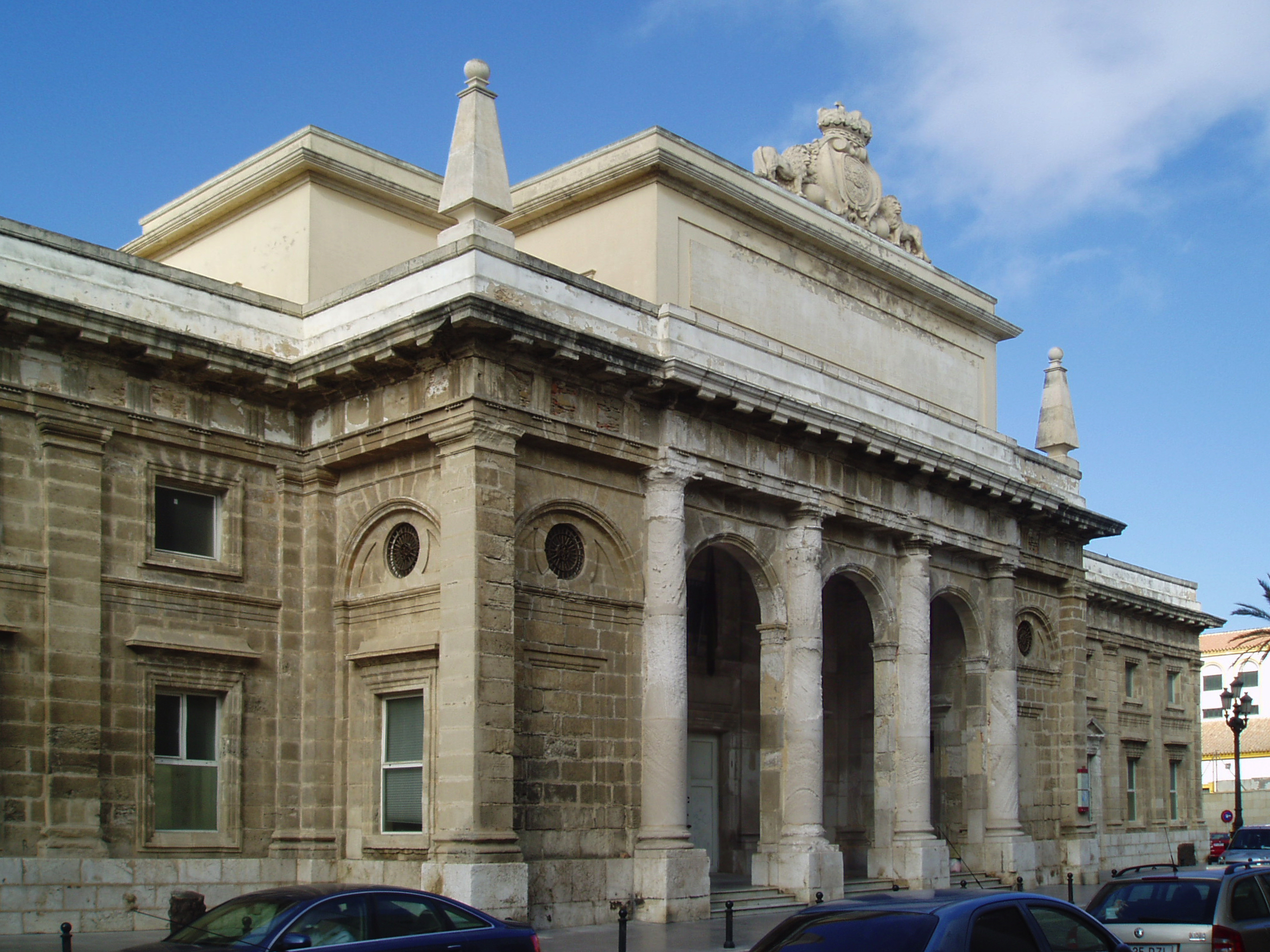
The Cárcel Real, Cádiz.

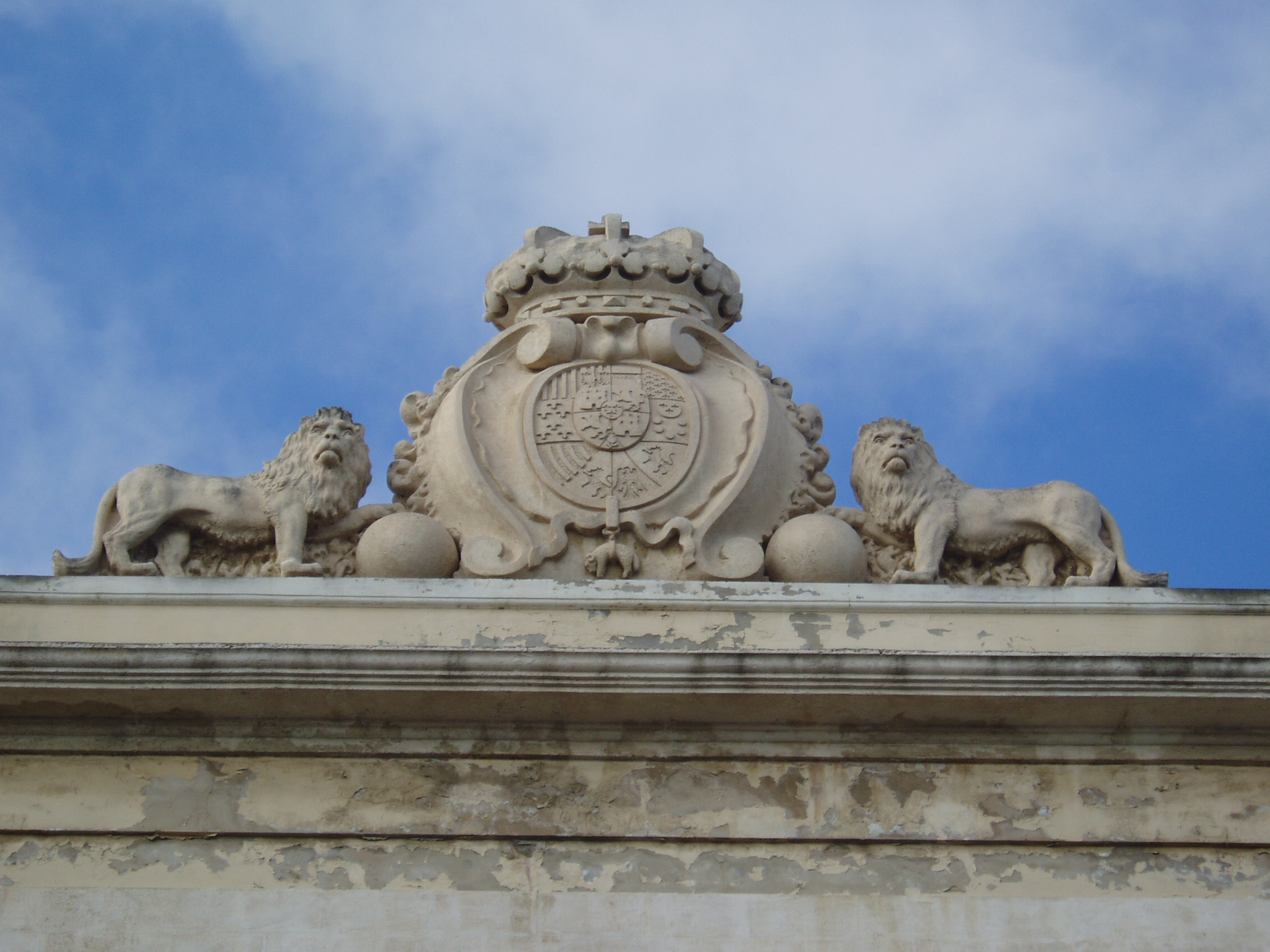
Detail: coat of arms flanked by lions.

The Cárcel Real (Spanish: Royal Prison) is a historical building in Cádiz, southern Spain, an example of Neoclassical architecture.

== History ==
In 1792, the city of Cádiz decided to replace its inadequate, poorly situated, and poorly constructed prison. The new, larger prison would be in a place with better air. Torcuato Benjumeda, the most representative architect of Cádiz at that time, designed the building. This was at the time neoclassicism was beginning to eclipse Baroque architecture in Spain. As Spain entered its long economic decline, the more elaborate Baroque was seen as decadent and in poor taste. The cost of construction was 3.5 million Spanish reales.

Although Benjumeda's plans are dated 1794, they almost certainly were backdated, because he signed with the title "Académico de mérito", which he was not granted until 1807. The city of Cádiz itself is referred to as "Muy Heroica", a title it was conceded in 1816 as a result of the Peninsular War (Spanish War of Independence).

The building opened for use in 1836, at which time a large portion of it had been completed under the leadership of architect Juan Daura. At that time the last portion, closest to the sea was incomplete; indeed it would not be completed until a rehabilitation in 1990. That last project was directed for the Ministry of Justice by J. Montes Deza, adapting the building for use as a courthouse, and saving it from a state of near-ruin. Following the original plans, he completed the final portion of the building and installed a rectangular attic at the top of the projecting principal façade, with a large shield and two pinnacles on the sides.

== Description ==
The building is rectangular, 66.87 metres (219.4 ft) by 33.45 metres (109.7 ft) in size, and perfectly symmetrical in the Neoclassical style. It is organized around a square central courtyard and two smaller rectangular courtyards, which are located to the sides. The cells and other facilities are distributed around these.

The building is two stories high, with a projecting mass at the center of the principal façade. Tuscan pilasters, of the giant order (banked on a base), frame the openings. The wide windows of the lower floor have a simple horizontal dust guard, which becomes concave at its lower ends. Over the pilasters is an entablature, with a frieze of triglyphs and, below them, three guttae.

The projecting mass at the center of the principal façade has four terraced Tuscan columns, as well as twinned Tuscan pillars at the ends. On the two shorter sides of the projecting mass, over the bays of the lower floor (and delineated by pilasters), are several blind semicircles, over which an oculus is inscribed. An inscription near the mean entrance reads "odia el delito, compadece al delincuente" ("hate the crime, pity the criminal"), a quotation from Concepción Arenal.

Enrique Romero de Torres in his Catálogo Monumental de España - Provincia de Cádiz, considered the building to be "the most architecturally tasteful civil building in Cádiz" and added, "if it were not for the legend already cited ['Hate the crime, pity the criminal'], one could think to have been constructed for a museum or a literary center".
