= Carmen Guaita =

Spanish writer

Carmen Guaita Fernández (born San Fernando, Cádiz, 1960) is a Spanish writer and school teacher of philosophy.

== Early life ==
Fernández was born in San Fernando but her family moved to Madrid.

== Career ==
She is a member of several associations about arbitration and deontology, and of the NGO Delwende, which supports education projects. She also collaborates in different media like INED 21.

In 2019, she published the last book of her trilogy titled "Todo se olvida," which discussed forgiveness and Alzheimer's.

== Works ==
- Los amigos de mis hijos (2007)
- Contigo aprendí (2008)
- Desconocidas, una geometría de las mujeres (2009)
- La flor de la esperanza (2010)
- Memorias de la pizarra (2012)
- Cartas para encender linternas (2012)
- Jilgueros en la cabeza (2015)
- Encuentros:Reflexiones y parábolas (2017)
- Todo se olvida (2019)
