= Puente Marqués de Ureña =

Coordinates: 36°29′4″N 6°11′35″W

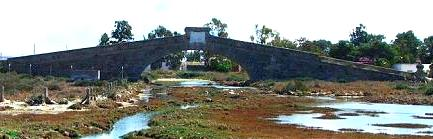

Puente Marqués de Ureña is a bridge located in San Fernando in the Province of Cádiz, Andalusia, Spain. It was built in the 18th century in honour of the Marqués de Ureña.
