= Capitanía General de San Fernando =

Historic building in San Fernando, Spain

Coordinates: 36°28′02″N 6°11′37″W

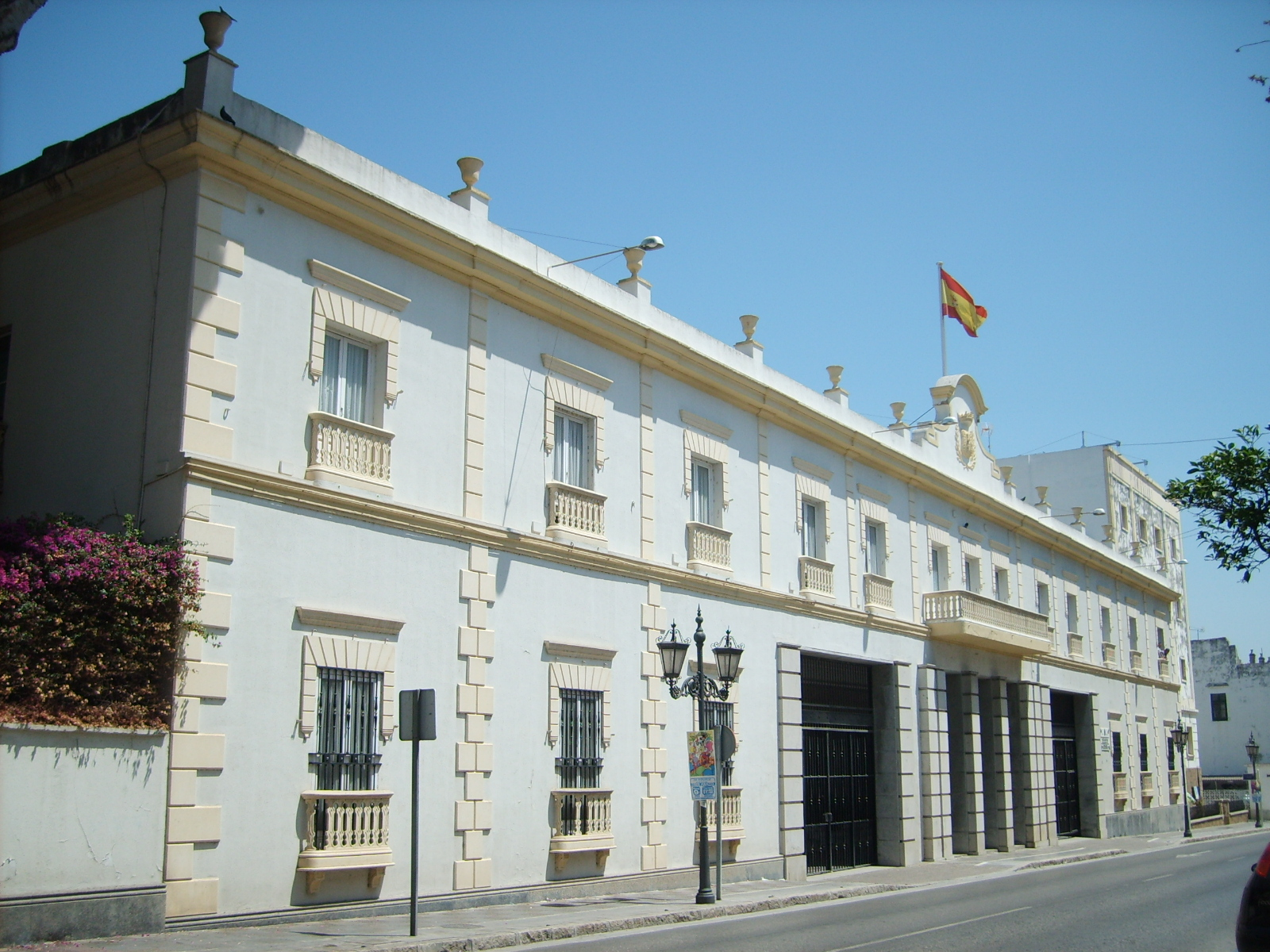
Capitanía General de San Fernando

Capitanía General de San Fernando is an institution of the Spanish Armada, located in San Fernando in the Province of Cádiz, Andalusia, Spain. It was moved from Cadiz to San Fernando in 1769, and then relocated to its current location at the end of the Calle Real in the year 1917.
