= Castillo de San Romualdo =

Castle in the Province of Cádiz, Andalusia, Spain

Coordinates: 36°28′05″N 6°11′31″W

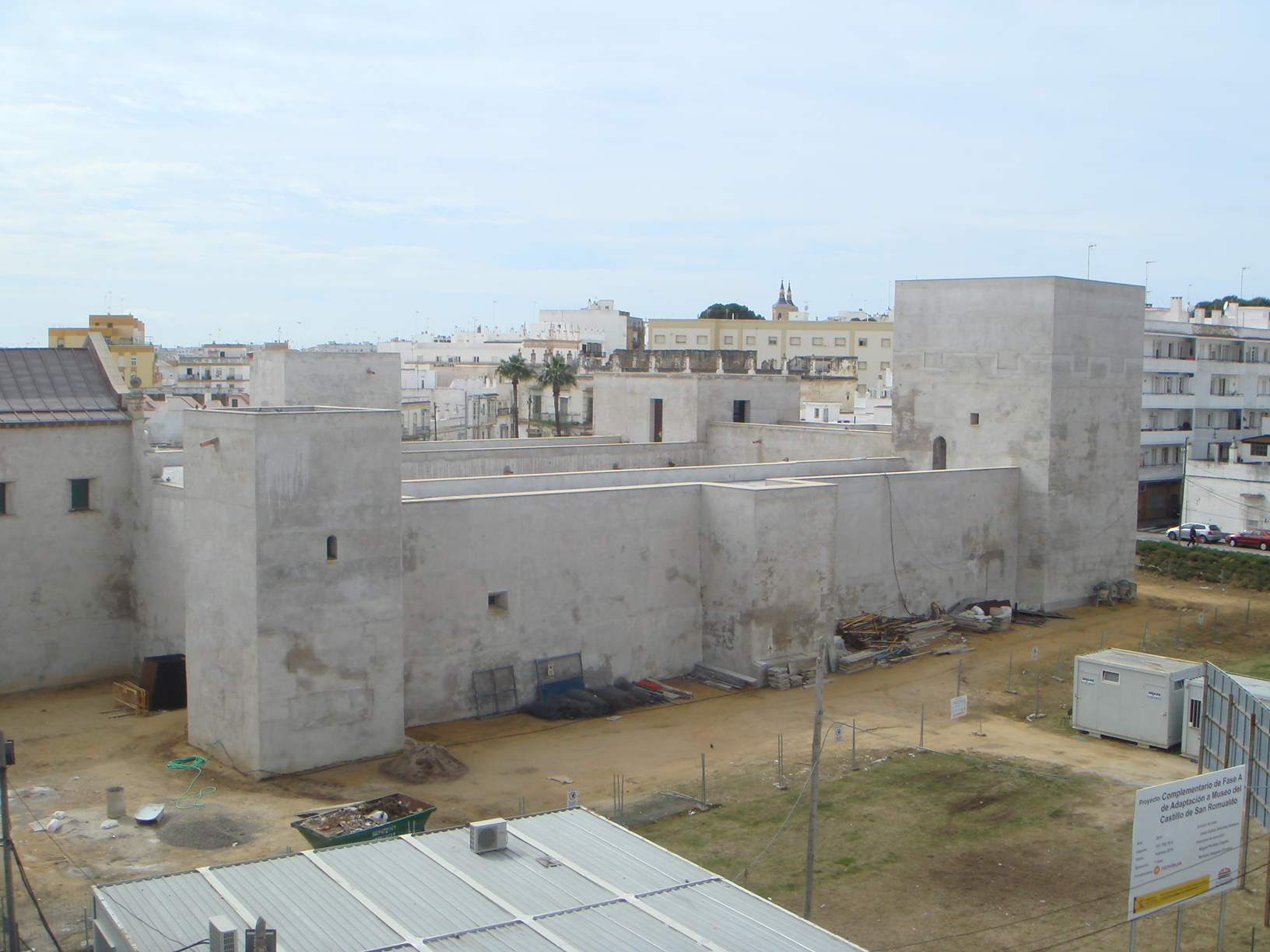
Castillo de San Romualdo

Castillo de San Romualdo is a castle located in San Fernando in the Province of Cádiz, Andalusia, Spain. Built in the Mudéjar style, it was first mentioned in 1268. It is a protected monument on the Bien de Interés Cultural register.
