= Iglesia de San Juan Bautista (Chiclana de la Frontera) =

Church in Chiclana de la Frontera, Spain

Coordinates: 36.418034°N 6.146211°W

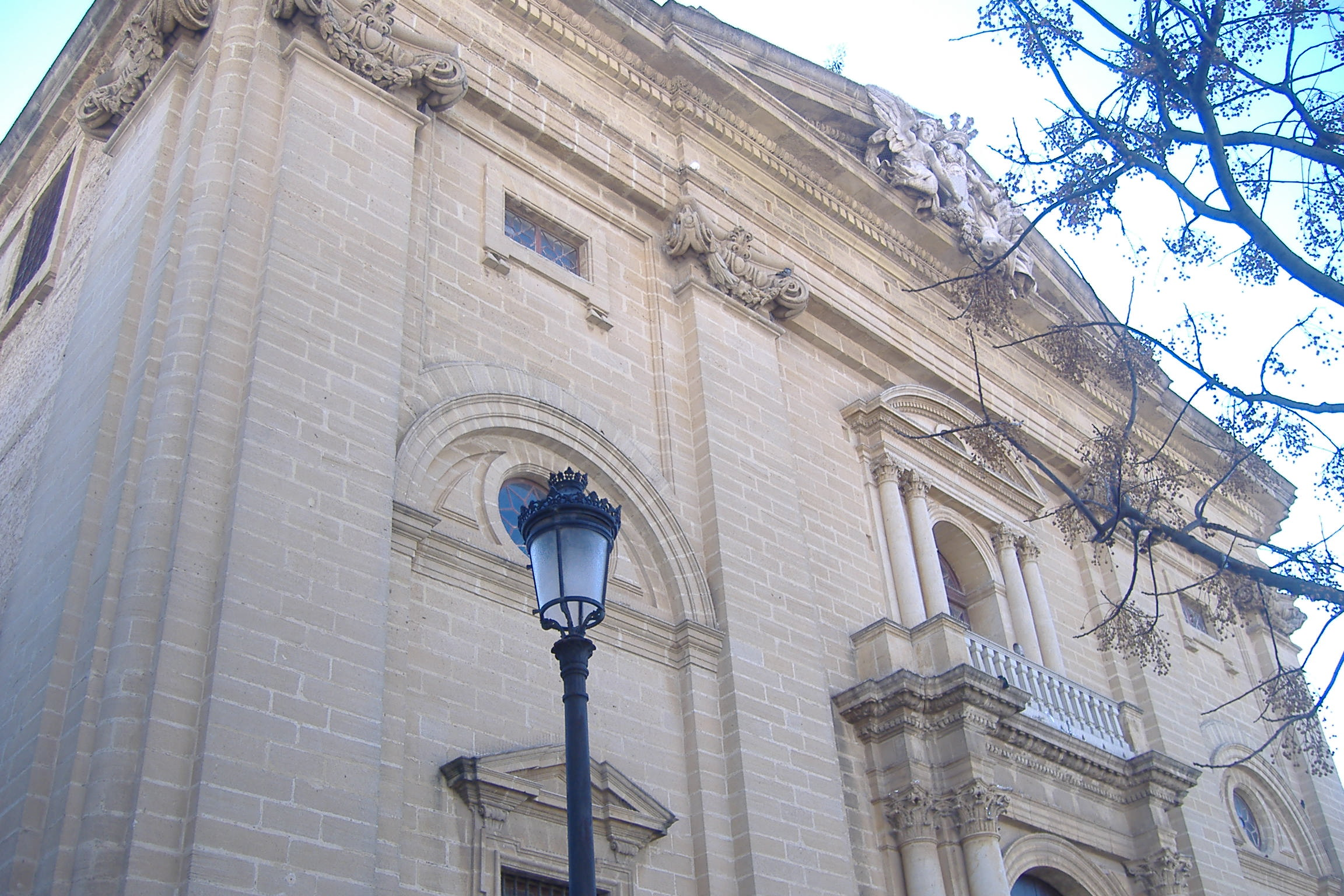
Iglesia Mayor de San Juan Bautista

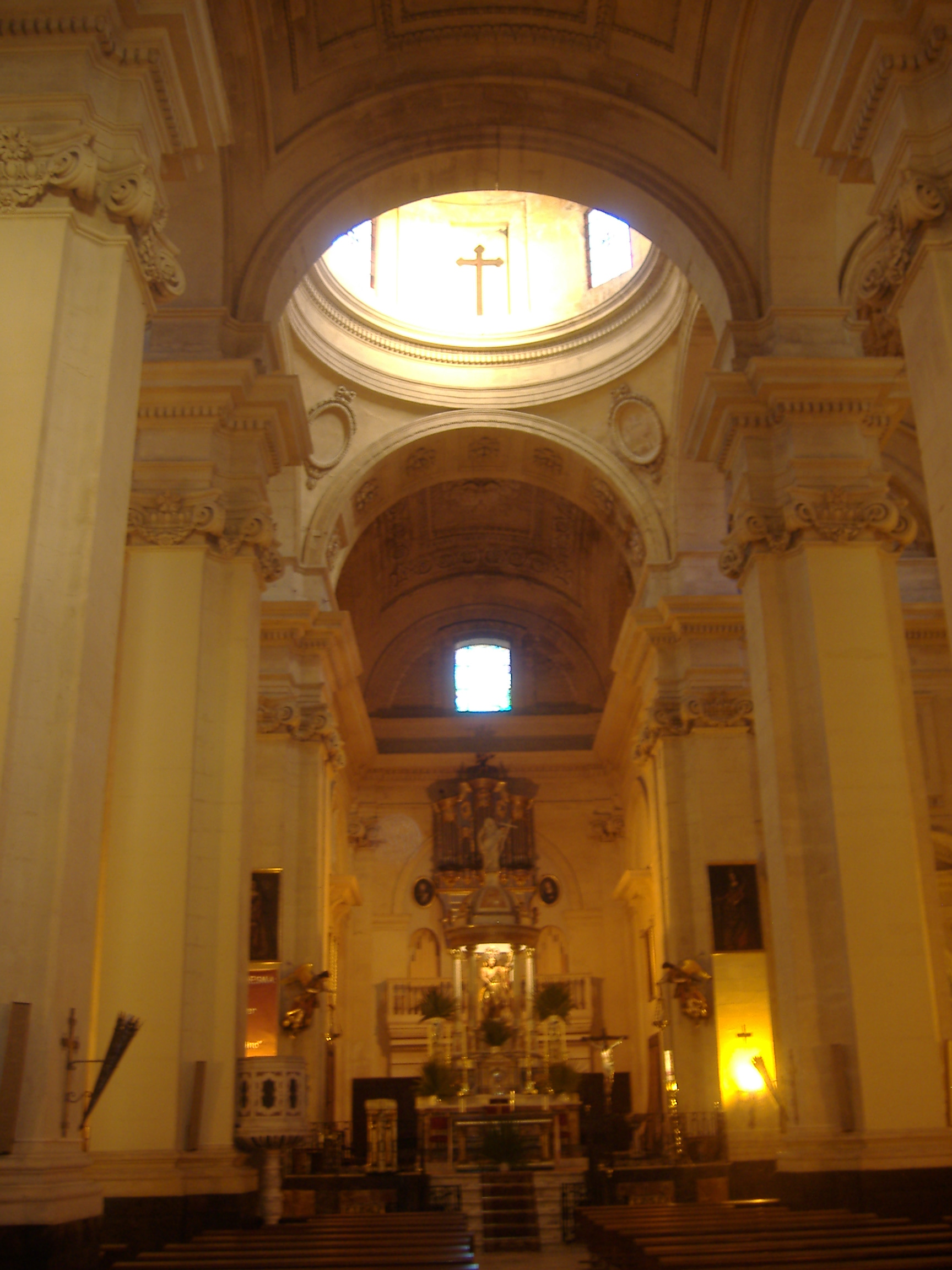
Interior

Iglesia de San Juan Bautista (Church of St. John the Baptist) is a Neoclassical church in Chiclana de la Frontera, in the Province of Cádiz, Andalusia, southern Spain.

Construction on an earlier building began around 1510, in a slow building process, and was still not completed by 1576. The original church was demolished in the eighteenth century because it was impossible to undertake its expansion, due to its state of ruin. A bas-relief of the altarpiece dated to 1552 by the sculptor Roque Balduque and the painter Andrés Ramírez was salvaged.

The architect Torcuato Cayón, then in charge of the works of the new Cádiz Cathedral, and a key figure in the transition from Baroque to neoclassical architecture in this area, was responsible for designing the new church, built from 1776 under his direction until his death in 1783. It was eventually fully completed in 1814.

== See also ==
- List of Bien de Interés Cultural in the Province of Cádiz

== Bibliography ==
- "Diccionario Enciclopédico Ilustrado de la provincia de Cádiz". Patrocinado por: Caja de Ahorros de Jerez. Año 1985
- "Enciclopedia Gráfica Gaditana". Vol.I N.º 9. Antón Solé, Pablo: Iglesias entre el Guadalete y el Barbate. Año 1984.
