= Museo Histórico Municipal de San Fernando =

Museum in San Fernando, Spain

- Museo Histórico Municipal de San Fernando
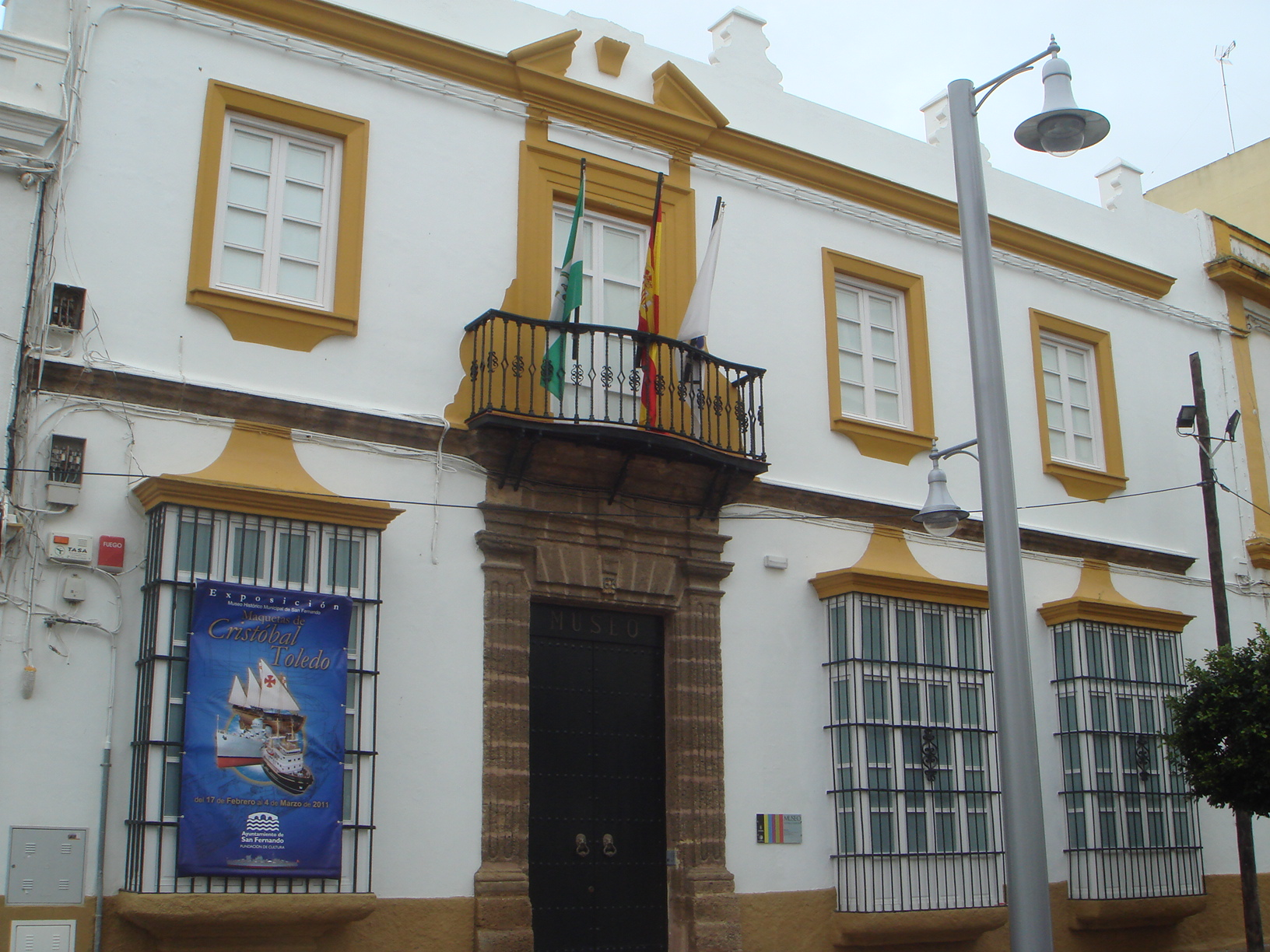
- Location: San Fernando, Spain
- Coordinates: 36°27′59″N 6°11′42″W
- Type: museum
- Website: www.museomunicipalsanfernando.com
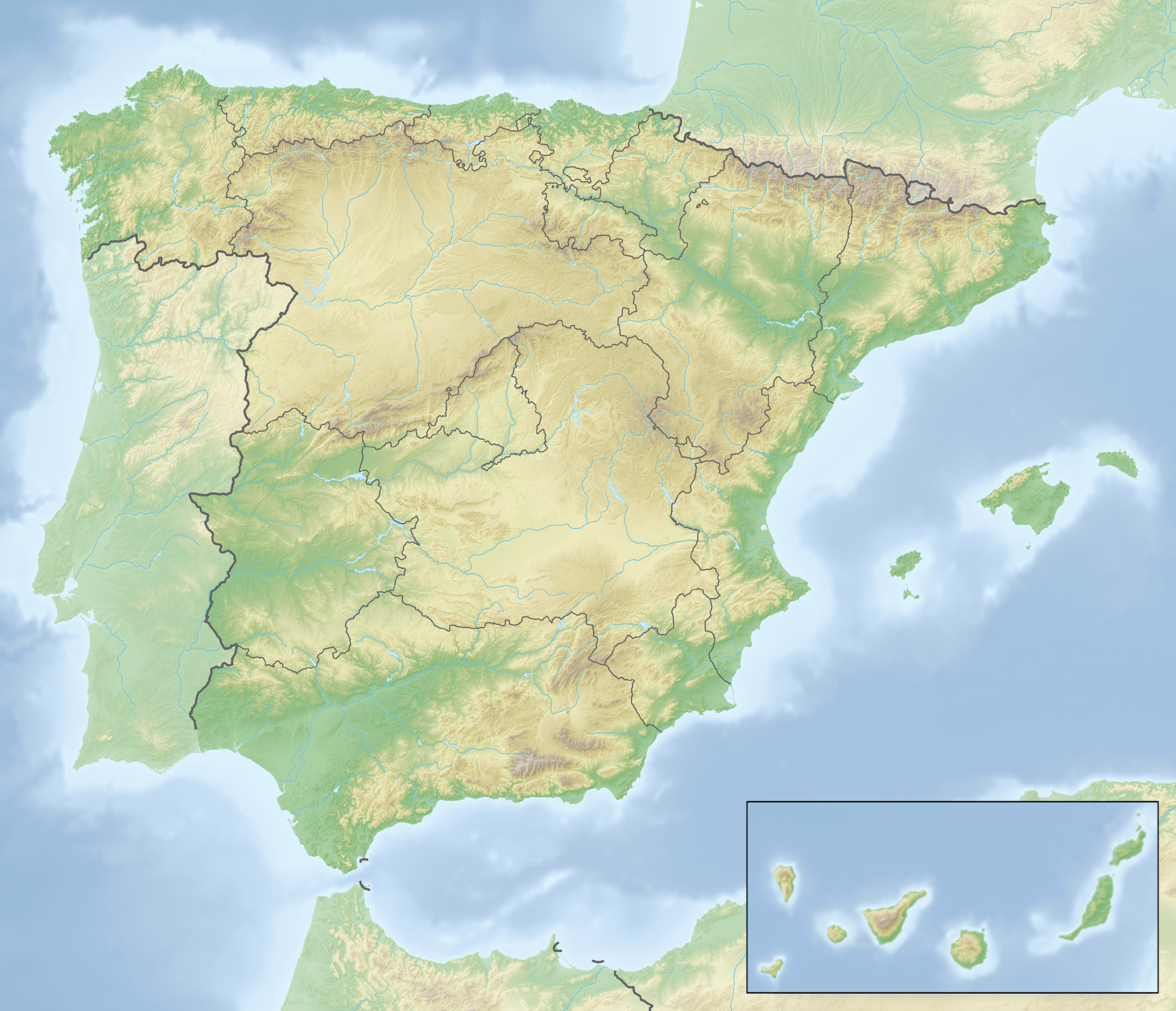
- Location of Museo Histórico Municipal de San Fernando

Museo Histórico Municipal de San Fernando is a museum located at 63 Calle Real in San Fernando in the Province of Cádiz, Andalusia, Spain. The building was built in 1755 by a merchant of Cadiz, Alonso Ortega y Muñiz, on the grounds of the Dean of the Cathedral of Cadiz. Until its acquisition by the city, it housed the Clinic Empresa Nacional Bazán or Palomo Clinic from 1949. It was inaugurated as a municipal historical museum on 28 March 1986.

The exhibitions take place in six rooms and a main courtyard is used for temporary exhibitions. The rooms are arranged chronologically from the oldest material to the 20th century.
