= San Fernando, Spain =

San Fernando
- Municipality and city
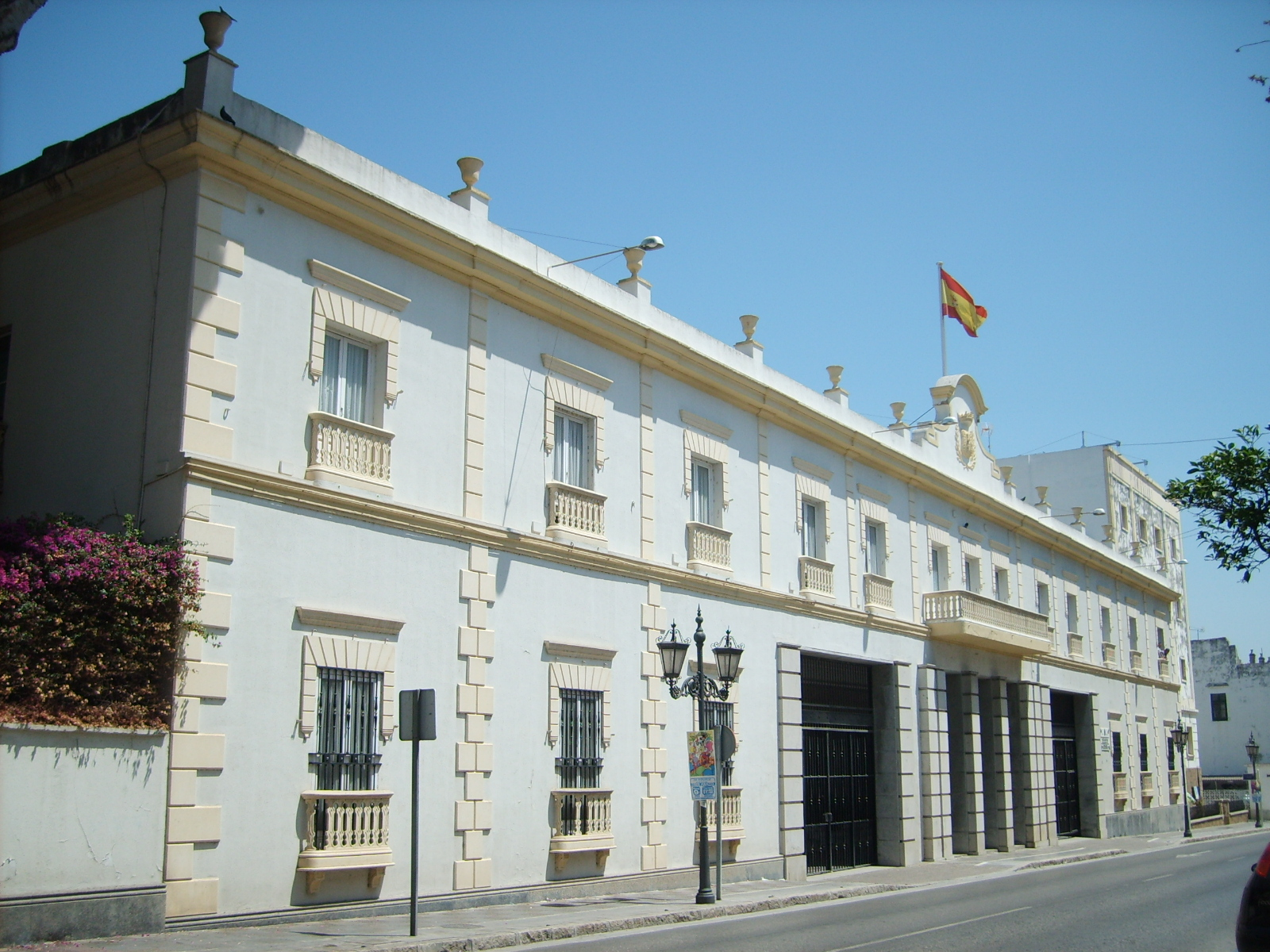
- Town hall

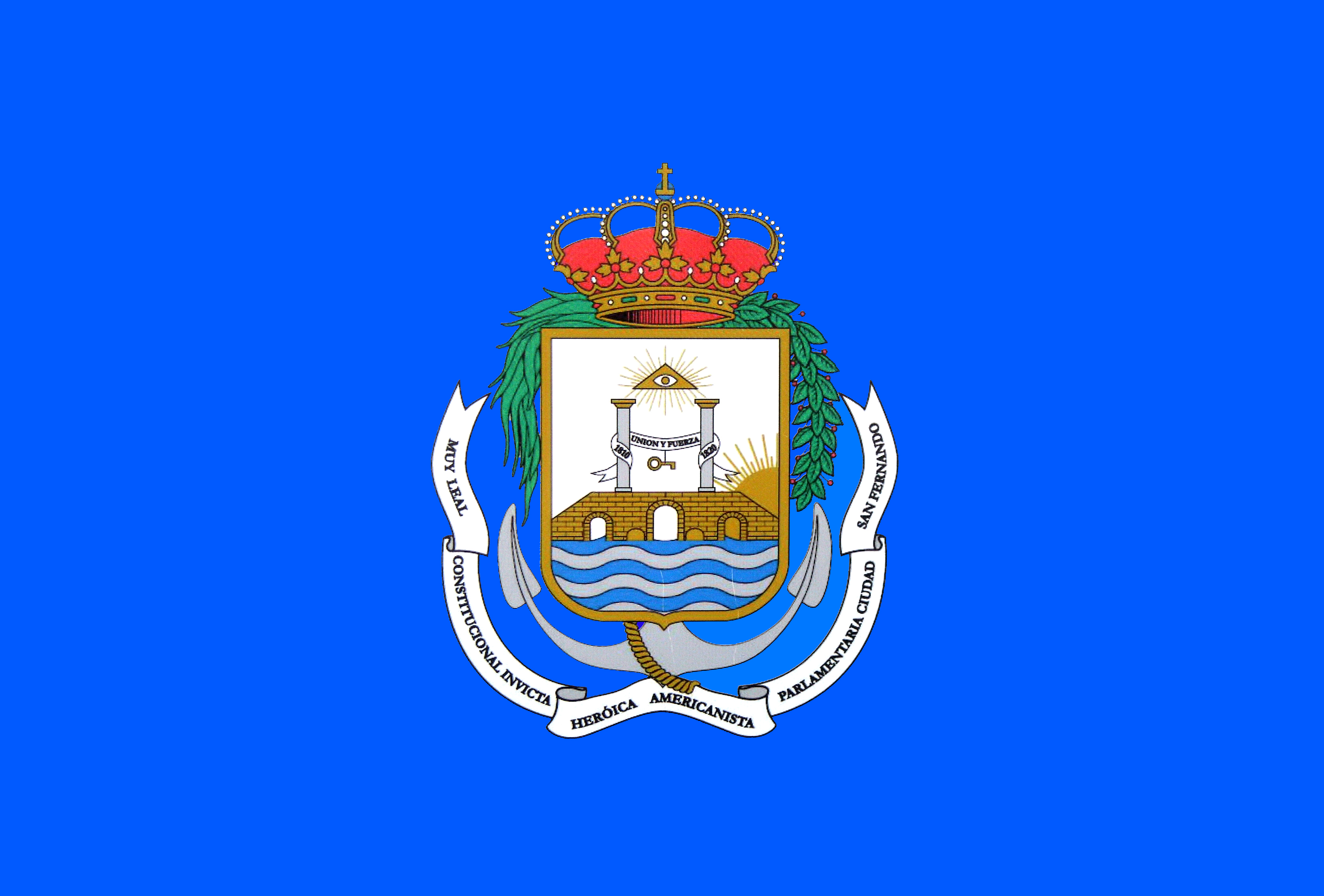
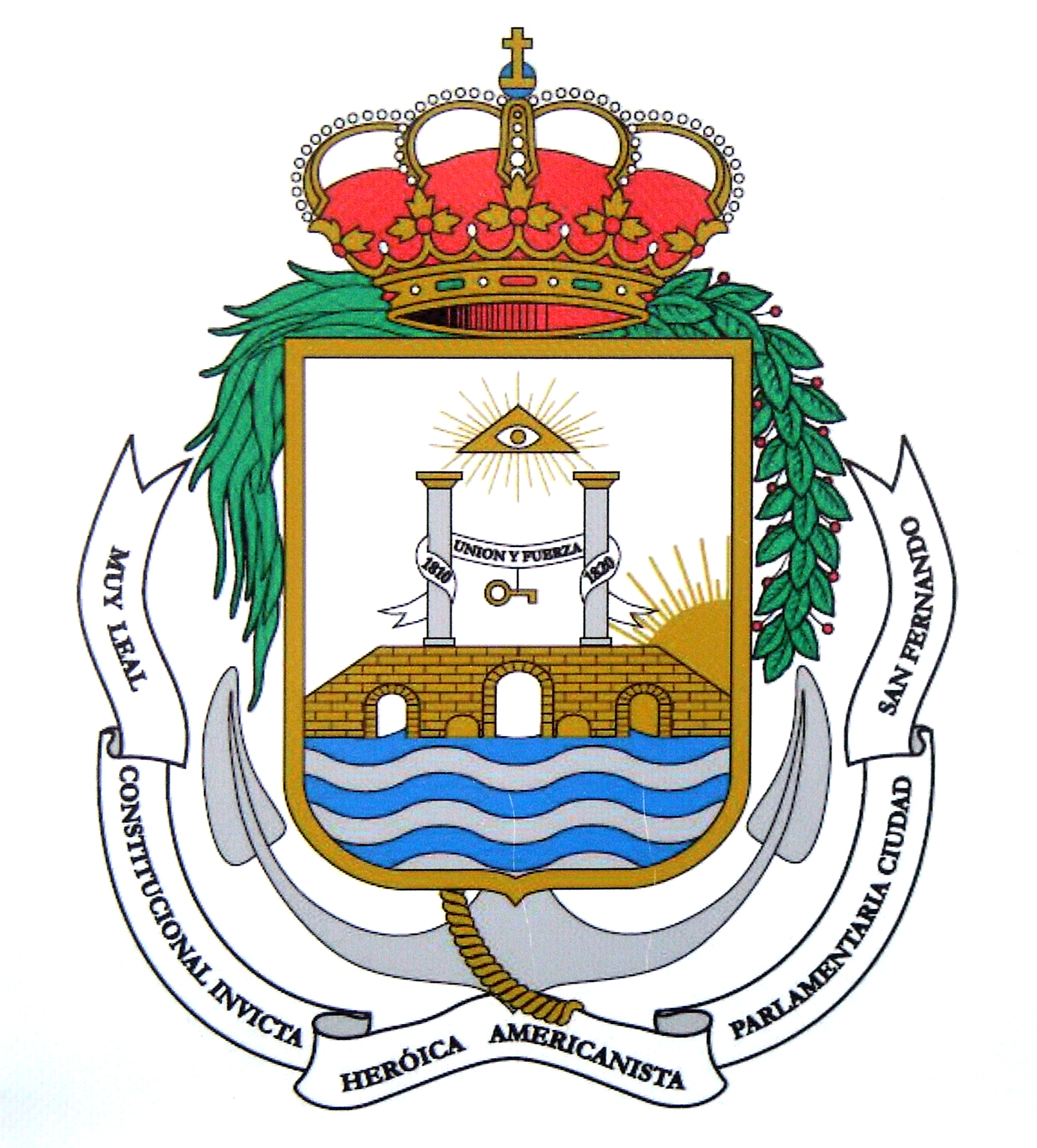
- Flag Coat of arms
- Interactive map of San Fernando
- Coordinates: 36°28′N 6°12′W
- Country: Spain
- Autonomous community: Andalusia
- Province: Cádiz
- Comarca: Bay of Cádiz
- Judicial district: San Fernando
- Commonwealth: Municipes of the Bahía de Cádiz

Government
  - Alcalde: Patricia Cavada Montañés (PSOE)

Area
  - Total: 30.65 km^{2} (11.83 sq mi)
- Elevation: 8 m (26 ft)

Population (2025-01-01)
  - Total: 93,338
  - Density: 3,045/km^{2} (7,887/sq mi)
- Demonym: Isleño
- Time zone: UTC+1 (CET)
  - Summer (DST): UTC+2 (CEST)
- Postal code: 11100
- Official language(s): Spanish
- Website: Official website

San Fernando (Spanish pronunciation: [ˈsaɱ feɾˈnando], lit. 'Saint Ferdinand') is a town in the province of Cádiz, Spain. It is home to more than 97,500 inhabitants. The city also uses the name "La Isla" (The Island). The people from San Fernando are locally known as "Cañaíllas" or "Isleños".

== History ==
In history, the city played a paramount role when in 1810 during the Peninsular War led by Napoleon, San Fernando and Cádiz were the only parts of Spain which were never occupied by the French, until the French withdrawal in defeat from Spain in 1814.

The deputies elected to the Cortes of Cádiz met in the Teatro Cómico, and started preparation of the first liberal constitution of Spain, which was approved in the neighbouring city of Cádiz in 1812.

Flamenco singer Camarón de la Isla was born in San Fernando.

It holds the Panteón de Marinos Ilustres.

== Notable people ==
- Julia Medina, singer
- Magdalena Álvarez, politician
- Sara Baras, flamenco dancer
- Luis Berenguer, writer
- Juan Ruiz Casaux, cellist and teacher
- Camarón de la Isla, flamenco singer
- Fermín Galán (1899–1930), Spanish soldier who led the failed Jaca uprising
- Carmen Guaita, writer
- Anne Hidalgo, incumbent Mayor of Paris
- Francisco José Maldonado, footballer
- Abraham Mateo, singer and actor
- Pepe Oneto, journalist
- Rafael Gómez Ortega, bullfighter
- Niña Pastori, flamenco singer
- Yordi, footballer
- Servando Sánchez, footballer
- David Barral Torres, footballer
- Abraham Mateo, pop singer
- Monchi, footballer
- José Enrique Varela (1891–1951), military officer

== Twin towns – sister cities ==
San Fernando is twinned with:

- Montigny-le-Bretonneux, France

== Demographics ==
Historical population
Year	Pop.	±%
2016	95,949	—
2017	95,643	−0.3%
2018	95,174	−0.5%
2019	94,979	−0.2%
2020	95,001	+0.0%
2021	94,867	−0.1%
2022	94,120	−0.8%
2023	93,927	−0.2%
Source: INE (Spain)

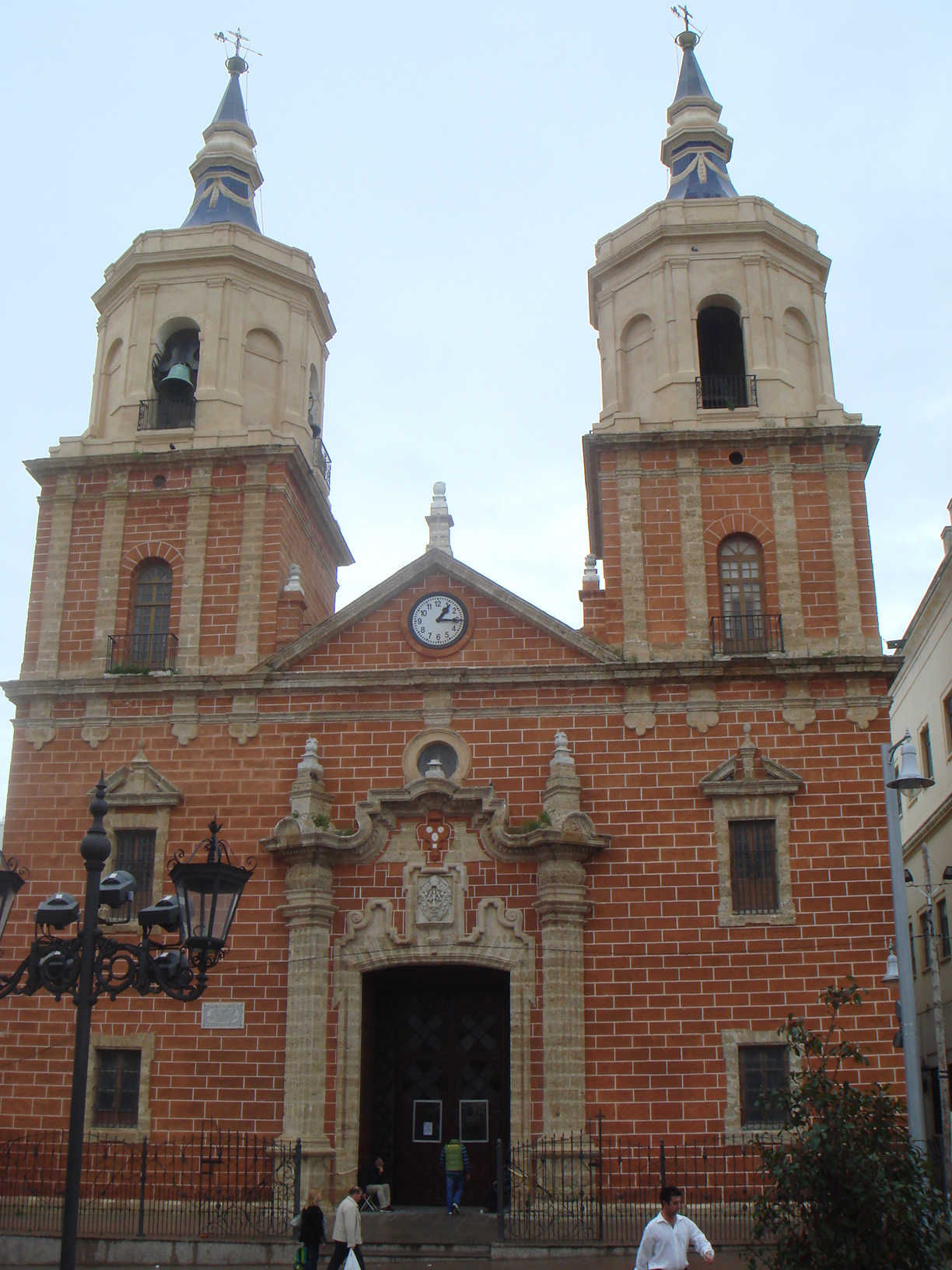
Church of San Pedro y San Pablo

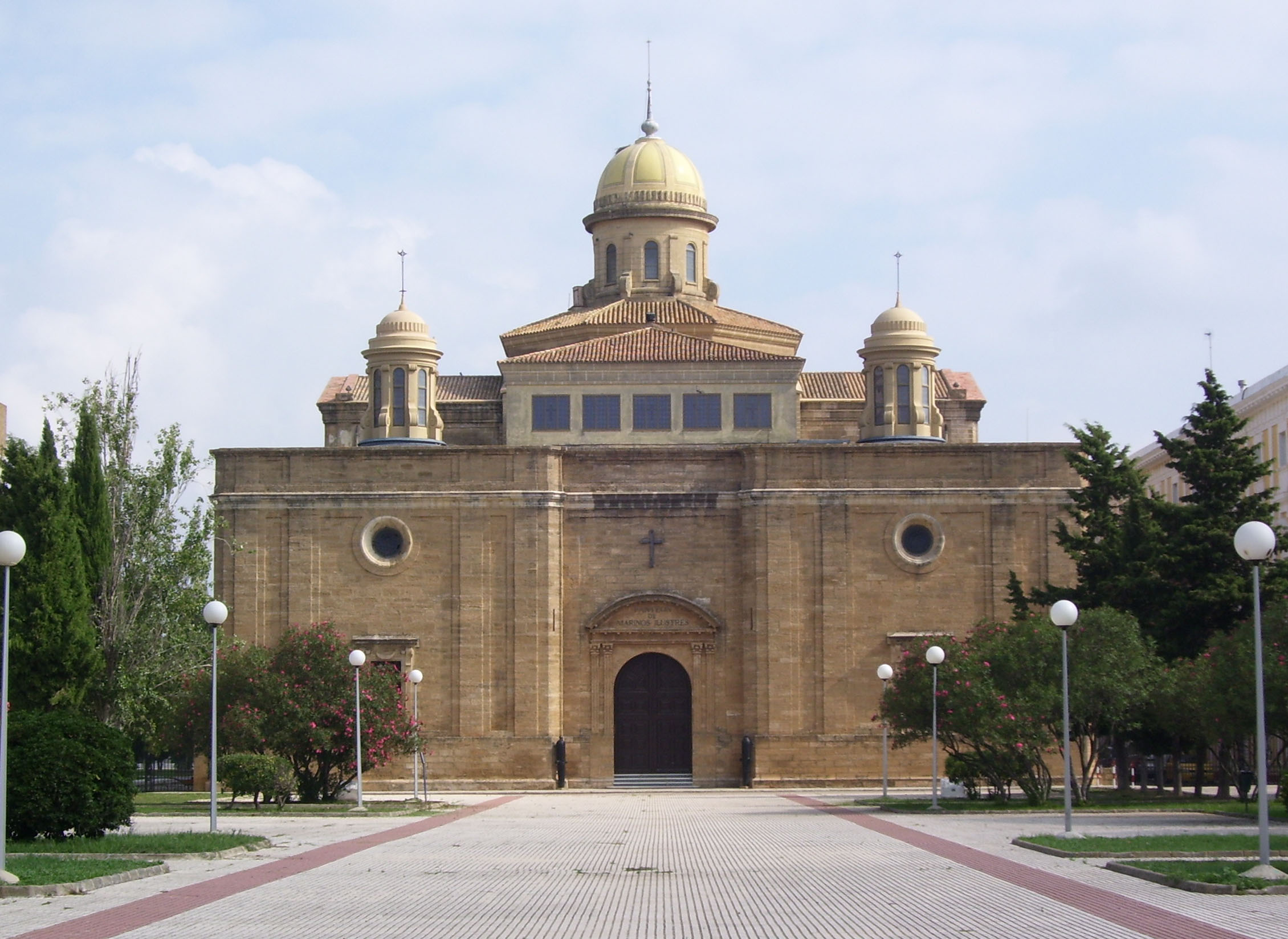
Panteón de Marinos Ilustres

== See also ==
- Iglesia Vaticana Castrense de San Francisco
- Plaza de los hornos púnicos y fenicios
- Puente Marqués de Ureña
- San Fernando Naval Museum
- List of municipalities in Cádiz
