= Bay of Gibraltar =

Bay at the southern tip of the Iberian Peninsula, shared by Spain and Gibraltar

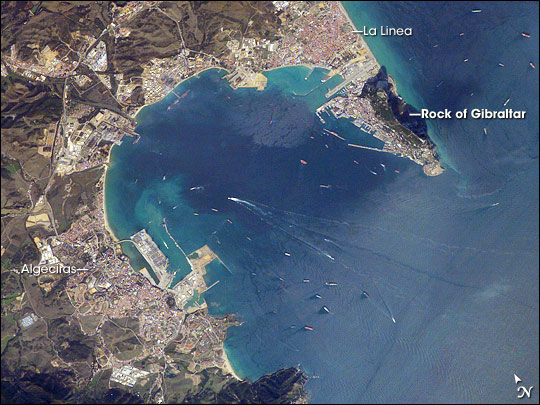
- Interactive map of Bay of Gibraltar
- Coordinates: 36°07′48″N 05°23′42″W
- River sources: Pícaro, Guadarranque, Río de Palmones, Río de la Miel
- Ocean/sea sources: Strait of Gibraltar, Alboran Sea, Mediterranean Sea, Atlantic Ocean
- Max. length: 10 km (6.2 mi)
- Max. width: 8 km (5.0 mi)
- Surface area: 75 km^{2} (29 sq mi)
- Max. depth: 400 m (1,300 ft)
- Settlements: Algeciras, La Línea de la Concepción, Gibraltar, Palmones, Puente Mayorga, Campamento

The Bay of Gibraltar, also known as Bay of Algeciras, is a bay at the southern end of the Iberian Peninsula. It is around 10 km (6.2 mi) long by 8 km (5.0 mi) wide, covering an area of some 75 km^{2} (29 sq mi), with a depth of up to 400 m (1,300 ft) in the centre of the bay. It opens to the south into the Strait of Gibraltar and the Mediterranean Sea.

The shoreline is densely settled. From west to east, the shore is divided between the Spanish municipalities of Algeciras, Los Barrios, San Roque, La Línea de la Concepción and the British Overseas Territory of Gibraltar. The larger part of the shoreline is Spanish territory, with part of the eastern half of the bay belonging to Gibraltar.

The east and west entrances to the bay are marked respectively by the Europa Point Lighthouse at Europa Point, Gibraltar and the Punta Carnero Lighthouse in Punta Carnero to the west of Algeciras.

The area around the Bay of Gibraltar has been inhabited for millennia and the bay itself has been used by merchant shipping for at least 3,000 years. The Phoenicians are believed to have had a settlement near Gibraltar and the Romans established the town of Portus Alba ("White Port") on the site of modern Algeciras. Later peoples, notably the Moors and the Spanish, also established settlements on the shoreline during the Middle Ages and early modern period, including the heavily fortified and highly strategic port at Gibraltar, which fell to England in 1704.

The bay's strategic position at the mouth of the Mediterranean has made it a much-contested body of water over the centuries. It has been the site of several major sea battles, notably the Battle of Gibraltar (1607) and the First Battle of Algeciras (1801). During the Second World War, Italy launched human torpedoes from Algeciras on several occasions in attempts to sink British ships moored in the Gibraltar harbour, with mixed success due to the work of Commander Crabbe.

More recently, there has been (and remains) a persistent dispute between Spain and Gibraltar over British sovereignty in the Bay of Gibraltar. Spain does not recognise British claims of sovereignty in the area save for a small portion around the Port of Gibraltar, but the UK has asserted a normal 3 nmi (5.6 km; 3.5 mi) limit around Gibraltar, with a demarcation in the middle of the bay. This claim contradicts the treaty of Utrecht of 1713, by which Spain ceded to Great Britain the city and port of Gibraltar and the internal waters of that port, without granting any territoriality over the surrounding waters in the bay by Algeciras. This has caused tensions between the two sides, especially over the issue of Spanish fishermen operating in British Gibraltar territorial waters. Both have signed, and are bound, by the United Nations Convention on the Law of the Sea which specifies territorial waters. After the arrest of a Spanish fishing vessel by the Royal Gibraltar Police in 1998, the problem largely subsided. An incident in the area in 2007 concerning the Odyssey Marine Exploration was resolved in court cases by 2012 with Spain being awarded the ownership of the treasure-trove.

== Ecology ==
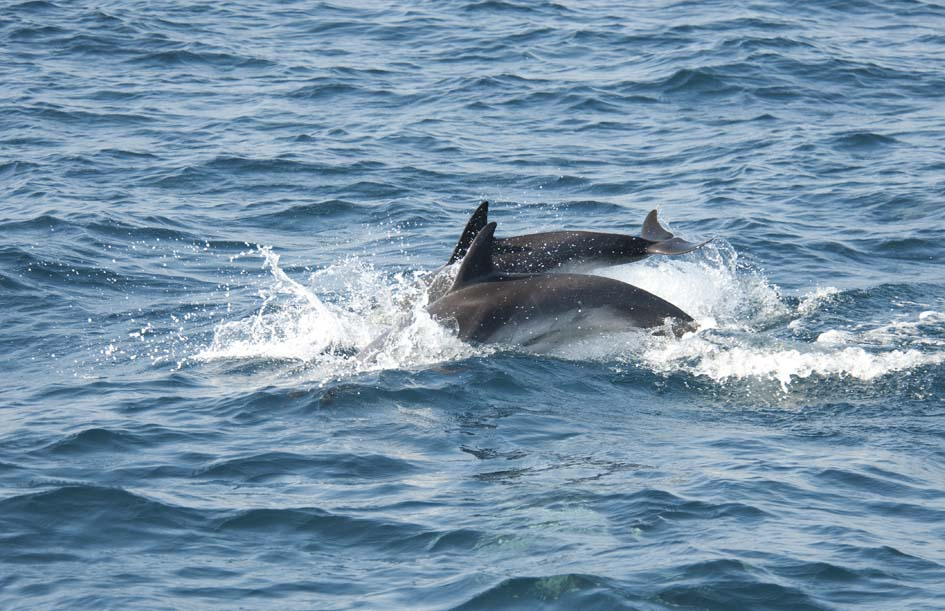
Common dolphins, Gibraltar area

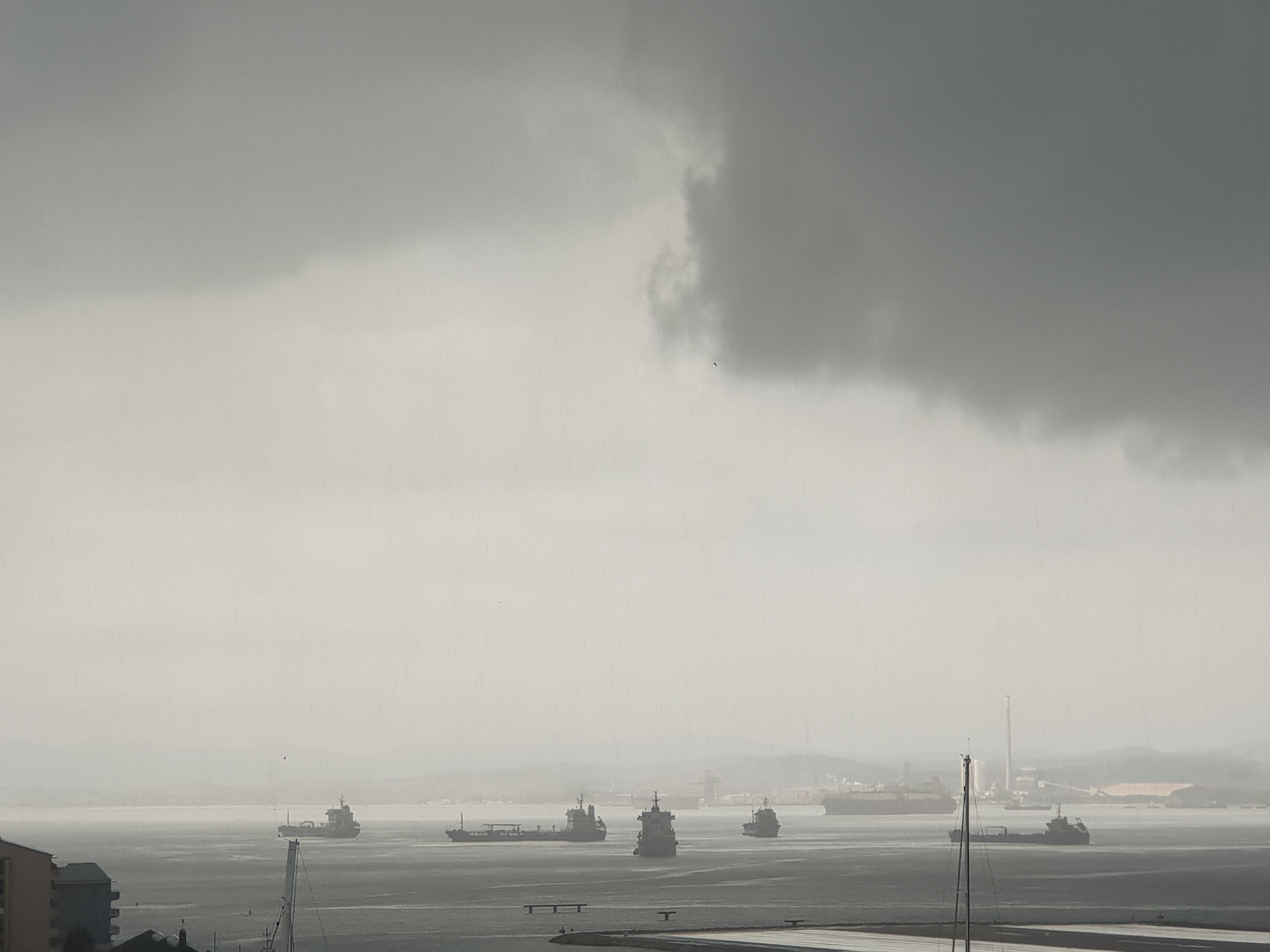
Bay of Gibraltar on a rainy day.

The bay is a breeding area for several dolphin species, notably the common dolphin, striped dolphin and bottlenose dolphin, and is also visited by migratory whales. It is a popular destination for tourist whale-watching trips from Algeciras or Gibraltar.

The other major draw for tourists is scuba diving: the area is rich with wrecks and historical artifacts such as crashed Avro Shackleton aircraft and Sherman tanks from the Second World War, and ancient anchors from Phoenician and Roman ships.

To encourage marine diversity an artificial reef was constructed in the bay at the end of the runway.

== Industrialisation ==
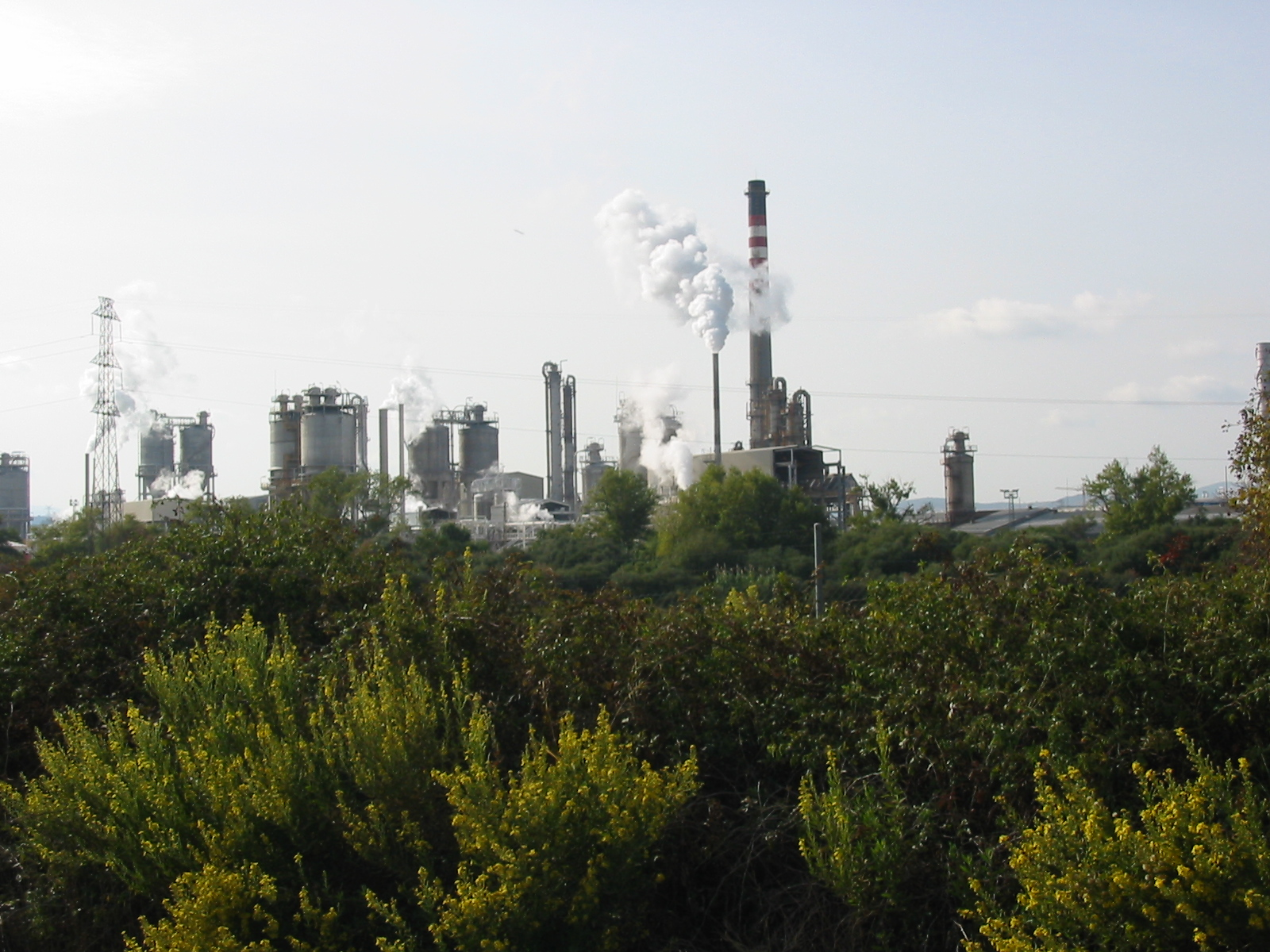
CEPSA oil refinery at San Roque.

The area around the bay in Spain is heavily industrialised with extensive petrochemical installations near San Roque (such as the CEPSA oil refinery and Acerinox stainless steel manufacturing plant) and working ports in both Algeciras and Gibraltar. The bay's waters are used by a considerable number of large and medium-sized ships, notably oil tankers and freighters. Oil bunkering activities are also heavily carried out.

=== CEPSA Refinery ===
The CEPSA Gibraltar-San Roque Refinery, located in Spain, occupies 1.5 million m^{2} and employs 1,000. In 2015 the refinery produced 13.8 million tons of fuel, 260,000 tons of purified terephthalic acid, 170,700 tons of purified isophthalic acid and 157,300 tons of polyethylene terephthalate.

In 2007 a particularly serious sulphur incident happened as well as intermittent flaring episodes. The impacts of such upsets on surrounding neighbourhoods had provoked outrage and public protest which led to the Consejería de Medio Ambiente of the Junta de Andalucía to order an independent audit aimed at investigating such incidents.

The refinery continues to cause concern with close co-operation between various groups monitoring its activities.

=== Bunkering ===
Fuel tanks on ships are known as bunkers, and the process of fueling termed bunkering.

Due to its geographical position on a major shipping route, Gibraltar is one of the largest bunkering ports in the Mediterranean, followed by neighbour Algeciras in Spain. The ports in the Straits — Algeciras, Ceuta and Gibraltar — are the second bunker market in Europe, behind the so-called Amsterdam-Rotterdam-Antwerp area.

In Gibraltar 4,300,000 t (4,700,000 short tons) of bunker fuel were delivered in 2007 compared with just 840,000 t (930,000 short tons) in 1990 and bunkering is now the main activity within the Port of Gibraltar. Of a total of 8,351 deep-sea vessels which called at Gibraltar in 2007, 5,640 were supplied with fuel.

Algeciras recorded bunker sales of about 2,400,000 t (2,600,000 short tons) in 2008. From the 24,535 vessels called at the Port of Algeciras Bay, 2,173 took on fuel. Gibraltar in 2009 supplied over 4,200,000 t (4,600,000 short tons) of fuel. The local CEPSA refinery produces supplies much of the fuel for bunkering in the bay which it delivers on seven dedicated barge to either Algeciras or Gibraltar.

== Pollution ==
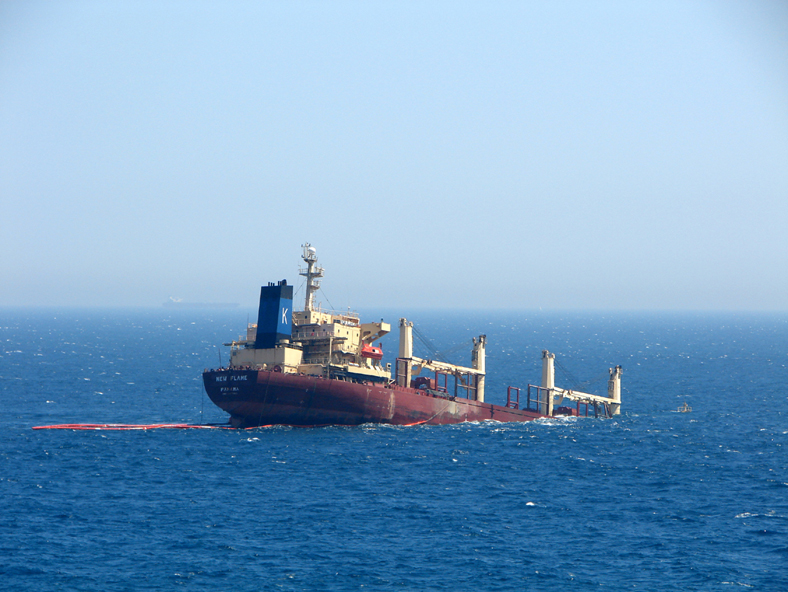
The New Flame sinking off Europa Point, 13 August 2007

Due to all these facts and the heavy industries along the shoreline, airborne and marine pollution are serious problems in the area. Environmental groups have raised concerns about the risks of oil spills and other types of pollution, particularly in the light of the bay's ecological importance. In May 1998, an accident at the Acerinox plant in Los Barrios, caused the release of a radioactive cloud. The radiation was not detected on site, but was eventually detected in France, Italy, Switzerland, Germany, and Austria. The radioactive levels measured were up to 142 times higher than normal. Due to the large number of ships that transit the strait, there is always a danger of accidents and in recent years there have been a small number of sinkings, groundings and collisions in both Gibraltar and Spain resulting in oil spills (New Flame, Spa Bunker IV, Samothraki, Sierra Nava, Tawe and Fedra).

Last report of Greenpeace on the pollution in Spain targets the Bay of Gibraltar as suffering from "chronic pollution" due to hydrocarbons, not only as a result of accidents, but also as a consequence of regular unballast, ship-to-ship bunkering or tank cleaning operations. During 2009, environmental organizations, both Spanish and Gibraltarian, have called the Tripartite Forum to implement measures to protect the Bay of Gibraltar.

A joint statement was issued by concerned environmental groups on both sides of the frontier in relation to the trilateral forum meeting held in 2009.

A report by the Gibraltar government in 2015 reported that the water body status of Gibraltar Coastal Waters was "good" for both ecological and chemical status.

== Archaeology ==
According to a 2026 report by CNN, Spanish archaeologists conducting an archaeological survey between 2020-2023 identified in the bay 151 underwater archaeological sites. the sites spreading over the 29-square mile bay, include 124 shipwrecks, from periods as early as the ancient Punic (Carthaginian) civilization to the modern period.
