= List of shipwrecks in January 1849 =

The list of shipwrecks in January 1849 includes ships sunk, foundered, wrecked, grounded, or otherwise lost during January 1849.

== 1 January ==
List of shipwrecks: 1 January 1849
Ship	State	Description
Dart	United Kingdom	The yawl foundered in the North Sea off Aldeburgh, Suffolk with the loss of four of the seven people on board.
Despina	Greece	The brig was abandoned in the Mediterranean Sea. Her crew were rescued by Bordeaux Packet (France).
Formosa	United Kingdom	The ship caught fire and was abandoned in the Atlantic Ocean. Her crew were rescued by Henry Winch (United Kingdom). Formosa was on a voyage from Pará, Brazil to London.
Hesperus	United Kingdom	The ship ran aground at Cardiff, Glamorgan. She was on a voyage from Cardiff to Whitby, Yorkshire.
Newport	United Kingdom	The ship ran aground and was damaged at Sunderland, County Durham. She was refloated but found to be leaky.
Sea Bird	United Kingdom	The ship ran aground on the Bowler Bank, in the English Channel off the coast of Sussex. She was on a voyage from South Shields, County Durham to Galway. She was refloated and resumed her voyage.

== 2 January ==
List of shipwrecks: January 1849
Ship	State	Description
Carl Richard	Greifswald	The ship ran aground at South Shields, County Durham, United Kingdom and was damaged. She was on a voyage from Greifswald to South Shields. She was refloated and taken in to South Shields in a leaky condition.
Circonstance	France	The full-rigged ship foundered in the Atlantic Ocean 40 leagues (120 nautical miles (220 km)) west of Cape Finisterre, Spain. Her crew were rescued by the galiot Voorwark (Netherlands).
Constant	United Kingdom	The brig was abandoned in the North Sea. Her crew survived. She was subsequently driven ashore at Happisburgh, Norfolk. She was on a voyage from Sunderland, County Durham to Cartagena, Spain. She was refloated on 26 January and towed in to Great Yarmouth, Norfolk.
Hugo	Stettin	The brig ran aground on the Gunfleet Sand, in the North Sea off the coast of Essex, United Kingdom before 5 February.
Lisbonnais	France	The ship was sighted off the "Malguire Islands" whilst on a voyage from Havre de Grâce, Seine-Inférieure to Lima, Peru. No further trace, presumed foundered with the loss of all hands.
Messenger	United Kingdom	The brig was wrecked on the Gunfleet or the Shipwash Sand, in the North Sea off the coast of Essex. Her eight crew were rescued. She was on a voyage from Sunderland to London.
Thetis	United Kingdom	The ship was wrecked on the Leman Sand, in the North Sea off the coast of Lincolnshire. Her crew were rescued. She was on a voyage from Königsberg, Prussia to Limerick.
William Jarvis	United Kingdom	The ship ran aground at New Orleans, Louisiana, United States. She was on a voyage from New Orleans to Liverpool, Lancashire.

== 3 January ==
List of shipwrecks: 3 January 1849
Ship	State	Description
James	United Kingdom	The ship was driven ashore in the Belfast Lough. She was on a voyage from Belfast to Newry, County Antrim. She was refloated and put back to Belfast in a leaky condition.
Jeune Marie	France	The chasse-marée was driven into Petronelle (Belgium) and was abandoned in Whitesand Bay. Her crew were rescued by Petronelle She subsequently drifted out to sea. Jeune Marie was subsequently taken in to the Isles of Scilly in a derelict condition.
Maria	Prussia	The ship was sighted in the Øresund whilst on a voyage from Königsberg to London, United Kingdom. No further trace, presumed foundered with the loss of all hands.
Oswald	Denmark	The ship was driven ashore at "Tiabbreng". She was on a voyage from Hull, Yorkshire, United Kingdom to Holbæk.
Pioneer	United Kingdom	The ship was abandoned in the Atlantic Ocean. All on board were rescued. She was on a voyage from Bristol, Gloucestershire to New Orleans, Louisiana, United States.

== 4 January ==
List of shipwrecks: 4 January 1849
Ship	State	Description
Cincinnati	United States	The ship was abandoned in the Atlantic Ocean off Faial Island, Azores. Her crew were rescued. She was on a voyage from Baltimore, Maryland to Dublin, United Kingdom.
Experiment	United Kingdom	The ship ran aground and was damaged on the Scroby Sands, Norfolk. She was refloated.
Skjald	Norway	The brigantine was wrecked on a reef in the Atlantic Ocean (34°57′30″S 56°05′00″W).

== 5 January ==
List of shipwrecks: 5 January 1849
Ship	State	Description
George Armstrong	United Kingdom	The ship was destroyed by fire in the Hooghly River. Her crew were rescued. She was on a voyage from Calcutta, India to Liverpool, Lancashire.
Grasshopper	United Kingdom	The ship ran aground on The Manacles. She was refloated and beached at Helford, Cornwall. She was on a voyage from Limerick to Truro, Cornwall.
Grecian	United Kingdom	The ship was damaged by fire at Malta.
Omega	United Kingdom	The ship was wrecked on Break Point, China with the loss of twelve of the 37 people on board. She was on a voyage from Hong Kong to another port in China.
Quicksilver	United Kingdom	The ship struck The Manacles. She was consequently beached at Helford, Cornwall. She was on a voyage from Cork to Truro and Southampton, Hampshire.
Saone	United States	The ship was driven ashore at Cape Florida, Florida. She was on a voyage from New Orleans, Louisiana to London, United Kingdom. She was refloated in late January or early February and resumed her voyage.

== 6 January ==
List of shipwrecks: 6 January 1849
Ship	State	Description
Cape Packet	United Kingdom	The ship was destroyed by fire at Penang, Malaya.

== 7 January ==
List of shipwrecks: 7 January 1849
Ship	State	Description
Genesee	United States	The barque ran aground on the Gingerbread Grounds. Her crew were rescued. She had become a wreck by 20 February.
Maria	United Kingdom	The schooner sank at Swansea, Glamorgan. Her crew were rescued. She was on a voyage from Pentreath, Cornwall to Swansea.

== 8 January ==
List of shipwrecks: 8 January 1849
Ship	State	Description
Blossom	United Kingdom	The ship was severely damaged at Aberdeen.
Ceylon	United Kingdom	The ship was wrecked in Ross Bay, County Cork. She was on a voyage from the River Clyde to New York, United States. Twenty-eight people were rescued, thirteen drowned.
Industrie	France	The ship ran aground and sank in the Seine. She was on a voyage from Rouen, Seine-Inférieure to London.
Lady Ridley	United Kingdom	The ship was in collision with another vessel and sank off the Nore. Her crew were rescued.
Mansfield	United Kingdom	The schooner was driven ashore and wrecked at Johnshaven, Aberdeenshire. Her crew were rescued.
Sarzeantin	France	The ship was driven ashore and sank at the mouth of the Laq. She was on a voyage from Swansea, Glamorgan, United Kingdom to La Rochelle, Charente-Maritime.
Union	United Kingdom	The schooner was driven ashore and wrecked at Aberdeen. Her five crew were rescued. She was on a voyage from Newcastle upon Tyne, Northumberland to Stonehaven, Aberdeenshire.
Venus	United Kingdom	The schooner struck the pier and ran aground at Aberdeen. She was on a voyage from Hartlepool to Aberdeen.
Victory	United Kingdom	The ship struck the Loughor Bridge, Llanelly, Glamorgan and sank. She was on a voyage from Aberystwyth to Spitty, Glamorgan.
Zwey Gebruder	Hamburg	The schooner was driven ashore and wrecked on Scharhörn.

== 9 January ==
List of shipwrecks: 9 January 1849
Ship	State	Description
Ada Alice	United Kingdom	The ship was abandoned in the Atlantic Ocean. Her crew were rescued by Harmony (United Kingdom). She was on a voyage from Liverpool, Lancashire to New York, United States.
Bon Père	United Kingdom	The ship was driven onto the Oyster Rocks, off Poole, Dorset, United Kingdom and was damaged. She was refloated on 12 January.
Buconnoc	United Kingdom	The ship struck the Culperd Rock in the Irish Sea and was damaged. She was on a voyage from Liverpool to Limerick She put in to Holyhead, Anglesey in a leaky condition.
Christina	United Kingdom	The schooner was wrecked on the West Hoyle Bank, in Liverpool Bay. Her crew were rescued by the tug Express (United Kingdom). Christina was on a voyage from Newry, County Antrim to Liverpool.
Dahlia	United Kingdom	The ship was driven ashore at Aberdeen. Her crew survived. Her crew survived. She was on a voyage from Newcastle upon Tyne, Northumberland to Arbroath, Forfarshire. She was refloated on 24 January and taken in to Aberdeen.
Deux Frères	United Kingdom	The brig was abandoned in the Atlantic Ocean. Her crew were rescued by Swordfish (United Kingdom). Deux Frères was on a voyage from New York to Havre de Grâce, Seine-Inférieure.
Diadem	United Kingdom	The ship ran aground and was damaged on the Burbo Bank, in Liverpool Bay. She was on a voyage from New York to Liverpool. She was refloated and taken in to Liverpool in a leaky condition.
Elizabeth	United Kingdom	The schooner was driven ashore and wrecked 1 nautical mile (1.9 km) north of Aberdeen with the loss of three of her five crew. She was on a voyage from Aberdeen to Leith, Lothian. She was refloated on 24 January and taken in to Aberdeen.
Gulph	United Kingdom	The ship was wrecked near Lymington, Hampshire. Her crew were rescued. She was on a voyage from Swanage, Dorset to London.
Hart	(United Kingdom of Great Britain and Ireland) Isle of Man	The schooner was driven ashore at Laxey.
Integrity	United Kingdom	The ship struck the Arklow Bank, in the Irish Sea off the coast of County Wicklow and sank. Her crew were rescued. She was on a voyage from Hartlepool, County Durham to Dublin.
Isabella	United Kingdom	The schooner was driven ashore and wrecked north of Aberdeen. Her crew were rescued by the Aberdeen Lifeboat. She was on a voyage from Riga, Russia to an Irish port.
Louise	France	The brig was driven ashore at Limerick.
Maria Sophie	Denmark	The schooner was wrecked on Skagen. Her crew were rescued She was on a voyage from Newcastle upon Tyne, Northumberland, United Kingdom to Holbæk.
Mary O'Neile	United Kingdom	The ship sprang a leak in the Irish Sea. She was taken in tow by the tug Diamond (United Kingdom) and was beached at Egremont, Lancashire. She was on a voyage from Newry to Liverpool.
Panama	United States	The ship was driven ashore at Limerick.
Witte Leeuw	Netherlands	The ship was driven ashore at Limerick. She was on a voyage from Rotterdam, South Holland to Limerick. She was refloated on 12 January but consequently sank.

== 10 January ==
List of shipwrecks: 10 January 1849
Ship	State	Description
Anna Maria	United Kingdom	The ship was wrecked near Holyhead, Anglesey with the loss of two of her crew. She was on a voyage from Liverpool, Lancashire to Dordrecht, South Holland, Netherlands.
Catherine, or Katherine	United Kingdom	The schooner was driven ashore near Peterhead, Aberdeenshire. Her crew were rescued by rocket apparatus. She was on a voyage from Newcastle upon Tyne, Northumberland to Aberdeen.
Charles	United Kingdom	The schooner was driven ashore at Formby, Lancashire.
Competitor	United Kingdom	The brig ran aground on a reef off Punta Mala, Spain. She was on a voyage from Livorno, Grand Duchy of Tuscany to Cork. She was refloated and resumed her voyage.
Douglas	(United Kingdom of Great Britain and Ireland) Isle of Man	The schooner was driven into Oneca (United Kingdom) and was consequently beached at Seacombe, Cheshire. She was refloated on 12 January and taken in to Liverpool.
Duchess of Gloucester	United Kingdom	The schooner was driven ashore and wrecked at Kilkeel, County Down. She was on a voyage from Glasgow, Renfrewshire to Gloucester.
Economy	United Kingdom	The ship was driven ashore at Porthdinllaen, Caernarfonshire. Her crew were rescued.
Effort	United Kingdom	The brig was wrecked near New Slains Castle, Aberdeenshire with the loss of all hands, about seven lives.
Fanny	United Kingdom	The schooner was driven ashore at "Traethsarth", Cardiganshire. She was on a voyage from Dublin to Gloucester. She was refloated on 12 January and taken in to New Quay, Cardiganshire.
Golden Eagle	United Kingdom	The ship collided with Emigrant and capsized at Seacombe, Cheshire. She was on a voyage from Nassau, Bahamas to Liverpool, Lancashire.
Harriet	United Kingdom	The barque was driven ashore in the Hilbre Islands, Cheshire. She was on a voyage from Liverpool to Constantinople, Ottoman Empire. She was refloated on 12 January and put back to Liverpool.
Helena	United Kingdom	The ship was abandoned in the Atlantic Ocean. Her crew were rescued by Virginian (United States). Helena was on a voyaged from New York, United States to Galway.
Hero	United Kingdom	The schooner was driven ashore, capsized and was wrecked near Peterhead with the loss of two of her crew. She was on a voyage from Sunderland, County Durham to Fraserburgh, Aberdeenshire.
Isabella	United Kingdom	The schooner was wrecked at the mouth of the River Ythan.
Janet	United Kingdom	The schooner was driven ashore at "Auchingale", Caithness. She was on a voyage from Port Gordon, Morayshire to Scrabster, Caithness.
London	United Kingdom	The schooner was driven ashore and wrecked at Peterhead. Her crew were rescued.
Margaret	United Kingdom	The brig ran aground on the Scroby Sands, in the North Sea off the coast of Norfolk. She was on a voyage from Poole, Dorset to Hull, Yorkshire. She was refloated and taken in to Great Yarmouth in a leaky condition.
Maria	United Kingdom	The ship was driven ashore and wrecked near Westport, County Mayo. Her crew were rescued. She was on a voyage from Liverpool, Lancashire to Galway.
Pauline	France	The ship was driven ashore in Tor Bay. She was on a voyage from Havre de Grâce, Seine-Inférieure to Martinique.
Pheasant	United Kingdom	The brig was driven ashore and wrecked in Duncan's Bay with the loss of three of her crew. She was on a voyage from South Shields, County Durham to Barbados.
Phœnix	United Kingdom	The sloop was driven ashore near Formby.
Prosperous	United Kingdom	The ship ran aground on the Herd Sand, in the North Sea off the coast of County Durham. She was refloated.
Scotsman	United Kingdom	The brig foundered in the North Sea off Buchan Ness, Aberdeenshire with the loss of all hands.
Soeridderen	Denmark	The ship was wrecked at "Wonlesser". Her crew were rescued. She was on a voyage from London, United Kingdom to Helsingør.
St. Pierre	France	The sloop ran aground on the Foreness Rock, Margate, Kent, United Kingdom. She was on a voyage from Honfleur, Calvados to London. She was refloated on 11 January and anchored off Kingsgate, Kent.
Vivid	United Kingdom	The Humber Keel was wrecked in Runswick Bay. Her crew were rescued.
Vorwarts	Prussia	The ship foundered in the Irish Sea off the coast of Lancashire, United Kingdom with the loss of all hands. She was on a voyage from Pillau to Liverpool, Lancashire.
William Oughtsted	United Kingdom	The ship was driven ashore at Deal, Kent. She was on a voyage from Great Yarmouth, Norfolk to Shoreham-by-Sea, Sussex. She was refloated and put in to Ramsgate, Kent.

== 11 January ==
List of shipwrecks: 11 January 1849
Ship	State	Description
Agnes Lee	United Kingdom	The brig was driven ashore, capsized and was wrecked at Cardigan with the loss of ten of the 14 people on board. She was on a voyage from Alexandria, Egypt to Liverpool, Lancashire.
Albion	United Kingdom	The lugger sank off North Foreland, Kent with the loss of all but one of her nine crew. She was going to the aid of a vessel in distress.
Ariel	United Kingdom	The ship capsized at Limerick.
Breeze	United Kingdom	The schooner was driven ashore at Rhyl, Denbighshire. She was on a voyage from Wicklow to Liverpool.
Caledonia	United Kingdom	The ship was driven ashore east of Whitstable, Kent. She was refloated on 24 January and taken in to Whitstable the next day.
Diana Grace, and Phœnix	United Kingdom	The ships collided in the English Channel off Dungeness, Kent and both sank. Their crews were rescued. Diana Grace was on a voyage from London to Liverpool. Phœnix was on a voyage from London to Hastings, Sussex.
Dolphin	(United Kingdom of Great Britain and Ireland) British North America	The ship was driven ashore at Cape Poge, Massachusetts, United States. She was on a voyage from Saint John, New Brunswick to New York. She was refloated and completed her voyage.
Grace	United Kingdom	The ship, a schooner or brig was beached at Sheerness, Kent. She was refloated and taken in to Sheerness.
Harriet	United Kingdom	The barque ran aground on the Middle Patch, in the Irish Sea off the coast of Denbighshire. She was refloated and taken in to the River Dee.
Jeune Aimée	France	The ship was driven ashore and wrecked at Rossbeigh, County Kerry, United Kingdom. Her crew were rescued. She was on a voyage from Bordeaux, Gironde to Cork, United Kingdom.
Jong Antonia	Belgium	The ship was in collision with a schooner and was beached at Fishguard, Pembrokeshire, United Kingdom.
La Louisa	France	The brig ran aground and was severely damaged at Limerick.
Lemiena	United Kingdom	The ship capsized at Limerick.
Liberal	United Kingdom	The ship ran aground on the West Bank, in the North Sea off the coast of Kent.
Liverpool	United Kingdom	The ship was driven ashore at Whitstable.
Mary, and Velocity	United Kingdom	Mary was in collision with Velocity in the North Sea off the coast of Suffolk. All bar Velocity's captain jumped aboard Mary, which subsequently came ashore at Pakefield. All on board were rescued. Mary was on a voyage from Sunderland, County Durham to London.
Mary Franks	United Kingdom	The ship was driven ashore at Grimsby, Lincolnshire. She was refloated.
Neva	United Kingdom	The sloop was wrecked at Granville, Manche, France with the loss of six of her nine crew, and also five would-be rescuers from Passe Partout (French Navy).
Oak	United Kingdom	The ship was driven ashore at Grimsby. She was refloated.
Palermo	United Kingdom	The barque was driven ashore at Hartlepool, County Durham. She was later refloated and towed in to the River Tyne.
Prosperous	United Kingdom	The ship ran aground on the Herd Sand, in the North Sea off the coast of County Durham. She was refloated.
Rapid	United Kingdom	The ship capsized at Limerick.
Rapid	United Kingdom	The ship ran aground on the Girdler Sand, in the North Sea off the coast of Kent. She was on a voyage from Galway to London. She was refloated and taken in to The Downs.
Robert and Mary	United Kingdom	The ship ran aground on the Maplin Sand, in the North Sea off the coast of Essex. She was refloated and put in to Sheerness, Kent.
Skea	United Kingdom	The ship was driven ashore at Angle, Pembrokeshire. She was on a voyage from Chepstow, Monmouthshire to Dublin.
Susan and Harry	United Kingdom	The ship was driven ashore at Grimsby. She was refloated.
Sylph	United Kingdom	The ship was driven ashore at Hartlepool. She was later refloated and towed in to the River Tyne.
Unity	United Kingdom	The two-masted schooner was wrecked at Port Seton, Lothian with the loss of two of her four crew. She was on a voyage from Clackmannan to the Moray Firth.
Virginie	France	The ship sank off Cherbourg, Seine-Inférieure. She was on a voyage from Lézardrieux, Côtes-du-Nord to Portsmouth, Hampshire, United Kingdom.
William and Mary	United Kingdom	The ship was driven ashore at Porthdinllaen, Caernarfonshire. She was on a voyage from Youghal, County Cork to Liverpool. She was refloated on 24 January and taken in to Porthdinllaen.
Williams	United Kingdom	The schooner was wrecked on the Cairn Rock, off the coast of Wigtownshire with the loss of all hands.

== 12 January ==
List of shipwrecks: 12 January 1849
Ship	State	Description
Alice	United Kingdom	The brig was abandoned in the Atlantic Ocean. Her crew were rescued by Walter R. Jones (United Kingdom). Alice was on a voyage from Baltimore, Maryland, United States to Galway.
Atlantic	United Kingdom	The ship was driven ashore at Ardrossan, Ayrshire. All on board, more than 400 people, were rescued by the steam tug Conqueror (United Kingdom). Atlantic was on a voyage from Liverpool, Lancashire to New Orleans, Louisiana, United States.
Boykett	United Kingdom	The ship was driven ashore at Formby, Lancashire with the loss of all hands. She was on a voyage from Bordeaux, Gironde to Liverpool, Lancashire.
Carlotta	United States	The barque capsized at Limerick, United Kingdom.
Enchantress	United Kingdom	The ship ran around on the Goodwin Sands, Kent. Her crew were rescued. She was on a voyage from Zakynthos, Greece to London. She was refloated and taken in to Ramsgate, Kent, where she arrived on 15 January.
European	United Kingdom	The ship ran aground on the Kattendyk. She was on a voyage from New Orleans, Louisiana, United States to Antwerp, Belgium. She was refloated and taken in to Antwerp.
Independence	United Kingdom	The ship ran aground on the Brake Sand, in the North Sea off the coast of Kent. She was on a voyage from Hartlepool, County Durham to Boulogne, Pas-de-Calais, France. She was refloated but consequently had to be beached on the Kent cost. She was subsequently taken in to Ramsgate, Kent.
John Quayle	(United Kingdom of Great Britain and Ireland) Isle of Man	The ship was wrecked near Parkgate, Cheshire.
Mary	United Kingdom	The ship was driven ashore at Lowestoft, Suffolk. Her crew were rescued.

== 13 January ==
List of shipwrecks: 13 January 1849
Ship	State	Description
Caledonia	United Kingdom	The ship ran aground on the Cross Sand, in the North Sea off the coast of Norfolk with the loss of three of her crew. She was on a voyage from London to Hartlepool, County Durham. She was refloated and taken in to Great Yarmouth, Norfolk, where she arrived on 15 January.
Catherine and Mary	United Kingdom	The flat was driven ashore at Rhyl, Denbighshire.
Dickey Sam	United Kingdom	The ship was driven ashore between Formby and Waterloo, Lancashire with the loss of three of her crew. She was on a voyage from Liverpool, Lancashire to Lima, Peru. She was refloated on 29 January with assistance from Defiance (United Kingdom).
Edmond	France	The ship was lost off Paraiab, Brazil. her crew were rescued. She was on a voyage from Havre de Grâce, Seine-Inférieure to Valparaíso, Chile.
Enigma	France	The sloop was lost in the English Channel off Dungeness, Kent, United Kingdom. Her crew were rescued.
Eugine	France	The ship was driven ashore in the Gulf of Saros. She was on a voyage from Xeros, Cyprus to Marseille, Bouches-du-Rhône.
RMS Forth	United Kingdom	The ship ran aground and was wrecked on the Alacranes, 70 nautical miles (130 km) off Cartagena, Republic of New Granada. All on board survived.
Friends	United Kingdom	The brig ran aground on the North Gar, in the North Sea off the coast of County Durham. She was on a voyage from the Clyde to Sunderland, County Durham.
Johannes Marinus	Netherlands	The ship was driven ashore at Dungeness. She was on a voyage from Batavia, Netherlands East Indies to a Dutch port. She was refloated.
Lord Hill	United Kingdom	The ship was driven ashore at Grimsby, Lincolnshire. She was on a voyage from Southampton, Hampshire to Sunderland. She was refloated and taken in to Grimsby.
Lucy	United Kingdom	The ship was driven ashore at South Foreland, Kent. She was on a voyage from Antigua to London. She was refloated and taken in to Ramsgate.
Newham	United Kingdom	The brig capsized at Limerick.
President	Belgium	The ship ran aground in the Willems Rek. She was on a voyage from Havana, Cuba to Antwerp.
Quiz	United Kingdom	The schooner was driven ashore in the Sea of Marmora at "Port Canary", Ottoman Empire, where she was wrecked. Her crew were rescued. She was on a voyage from Constantinople, Ottoman Empire to Cork or Falmouth, Cornwall.
Sir William Collings	United Kingdom	The ship was driven ashore on Guernsey, Channel Islands. Her crew were rescued. She was on a voyage from Guernsey to London.
Uneas	United States	The ship was driven ashore by ice in the Scheldt and capsized. She was on a voyage from Charleston, South Carolina to Antwerp, Belgium.

== 14 January ==
List of shipwrecks: 15 January 1849
Ship	State	Description
Cestrian	United Kingdom	The barque was abandoned in Cardigan Bay. She was subsequently driven ashore at Barmouth, Caernarfonshire. She was on a voyage from Bonny, Africa to Liverpool, Lancashire.
James Watt	United Kingdom	The paddle steamer ran aground on the Great Bank of Melsoorden. She was on a voyage from Antwerp, Belgium to London.

== 15 January ==
List of shipwrecks: 15 January 1849
Ship	State	Description
Alpine	(United Kingdom of Great Britain and Ireland) British North America	The ship was in collision with another vessel and was abandoned in the Atlantic Ocean. Her crew were rescued by Uriel (United Kingdom). Alpine was on a voyage from Halifax, Nova Scotia to an Irish port.
Amicizia	Brazil	The ship was attacked by local inhabitants off Guimarães, Maranhã. Her anchor ropes were cut. She was driven ashore, pillaged and subsequently wrecked. Her crew were rescued. She was on a voyage from Gibraltar to Rio de Janeiro.
Bonito	United Kingdom	The brig sprang a leak in the North Sea and subsequently foundered 2 nautical miles (3.7 km) north of the Haisborough Sands. Her crew survived. She was on a voyage from South Shields, County Durham to Maldon, Essex.
Humming Bird	(United Kingdom of Great Britain and Ireland) Bermuda	The ship was driven ashore and wrecked at Halifax, Nova Scotia, British North America. Her crew were rescued. She was on a voyage from Trinidad to Halifax.
Janet Gibson	United Kingdom	The ship was driven ashore and wrecked near "Klitmoller", Denmark. Her crew were rescued. She was on a voyage from Kirkcaldy, Fife to Königsberg or Memel, Prussia.

== 16 January ==
List of shipwrecks: 16 January 1849
Ship	State	Description
John and Alice	United Kingdom	The fishing smack departed from Liverpool, Lancashire for fishing grounds off the Isle of Man. Presumed subsequently run down and sunk with the loss of all six crew.
Victoria	United Kingdom	The schooner was in collision with the barque Pascoe Grenfell (United Kingdom) and foundered in the Bristol Channel off Port Eynon, Glamorgan. Her crew were rescued.
William	United Kingdom	The ship was driven ashore at Hurst Castle, Hampshire. She was on a voyage from London to Cádiz, Spain. She was refloated on 19 January and taken in to Yarmouth, Isle of Wight.

== 17 January ==
List of shipwrecks: 17 January 1849
Ship	State	Description
Arab	United Kingdom	The ship was driven ashore and wrecked at Zakynthos, United States of the Ionian Islands. She was on a voyage from Great Yarmouth, Norfolk to Cephalonia, United States of the Ionian Islands.
Leo	United Kingdom	The ship struck a sunken wreck on the Stamford Sand, in the North Sea and was damaged. She was on a voyage from Blyth, Northumberland to Havre de Grâce, Seine-Inférieure. She put in to Great Yarmouth, Norfolk in a leaky condition.
Milo	United Kingdom	The brig departed from Hull, Yorkshire for Grangemouth, Stirlingshire. No further trace. presumed foundered with the loss of all hands, possibly on 20 January.
Seagull	United Kingdom	The ship was driven ashore at Point Lynas, Anglesey. She was refloated but was abandoned and sank. She was on a voyage from Wexford to Liverpool, Lancashire.
Stadt Kolberg	Kolberg	The ship was driven ashore and sank on "Horsoe". Her crew were rescuedl She was on a voyage from London, United Kingdom to Stettin.
Theodor	Hamburg	The ship was wrecked on Heligoland. She was on a voyage from "Porto Plata" to Hamburg.

== 18 January ==
List of shipwrecks: 18 January 1849
Ship	State	Description
Britannia	United Kingdom	The ship was driven ashore and wrecked at "Ballyhealy", County Wexford. Her crew were rescued. She was on a voyage from Bristol, Gloucestershire to Barbados.
Franz	Stettin	The ship was driven ashore near "Vesterklit", Denmark. Her crew were rescued. She was on a voyage from Sunderland, County Durham, United Kingdom to Stettin.
Gem	United Kingdom	The ship was driven ashore and damaged at "Killeries", County Wexford. Her crew were rescued. She was on a voyage from New York to Galway. She was refloated on 21 January but had to be beached.
Retriever	United Kingdom	The ship ran aground and was damaged in the Sound of Scarp, Outer Hebrides. She was on a voyage from Saint John, New Brunswick, British North America to Dundee, Forfarshire. She was refloated on 4 May and resumed her voyage, but consequently put in to Londonderry in a leaky condition.
Rose in June	United Kingdom	The ship ran aground on the Trinity Sand, in the North Sea off the coast of Lincolnshire and sank. She was on a voyage from Wisbech, Cambridgeshire to Wakefield, Yorkshire. She was refloated and taken in to Grimsby, Lincolnshire.
Selvstændingheden	Denmark	The ship was lost off "Titterodderne" with the loss of two of her crew. She was on a voyage from Liverpool, Lancashire, United Kingdom to Aalesund.
Thomas	United Kingdom	The ship was driven ashore and severely damaged at Boulogne, Pas-de-Calais, France. She was on a voyage from Blyth, Northumberland to Boulogne. She was refloated the next day and taken in to Boulogne.
Veracity	United Kingdom	The schooner was driven ashore in the River South Esk. She was on a voyage from Dundee, Forfarshire to Leith, Lothian. She was refloated.

== 19 January ==
List of shipwrecks: 19 January 1849
Ship	State	Description
Faize	India	The ship was destroyed by fire. All 33 people on board took to the boats. They were rescued on 23 January by Maidstone (United Kingdom).
Menado	United Kingdom	The ship was wrecked in a hurricane at "Menao".
Proteus	United Kingdom	The brig ran aground on the Long Bank, in the Irish Sea off the coast of County Wexford. She floated off but consequently sank. Her crew were rescued. She was on a voyage from Liverpool, Lancashire to Newfoundland, British North America.

== 20 January ==
List of shipwrecks: 20 January 1849
Ship	State	Description
Armin	United Kingdom	The ship sprang a leak and was abandoned in The Downs. She was on a voyage from Neath, Glamorgan to Hamburg. She was subsequently beached near Sandown Castle, Kent. Armin was taken in to Ramsgate, Kent on 22 January.
Mantura	United Kingdom	The brig struck the North Rock, off the coast of County Antrim, and sank. Her crew were rescued. She was on a voyage from Leith, Lothian to Malta.
Ocean	United Kingdom	The steamship was driven ashore in the Clyde 8 nautical miles (15 km) downstream of Greenock, Renfrewshire. She was on a voyage from Greenock to Dublin.
Sea Nymph	(United Kingdom of Great Britain and Ireland) New Zealand	The ship was damaged by fire at Sydney, New South Wales.
Sophia	United Kingdom	The ship struck the pier and was beached at Ayr. She was on a voyage from Belfast, County Antrim to Ayr. She was refloated on 27 January and taken in to Ayr.
Victoria	United Kingdom	The ship ran aground on the Gunfleet Sand, in the North Sea off the coast of Essex. She was refloated and resumed her voyage.

== 21 January ==
List of shipwrecks: 21 January 1849
Ship	State	Description
Adventure	United Kingdom	The ship was driven ashore in Lough Foyle.
Heir Apparent	United Kingdom	The ship was driven ashore at Kilrush, County Clare. She was on a voyage from Liverpool, Lancashire to Limerick. She was refloated on 29 January.
Invincible	Trieste	The brig was driven ashore and wrecked at Cullenstown, County Wexford, United Kingdom. She was on a voyage from Constantinople, Ottoman Empire to Cork, United Kingdom.
Kate	(United Kingdom of Great Britain and Ireland) New Zealand	The schooner struck rocks at Open Bay, on the South Island's West Coast, New Zealand, with the loss of one crew member.
Nancy	United Kingdom	The ship was wrecked on the Isle of May, Fife with the loss of a crew member.
Norna	United Kingdom	The schooner was driven ashore at Limekilns, Fife. Her crew were rescued. She was on a voyage from Aberdeen to Charleston, South Carolina, United States.
Porteous	United Kingdom	The ship ran aground on the Long Bank Sand, in the Irish Sea off the coast of County Wexford. She floated off and consequently foundered. Her crew were rescued. Her crew were rescued. She was on a voyage from Liverpool, Lancashire to Newfoundland, British North America.
Unicorn	United Kingdom	The paddle steamer collided with the steamship Rob Roy (United Kingdom and sank in the North Sea 50 nautical miles (93 km) off the Newarp Lightship ( Trinity House ). Her crew were rescued by Rob Roy. Unicorn was on a voyage from Hull, Yorkshire to Antwerp, Belgium.

== 22 January ==
List of shipwrecks: 22 January 1849
Ship	State	Description
Alexander	United Kingdom	The ship was driven ashore and wrecked on Beynis Island, Valentia Harbour, County Cork. Her crew were rescued. She was on a voyage from Porto, Portugal to Cork.
Great Britain	United Kingdom	The barque was driven ashore by ice in the Delaware River. She was on a voyage from Philadelphia, Pennsylvania, United States to an Irish port. She was refloated and put back to Philadelphia for repairs.
Jeune Anyse	France	The schooner was in collision with Augusta ( Stralsund) and was abandoned in the English Channel off the coast of Pas-de-Calais. She was on a voyage from London, United Kingdom to Caen, Calvados. Jeune Anyse was towed in to Ramsgate, Kent, United Kingdom on 25 January.
Napoleon	Norway	The ship was wrecked on the Jadder Bank, in the North Sea with the loss of two of her crew.
Pheasant	(United Kingdom of Great Britain and Ireland) British North America	The ship was driven ashore on Goose Island. She was on a voyage from Saint John's, Newfoundland to Saint John, New Brunswick
Tigress	United Kingdom	The East Indiaman was driven ashore and wrecked west of the Shakespeare Cliff, near Dover, Kent. All on board were rescued. She was on a voyage from Ceylon to London. The local inhabitants plundered the wreck.

== 23 January ==
List of shipwrecks: January 1849
Ship	State	Description
Albertina	Prussia	The ship was wrecked at Memel. Her crew were rescued. She was on a voyage from Memel to Portsmouth, Hampshire, United Kingdom.
Alpine	(United Kingdom of Great Britain and Ireland) British North America	The ship was in collision with another vessel in the Atlantic Ocean. She was abandoned the next day. Her crew were rescued by Uriel (United States). Alpine was on a voyage from New York, United States to an Irish port.
Courier	United Kingdom	The schooner was driven ashore at Beckfoot, Cumberland. She was on a voyage from Pentewan, Cornwall to Liverpool, Lancashire.
Hanna and Marie	Denmark	The ship foundered off Fotö, Sweden with the loss of three of her five crew. She was on a voyage from Leith, Lothian, United Kingdom to Copenhagen.
Hymen	Prussia	The ship was driven ashore on "Homum". Her crew were rescued. She was on a voyage from Newcastle upon Tyne, Northumberland, United Kingdom to Hamburg.
Marys	United Kingdom	The brig was driven out to sea from Souter Point, County Durham. She was subsequently taken in to Middlesbrough, North Riding of Yorkshire, where she arrived on 29 January.
Norma	Portugal	The barque was wrecked at the mouth of the Douro. All on board were rescued. She was on a voyage from Porto to Rio de Janeiro, Brazil.
Velocity	(United Kingdom of Great Britain and Ireland) British North America	The ship was driven ashore and wrecked between the mouths of the Guadarranque and the Palmones. She was on a voyage from Saint John's, Newfoundland to Valencia, Spain. Velocity was consequently condemned.

== 24 January ==
List of shipwrecks: 24 January 1849
Ship	State	Description
Argonaut	Bremen	The ship was wrecked on Düne, Heligoland. Her crew were rescued. She was on a voyage from New York, United States to Bremen.
Benjamin Scott	United Kingdom	The ship was driven ashore near Saltfleet, Lincolnshire. She was on a voyage from London to Goole, Yorkshire.
Dorothea	Bremen	The ship was wrecked on Heligoland. Her crew were rescued.
Elizabeth	United Kingdom	The brig ran aground on the Boulmer Rocks, Northumberland. She was refloated but was again driven ashore and wrecked.
Elizabeth and Sarah	United Kingdom	The schooner was wrecked on the Rhomigyr Rocks, off the coast of Anglesey. She was on a voyage from Cork to Bangor, Caernarfonshire.
Hugh	United Kingdom	The brig was driven ashore in Derryoge Bay, County Down. Her crew were rescued. She was on a voyage from Dublin to Trinidad.
Julia	United Kingdom	The ship was abandoned off the Farne Islands, Northumberland. Her crew were rescued by Wanderer (United Kingdom). Julia was on a voyage from Aberdeen to Sunderland, County Durham.
Reform	United Kingdom	The crewless smack was driven out to sea from the Belfast Lough. She was on a voyage from Inverness to Dublin. Reform was towed in to Whitehaven, Cumberland on 25 January.
Rover	United Kingdom	The ship was wrecked 2 nautical miles (3.7 km) west of Boulogne, Pas-de-Calais, France. She was on a voyage from Portsmouth, Hampshire to Great Yarmouth, Norfolk.

== 25 January ==
List of shipwrecks: 25 January 1849
Ship	State	Description
Britannia	United Kingdom	The ship ran aground on the Wicklow Banks, in the Irish Sea. She was on a voyage from Wexford to Preston, Lancashire.
Ceres	United Kingdom	The ship foundered in the North Sea off Lowestoft, Suffolk with the loss of a crew member. Survivors were rescued by the brig Beta ( Grand Duchy of Oldenburg). Ceres was on a voyage from Sunderland, County Durham to Southampton, Hampshire.
Eirion	United Kingdom	The sloop was driven ashore near Holywood, County Down. She was on a voyage from Glasgow, Renfrewshire to Dublin. She was refloated on 26 January and taken in to Belfast, County Antrim for repairs.
Leander	United Kingdom	The ship ran aground at Vila Nova de Portimão, Portugal. Her crew were rescued.
Mate	(United Kingdom of Great Britain and Ireland) New Zealand	The ship was wrecked in the Open Bay Islands with the loss of a crew member.
Revenge	United Kingdom	The brigantine foundered in the North Sea off Flamborough Head, Yorkshire. Her crew had been taken off previously by the galiot Neptune (Kingdom of Hanover). She was on a voyage from Newcastle upon Tyne, Northumberland to Southampton, Hampshire.
Sirion	United Kingdom	The sloop was driven ashore near Holywood. She was on a voyage from Glasgow, Renfrewshire to Dublin.

== 26 January ==
List of shipwrecks: 26 January 1849
Ship	State	Description
Charles Fleming	United Kingdom	The ship was run aground in Prince's Bay, Tobago and was damaged. She was on a voyage from London to Tobago.
James and Elizabeth	United Kingdom	The ship was driven ashore and wrecked at Skinburness, Cumberland. Her crew were rescued. She was on a voyage from Maryport, Cumberland to Belfast, County Antrim.
Naples	United Kingdom	The ship was driven ashore at "Aberfeoll", Pembrokeshire. She was on a voyage from Boston, Lincolnshire to Dublin.
Nathanis	United States	The brig was in collision with another vessel and capsized with the loss of five of the eight people on board. Survivors were rescued by the schooner Winesota (United States). Nathanis was on a voyage from New Orleans, Louisiana to Boston, Massachusetts.
Rebecca	United Kingdom	The brig foundered in the Atlantic Ocean off Cape St. Vincent, Portugal. Her crew were rescued by the barque Harmonie (Russia).
Sophie Maria	Denmark	The ship was wrecked on a reef north west of "Vaederoe". She was on a voyage from Hull, Yorkshire, United Kingdom to Marstal.

== 27 January ==
List of shipwrecks: 27 January 1849
Ship	State	Description
Angler	United Kingdom	The ship ran aground on the Gunfleet Sands, in the North Sea off the coast of Essex. She was refloated and made for Harwich, Essex but consequently sank. Her crew were rescued. Angler was on a voyage from Dundee, Forfarshire to London.
Appoline	United Kingdom	The barque was driven ashore at Gibraltar. She was on a voyage from Gibraltar to Jamaica. She was refloated with assistance from HMS Polyphemus (Royal Navy).
Arcadian	United Kingdom	The ship ran aground on the North Bull, in the Irish Sea. She was refloated the next day and taken in to Dundalk, County Louth.
Archibald	Prussia	The barque was wrecked on the Big Scaurs Rocks, in the Bay of Luce. Three of her crew were rescued, eight took to a boat.
Ernaad	United Kingdom	The ship was driven ashore and damaged in the Whitby Passage. She was on a voyage from Moulmein, Burma to Calcutta, India. She was refloated on 6 March.
Jacques Laffitte	France	The ship was wrecked near "Poulequien". Her crew were rescued. She was on a voyage from Marennes, Charente-Maritime to Bristol, Gloucestershire, United Kingdom.
John Gilpin	(United Kingdom of Great Britain and Ireland) British North America	The schooner was wrecked on the Second Bocas. Her crew were rescued.
Lady Kenmare	United Kingdom	The ship was wrecked in the Firth of Clyde. Her crew were rescued. She was on a voyage from the Clyde to Bristol, Gloucestershire.
Scamander	(United Kingdom of Great Britain and Ireland) New South Wales	The brig was wrecked on a reef off the Isle of Pines, New Caledonia with the loss of seventeen of her 21 crew.
Unicorn	United Kingdom	The sloop collided with the clipper Nonsuch (United Kingdom) and sank in the Swin, off the coast of Essex with the loss of all but her captain from her four crew. She was on a voyage from Hull, Yorkshire to the River Thames.

== 28 January ==
List of shipwrecks: 28 January 1849
Ship	State	Description
Brooke	United Kingdom	The ship was wrecked on Tenerife, Canary Islands with the loss of a crew member. She was on a voyage from Bonny, Africa to Liverpool, Lancashire.
Dracut	United States	The ship was driven ashore at "Nauset". She was on a voyage from Machias, Maine to Madeira.
Iris, or Trio	United Kingdom	The ship struck rocks and sank off Wexford. Her crew were rescued. She was on a voyage from Constantinople, Ottoman Empire to Wexford.
Perseverance	United Kingdom	The schooner was driven ashore and wrecked at St. Leonard's-on-Sea, Sussex. Her crew were rescued.

== 29 January ==
List of shipwrecks: 29 January 1849
Ship	State	Description
Abraham	United Kingdom	The ship ran aground on the Shipwash Sand, in the North Sea off the coast of Suffolk. She was refloated and taken in to Handfleet Water.
Achilles	United Kingdom	The ship was driven ashore and wrecked near Staithes, Yorkshire. Her crew were rescued.
Admiral Hood	United Kingdom	The ship was driven ashore at Bridlington, Yorkshire.
Barbara	United Kingdom	The ship struck rocks in Gun's Island Bay. She was refloated and put back to Strangford, County Antrim.
Bee	United Kingdom	The ship was driven ashore south of Hartlepool, County Durham.
Compton	United Kingdom	The abandoned ship was driven ashore and wrecked on Vatersay, Outer Hebrides.
Cubana	United Kingdom	The ship ran aground on the Barrow Sand, in the North Sea off the coast of Norfolk. She was on a voyage from Hartlepool, County Durham to London. She was refloated and put in to Great Yarmouth, Norfolk.
Defiance	United Kingdom	The paddle tug ran aground in Bootle Bay whilst going to the assistance of Dickey Sam (United Kingdom). She was refloated.
Donegal	United Kingdom	The schooner was driven ashore and severely damaged at Redcar, Yorkshire. Her crew were rescued. She was on a voyage from London to Middlesbrough, Yorkshire. She was refloated on 3 February and towed in to Middlesbrough, Yorkshire.
Gulanre	United Kingdom	The ship capsized at Lerwick, Shetland Islands.
Hope	United Kingdom	The ship was in collision with Chili (United Kingdom) in the North Sea off Flamborough Head, Yorkshire. Her crew were rescued. She came ashore at Hornsea, Yorkshire. She drove ashore the next day 14 nautical miles (26 km) south of Bridlington, Yorkshire.
Laurel	United Kingdom	The schooner was wrecked at Stornoway, Isle of Lewis, Outer Hebrides. Her crew were rescued. She was on a voyage from Newcastle upon Tyne, Northumberland to Dublin.
Luck's All	United Kingdom	The ship foundered in the North Sea off the coast of Lincolnshire. Her crew were rescued.
Mary Clark	United Kingdom	The brig was driven ashore near Seaton Snook, County Durham. She was refloated on 5 February and towed in to Sunderland, County Durham.
Pallion Castle	United Kingdom	The brig was driven ashore at Redcar. Her crew were rescued. She was on a voyage from London to Sunderland, County Durham.
Planter	United Kingdom	The ship foundered in the Atlantic Ocean. Her crew were rescued by Richard N. Parker (United Kingdom). Planter was on a voyage from Odesa to Falmouth, Cornwall.
Richmond Hill	United Kingdom	The ship was driven ashore near Skinningrove, Yorkshire with the loss of her captain. She was on a voyage from London to Sunderland or Seaham, County Durham.
Ringmahon Castle	(United Kingdom of Great Britain and Ireland) Jersey	The barque was driven ashore at Redcar. Her crew were rescued. She was on a voyage from Jersey to Newcastle upon Tyne, Northumberland.
Sarah	United Kingdom	The ship was driven ashore south of Hartlepool.
Sophia	United Kingdom	The ship was run into by William (United Kingdom) and was severely damaged. She was on a voyage from Hartlepool, County Durham to Plymouth, Devon. She was assisted in to Lowestoft, Suffolk.
Tennant	United Kingdom	The ship was driven ashore near Whitby, Yorkshire. She was refloated on 5 February and taken in to Whitby.
Vest	United Kingdom	The brig was driven ashore at Seaton Carew, County Durham. She was refloated on 5 February and taken in to Hartlepool.
Vintage	United Kingdom	The ship was driven ashore at Redcar. Her crew were rescued. She was on a voyage from London to South Shields, County Durham.
Violet	United Kingdom	The ship was driven ashore south of Hartlepool. She was refloated on 31 January.
William Packet	United Kingdom	The ship was driven ashore south of Hartlepool.

== 30 January ==
List of shipwrecks: 30 January 1849
Ship	State	Description
Baron Escheles	Greece	The barque was driven ashore and severely damaged at South Shields, County Durham, United Kingdom. Her crew were rescued by the South Shields Lifeboat. She was on a voyage from Antwerp, Belgium to South Shields. She was refloated on 20 February.
Breeze	(United Kingdom of Great Britain and Ireland) New South Wales	The ship was sighted off Cape Upstart whilst on a voyage from Sydney to Keppel Bay. No further trace, presumed foundered with the loss of all hands.
Hope	United Kingdom	The ship was driven ashore and wrecked in the Bay of Luce. her crew were rescued. She was on a voyage from Maryport, Cumberland to Belfast, County Antrim.
Jason	United Kingdom	The ship ran aground at King's Lynn, Norfolk.
John	United Kingdom	The ship was driven ashore and wrecked north of Geron Head. Her crew were rescued. She was on a voyage from Troon, Ayrshire to Belfast, County Antrim.
New Concord	United Kingdom	The brig was driven ashore and severely damaged at South Shields. She was on a voyage from Sunderland, County Durham to London. She was later refloated and towed in to South Shields.
Penelope	(United Kingdom of Great Britain and Ireland) British North America	The ship was wrecked at St. Shott's, Nova Scotia. Her crew were rescued. She was on a voyage from Sydney, Nova Scotia to New York, United States.
Scio	United Kingdom	The ship ran aground on the Kentish Knock. She was on a voyage from Newcastle upon Tyne, Northumberland to Havre de Grâce, Seine-Inférieure, France. She was refloated and taken in to Ramsgate, Kent in a leaky condition.
Shakespeare	United Kingdom	The ship ran aground on the Herd Sand, in the North Sea off the coast of County Durham. She was on a voyage from Agrigento, Sicily to South Shields. She was refloated and taken into South Shields in a waterlogged condition.
Tay	United Kingdom	The sloop foundered off St. Abb's Head, Berwickshire. Her crew were rescued. Both crew were rescued by the sloop Rose (United Kingdom). Tay was on a voyage from South Shields to Bo'ness, Lothian.

== 31 January ==
List of shipwrecks: 31 January 1849
Ship	State	Description
Aimable	United Kingdom	The ship was wrecked in Carmarthen Bay.
Juno	United Kingdom	The ship was lost off Flamborough Head, Yorkshire. Her crew were rescued.
Lady Constable	United Kingdom	The ship ran aground off Broom Hill, County Waterford. She was on a voyage from Baltimore, Maryland, United States to Waterford. She was refloated and taken in to Waterford.
Pioneer	United Kingdom	The ship foundered in the Atlantic Ocean. All on board were rescued. She was on a voyage from Bristol, Gloucestershire to New Orleans, Louisiana, United States.

== Unknown date ==
List of shipwrecks: Unknown date in January 1849
Ship	State	Description
Achilles	Greece	The ship was driven ashore and wrecked at "Porto Camares", Ottoman Empire.
Amiral Miami	France	The lugger foundered before 11 January. Her crew were rescued by Leon (United Kingdom).
Avenir	France	The ship was wrecked near Lannion, Côtes-du-Nord before 12 January. She was on a voyage from Nantes, Loire-Inférieure to a British port.
Blarney	United Kingdom	The ship foundered in the Irish Sea before 25 January.
Comet	United Kingdom	The ship was in collision with Midlothian (United Kingdom) and foundered in the Atlantic Ocean before 12 January. Her crew were rescued by North Ash (United Kingdom). Comet was on a voyage from Ramsgate, Kent to São Miguel Island, Azores.
Elisia	Greece	The ship was wrecked at the Isola Sant' Andrea Lighthouse, Gallipoli.
Emma and Louise	Netherlands	The ship was wrecked on the Goodwin Sands, Kent with the loss of all on board. She was on a voyage from Batavia, Netherlands East Indies to Amsterdam, North Holland.
Finland	United Kingdom	The ship was driven ashore near Gallipoli, Ottoman Empire before 2 January. She was on a voyage from Odesa to Cork or Falmouth, Cornwall. She was refloated and taken in to Syra, Greece in a leaky condition.
Francis	United Kingdom	The schooner was driven ashore in the Sound of Criska. She was on a voyage from Liverpool, Lancashire to Ballina, County Mayo.
Friends	United Kingdom	The brig was driven ashore near Hartlepool, County Durham before 13 January. She was on a voyage from the Clyde to Sunderland, County Durham.
Gem	United States	The whaler was wrecked on one of the uncharted Suwarrow reef's. There were no deaths and after 21 days repairing the whaleboats on a sand bank they sailed to Upia.
Harmonie	France	The ship was lost at the mouth of the Loire before 8 January.
Hudson	Bremen	The ship was lost off the mouth of the Weser before 18 January. Her crew were rescued by the wherry Bremen (Bremen). Hudson was on a voyage from Puerto Rica to Hamburg.
John and Elizabeth	United Kingdom	The ship was driven ashore at Bideford, Devon. She was refloated on 8 January.
Lady Adelaide	United Kingdom	The ship was wrecked on the Colorado Reef before 22 January. She was on a voyage from British Honduras to Cork.
Lady Sale	United Kingdom	The ship was driven ashore on Long Island, New York, United States before 23 January. She was on a voyage from Kingston, Jamaica to New York City. She was refloated on 25 January and towed in to New York City.
Lena	(United Kingdom of Great Britain and Ireland) British North America	The ship was driven ashore on Saint John, Virgin Islands between 29 January and 1 February. She was on a voyage from Saint John's, Newfoundland to Barbados
Marie Rose	France	The ship was destroyed by fire in the North Sea. Her crew were rescued. She was on a voyage from Newcastle upon tyne, Northumberland, United Kingdom to Dieppe, Seine-Inférieure.
Mary	United Kingdom	The ship was wrecked at Augusta, Sicily before 5 January. Her crew were rescued. She was on a voyage from Alexandria, Egypt to Cork.
Montbars	Spain	The brig was wrecked on the coast of Spain.
Pollux	Denmark	The ship was driven ashore by ice in the Delaware River. She was on a voyage from Buenos Aires, Argentina to Philadelphia, Pennsylvania, United States. She was later refloated and taken in to Philadelphia in a severely damaged condition.
River Chief	(United Kingdom of Great Britain and Ireland) New South Wales	The ship ran aground at the mouth of the Yarra River before 4 January.
Quebec Packet	United Kingdom	The ship was driven ashore near New Quay, Cardiganshire before 15 January. She was on a voyage from Limerick to Bristol Gloucestershire.
Resoluto	Austrian Empire	The brig was abandoned in the Mediterranean Sea before 11 January. She was on a voyage from Constantinople, Ottoman Empire to Trieste. She was subsequently towed in to Augusta, Sicily by an English ship.
Skylark	United Kingdom	The ship ran aground on the Shipwash Sand before 12 February.
Sophia and Susanna	United Kingdom	The ship was wrecked at Civitavecchia, Papal States. Her crew were rescued. She was on a voyage from Civitavecchia to Messina, Sicily.
Standard	United Kingdom	The ship was lost off Martinique between 1 and 10 January with some loss of life. She was on a voyage from Demerara, British Guiana to Liverpool.
Telemacho	Flag unknown	The ship was wrecked on a reef in the Sea of Marmora. Her crew were rescued. She was on a voyage from Odesa to the Ionian Islands or Malta.
Thekla	Denmark	The ship was driven ashore and wrecked on Skagen before 3 January. She was on a voyage from Aarhus to an English port.
William	United Kingdom	The schooner was driven ashore and wrecked at "Airies", Wigtownshire with the loss of all hands.
