= Torre del Arroyo del Lobo =

Coordinates: 36°05′26″N 5°27′14″W

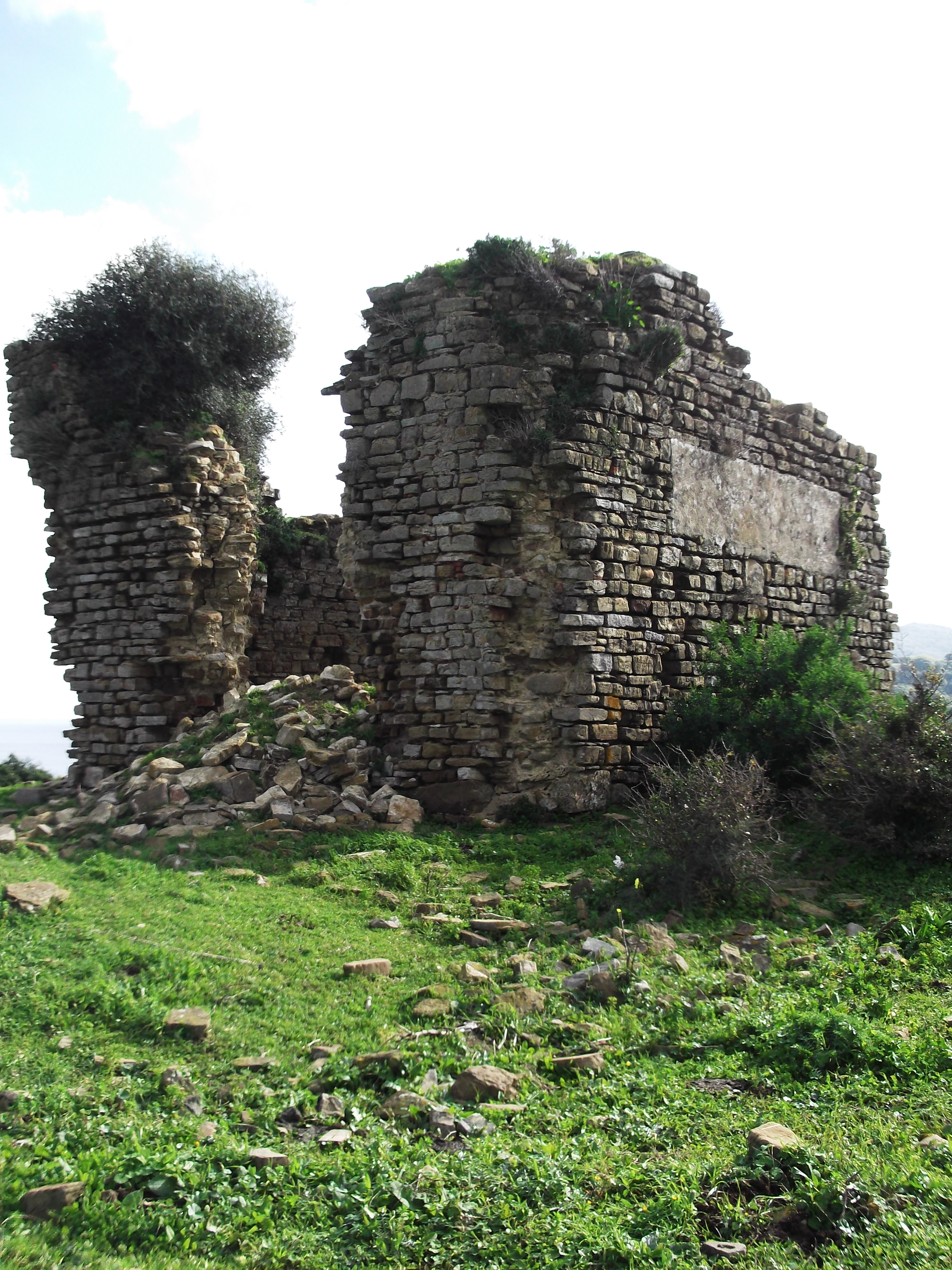

- Location within Spain
- Location: Algeciras, Spain

Spanish Cultural Heritage
- Official name: Torre del Arroyo del Lobo
- Type: Non-movable
- Criteria: Monument
- Designated: 1985

Torre del Arroyo del Lobo is a ruined medieval defensive tower near Algeciras, Spain. It is located in the cove of Getares, and monitored the stretch of coast from Punta Carnero to Punta de San García between the cities of Algeciras and Tarifa as part of the defensive system of the Strait of Gibraltar in the Middle Ages.

The tower is situated as 76.3 meters above sea level and 935 meters from the coast. Río Pícaro flows nearby. The building is rectangular with about 8 feet at maximum length. It must have reached 13 meters high, but today, in its ruined state, does not exceed six meters. Two floors and the basement are accessible through stairs. It became protected in 1985 as a Bien de Interés Cultural site.
