= List of shipwrecks in February 1866 =

The list of shipwrecks in February 1866 includes ships sunk, foundered, grounded, or otherwise lost during February 1866.

== 1 February ==
List of shipwrecks: 1 February 1866
Ship	State	Description
George	United Kingdom	The schooner struck the quayside at North Shields, Northumberland and was damaged. She was on a voyage from Great Yarmouth, Norfolk to North Shields.
Manolo	Bremen	The ship ran aground on the Haaks Bank, in the North Sea off the coast of Zeeland. She was on a voyage from St. Jago de Cuba, Cuba to Bremen. She was refloated on 3 February and towed in to Amsterdam, North Holland, Netherlands.
Margaret	United Kingdom	The tug sank at North Shields, Northumberland.
Nymphen	United Kingdom	The ship was damaged by fire at North Shields, Northumberland.
Valetta	United Kingdom	The barque ran aground in the Suriname River. She was on a voyage from Liverpool, Lancashire to the Surniname River.

== 2 February ==
List of shipwrecks: 2 February 1866
Ship	State	Description
Abalon	United Kingdom	The ship was wrecked near Small Point, Newfoundland, British North America. She was on a voyage from Queenstown, County Cork to Saint John's, Newfoundland.
Jeddo	United Kingdom	The steamship was wrecked on the Choui Kader Shoal. All on board were rescued. She was on a voyage from Hong Kong to Bombay, India.

== 3 February ==
List of shipwrecks: 3 February 1866
Ship	State	Description
Isabella Hunter	United Kingdom	The ship departed from Paisley, Renfrewshire for Belfast, County Antrim. Subsequently sighted off the Mull of Galloway, Argyllshire, but never reached her destination. Presumed foundered with the loss of all hands, a wrecked boat from the ship washed up at Portmuck, County Antrim.
Monarch	United Kingdom	The schooner was driven ashore and wrecked at Zuydcoote, Nord, France. Her crew were rescued. She was on a voyage from Hamburg to Bristol, Gloucestershire.
Thomas and Alice	United Kingdom	The schooner was driven ashore and Hartlepool, County Durham. She was refloated.
Union	United Kingdom	The schooner was abandoned 8 to 10 nautical miles (15 to 19 km) off St. Ives Head, Cornwall. Her crew were rescued by the steamship Medora (United Kingdom). Union was on a voyage from St. Ives to Cardiff, Glamorgan. She came ashore at Porthtowan, Cornwall and was wrecked.
William and Henry	United Kingdom	The schooner was wrecked on Scroby Sands, Norfolk. Her crew were rescued by the California Lifeboat. She was on a voyage from Sunderland, County Durham to Great Yarmouth, Norfolk.
Unnamed	United Kingdom	The Mersey Flat capsized and sank in the River Dee at Connah's Quay, Flintshire with the loss of three of the eight people on board.

== 4 February ==
List of shipwrecks: 4 February 1866
Ship	State	Description
Emerald Isle	United Kingdom	The ship was driven ashore near Milford Haven, Pembrokeshire. She was refloated on 21 March and towed in to Milford Haven.
Excelsior	United Kingdom	The steamship was wrecked off Juist, Kingdom of Hanover with the loss of ten of the 25 people on board. Survivors were rescued on 10 February by the Juister Lifeboat. She was on a voyage from Hull, Yorkshire to Hamburg.
Havre	France	The steamship was driven ashore at Hayle, Cornwall, United Kingdom. She was on a voyage from Swansea, Glamorgan, United Kingdom to Havre de Grâce, Seine-Inférieure. She was refloated on 14 February and was towed in to Penzance, Cornwall.
Jenny	United Kingdom	The barque was wrecked at Cape Hatteras, North Carolina, United States with the loss of twenty of the 22 people on board. Survivors were rescued by a pilot boat. She was on a voyage from Liverpool, Lancashire to Savannah, Georgia, United States.

== 5 February ==
List of shipwrecks: 5 February 1866
Ship	State	Description
Breeze	United Kingdom	The ship ran aground on the Whiting Sand, in the North Sea off the coast of Suffolk and was abandoned by her crew, who were rescued. She was on a voyage from Middlesbrough, Yorkshire to Colchester, Essex.
Britannia	United Kingdom	The ship was driven ashore and wrecked at Bridlington, Yorkshire. Her crew were rescued by the tug Bull Dog (France). Britannia was on a voyage from West Hartlepool, County Durham to London.
Havre	France	The steamship ran aground at Hayle, Cornwall. She was on a voyage from Havre de Grâce, Seine-Inférieure to Swansea, Glamorgan, United Kingdom.
Hero	United Kingdom	The ship was driven ashore on Islay. She was on a voyage from Glasgow, Renfrewshire to Tralee, County Kerry.
Nuevo Lepanto	Spain	The ship was attacked by pirates off Lantau Island, China and was abandoned by her crew. She was on a voyage from Hong Kong to Macao. She was subsequently taken in to Hong Kong by Escaño (Spanish Navy).
Sarah and Ann	(United Kingdom of Great Britain and Ireland) Jersey	The schooner ran aground on the Whiting Sand and was abandoned. Her six crew were rescued by a lifeboat. She was on a voyage from Newcastle upon Tyne, Northumberland to London.
Statesman	United Kingdom	The ship was driven ashore at Ardmore Point, Dunbartonshire. She was on a voyage from Glasgow, Renfrewshire to Cardiff, Glamorgan.
Ville de L'Oriente	France	The lugger collided with the lighter Hamoaze (United Kingdom) and was severely damaged at Greenock, Renfrewshire. Her crew got on board a boat from the lighter and were subsequently rescued by Zambese (United Kingdom). Ville de L'Oriente was on a voyage from Glasgow to the Charente. She was towed in to Greenock by the tug Sir Charles Napier (United Kingdom).
Zambese	United Kingdom	The ship ran aground in the Clyde at Greenock.

== 6 February ==
List of shipwrecks: 6 February 1866
Ship	State	Description
Alliance	United Kingdom	The schooner was driven ashore at Stornoway, Isle of Lewis, Outer Hebrides. She was on a voyage from Runcorn, Cheshire to Dundee, Forfarshire.
Chin-Chin	Hamburg	The schooner was attacked by a pirate junk off Hong Kong with the loss of a crew member. She was on a voyage from Hong Kong to Tientsin, China. After being ransacked and stripped of her guns, she put back to Hong Kong.
Emma	United Kingdom	The ketch was wrecked at Pittenweem, Fife. Both crew were rescued by a coble from the fishing lugger John Wesley (United Kingdom). Emma was on a voyage from Largo, Fife to Dunbar, Lothian.
Isis	Hamburg	The barque foundered in the Atlantic Ocean (38°39′N 60°00′W). Her crew were rescued She was on a voyage from New York to Cork, United Kingdom and/or Hamburg.
Jeanne d'Arc	France	The ship was driven ashore at Dunkirk, Nord. She was on a voyage from Riga, Russia to Dunkirk.
Newton	United Kingdom	The brig was abandoned in the North Sea. Her crew were rescued by the brig Robinsons (United Kingdom). Newton was on a voyage from Honfleur, Manche, France to Whitby, Yorkshire.
Wanata	United Kingdom	The full-rigged ship collided with Queen of Beauty (United Kingdom) and sank in the Bay of Biscay (46°13′N 8°38′W). Her crew and all 190 passengers were rescued by Queen of Beauty. Wanata was on a voyage from Liverpool, Lancashire to Melbourne, Victoria.

== 7 February ==
List of shipwrecks: 7 February 1866
Ship	State	Description
Ann and Susan	United Kingdom	The ship was wrecked near Beaumaris, Anglesey. Her crew were rescued. She was on a voyage from Belfast, County Antrim to Bangor, Caernarfonshire.
Carrie Davies	United Kingdom	The ship was wrecked at Carnsore Point, County Wexford. Her crew were rescued. She was on a voyage from Paraíba, Brazil to a British port.
Elizabeth	United Kingdom	The brig was abandoned in the North Sea 150 nautical miles (280 km) off the coast of County Durham. Her crew were rescued by the brig Robinsons (United Kingdom). She foundered on 10 February.
Iron Crown	United Kingdom	The ship ran aground on the Goodwin Sands, Kent. She was refloated with assistance from the lugger England's Glory (United Kingdom) and was towed in to The Downs by three tugs.
Petrel	(United Kingdom of Great Britain and Ireland) Jersey	The schooner ran aground on Scroby Sands, Norfolk and sank. Her crew were rescued by a yawl. She was on a voyage from Jersey to Hartlepool, County Durham.
Rochester	United States	The ship ran aground at Crosby, Lancashire, United Kingdom. She was on a voyage from Mobile, Alabama to Liverpool, Lancashire. She was refloated and taken in to Liverpool.
Uruguay	Mexico	The ship was driven ashore a Laguna.
Zaimar	United Kingdom	The schooner was wrecked near Boulogne, Pas-de-Calais, France with the loss of all hands.

== 8 February ==
List of shipwrecks: 8 February 1866
Ship	State	Description
Jessie	United Kingdom	The schooner was abandoned in the North Sea 70 nautical miles (130 km) east south east of Hartlepool, County Durham. Her crew were rescued by the barque Mary and Elizabeth (United Kingdom).
Lloyd Rainer	United Kingdom	The ship ran aground at Blackwall, Middlesex. She was refloated.
Memphis	(United Kingdom of Great Britain and Ireland) Victoria	The ship was wrecked on Malden Island. Her crew were subsequently rescued by the barque Jane (France).
Polly	United Kingdom	The schooner ran aground on the Cockle Sand, in the North Sea off the coast of Norfolk.. She was on a voyage from South Shields, County Durham to Strood, Kent. She was refloated and taken in to Great Yarmouth, Norfolk.
St. Abbs	United Kingdom	The sloop was wrecked on St Mary's Isle, Douglas, Isle of Man. She was on a voyage from Port Dundas, Renfrewshire to Coldingham, Berwickshire.

== 9 February ==
List of shipwrecks: 9 February 1866
Ship	State	Description
Caprera	Flag unknown	The barque was wrecked at Pointe-au-Canoniers, Mauritius. Her crew were rescued.
Freeman Clark	United States	The ship ran aground in the Rappahannock River. She was on a voyage from Cardiff, Glamorgan, United Kingdom to Baltimore, Maryland. She was refloated and taken in to Baltimore.
W. R. Carter	United States	The steamboat suffered a boiler explosion at Vicksburg, Mississippi.

== 10 February ==
List of shipwrecks: 10 February 1866
Ship	State	Description
Eliza Jane	United Kingdom	The schooner was driven ashore at Boscastle, Cornwall. She was on a voyage from Boscastle to Penzance.
Kersonese	United Kingdom	The ship ran aground in the Fullah Reach of the Hooghly River. She was on a voyage from London to Calcutta, India. She was refloated on 14 February and taken in to Calcutta.
Liberty	United Kingdom	The schooner collided with the Mersey Flat Victoria (United Kingdom) and sank off Little Orme Head, Caernarfonshire. Her crew were rescued.
Plover	United Kingdom	The barque was run into by the brig Amethyst (United Kingdom) 3 nautical miles (5.6 km) south of the Farne Islands, Northumberland. Her crew got on board Amethyst but later reboarded Plover, which later sank with the loss of all hands. She was on a voyage from Leith, Lothian to Sunderland, County Durham.
Voltigeur	United Kingdom	The tug collided with a Mersey Ferry and sank in the River Mersey.

== 11 February ==
List of shipwrecks: 11 February 1866
Ship	State	Description
Anglesea	United Kingdom	The pilot boat foundered in Studland Bay. Her crew were rescued by the steamship Royal Albert (United Kingdom).
Banquereau	France	The brig was driven ashore at the Haslar Hospital, Portsmouth, Hampshire, United Kingdom. Her crew were rescued. She was refloated and taken in to Portsmouth.
Breeze	United States	The ship was driven ashore in the Scheldt. She was on a voyage from New York to Antwerp, Belgium. She was refloated.
Demmin	Rostock	The barque was wrecked on the Brake Sand. Her fourteen crew survived. She was on a voyage from South Shields, County Durham, United Kingdom to Constantinople, Ottoman Empire.
Eliza	United Kingdom	The schooner, of Teignmouth, Devon, under Captain William Nathan Bryant, was en route from London to Topsham, Devon with a cargo of coal. Caught in a storm, she was wrecked off Poole, Dorset. Her crew of six all perished.
Elizabeth	United Kingdom	The brig, of Exeter, Devon, under Captain John Back, was en route from Newcastle upon Tyne, Northumberland to Plymouth, Devon with a cargo of coal. Driven by a storm, she lost her rudder on the Beer Pan Rocks off Hengistbury Head then went aground and was wrecked on a sand-bank at the entrance to Christchurch Harbour. There were seven crew on board. Three men perished before the remaining four men, including Captain Back, were eventually rescued by local fishermen.
Elizabeth	United Kingdom	The brigantine, of Teignmouth, under Captain James French, was caught in a storm and wrecked off Poole. There were six crew on board. They took to a boat that capsized and four men, including Captain French, perished. One man remained clinging to the upturned boat until rescued by Coastguards, and another succeeded in swimming ashore.
Equity	United Kingdom	The ship ran aground and was wrecked at Portsoy, Aberdeenshire. She was on a voyage from Newcastle upon Tyne to Portsoy.
Georgiana	France	The barque was wrecked near St Alban's Head, Dorset, United Kingdom. She was on a voyage from Port-au-Prince, Haiti to Havre de Grâce, Seine-Inférieure. She was refloated on 23 March and towed in to Weymouth by Mary Ellen ( (United Kingdom of Great Britain and Ireland) Jersey).
Good Will	United Kingdom	The smack was driven ashore and wrecked in Studland Bay. She was on a voyage from Portsmouth to Swanage, Dorset.
Johanna Elizabeth	Hamburg	The brig was driven ashore and wrecked at Langstone, Hampshire with the loss of all hands, eight or nine lives. She was on a voyage from Newcastle upon Tyne, Northumberland, United Kingdom to Martinique.
Palace	United Kingdom	The ship was wrecked on the Hoole Sand, in the English Channel off the coast of Dorset.
Pero	United Kingdom	The brig was driven ashore and wrecked at Great Yarmouth, Norfolk. Her seven crew were rescued by the Great Yarmouth Lifeboat. She was on a voyage from London to West Hartlepool, County Durham.
Ranger	United Kingdom	The pilot boat was driven ashore in Studland Bay.
Reliance	United Kingdom	The barque was driven ashore and wrecked at Great Yarmouth. Her nine crew were rescued by the Great Yarmouth Lifeboat. She was on a voyage from Port Clarence, County Durham to Dieppe, Seine-Inférieure, France.
T. and C. Sutton	United Kingdom	The schooner was driven ashore at Poole. She was on a voyage from Saint-Malo, Ille-et-Vilaine, France to Goole, Yorkshire. She was refloated.
Thomas Rushbridger	United Kingdom	The ship was driven ashore and severely damaged at Folkestone, Kent. She was refloated.

== 12 February ==
List of shipwrecks: 12 February 1866
Ship	State	Description
Cumberland Lass	United Kingdom	The brig was wrecked at Margate, Kent. Her crew were rescued. She was on a voyage from Hartlepool, County Durham to London and/or Boulogne, Pas-de-Calais, France.
Esther	(United Kingdom of Great Britain and Ireland) New Zealand	The schooner went aground and was wrecked to the south of the mouth of the Manawatu River, with the loss of four lives.
Hamlet	United States	The full-rigged ship was driven ashore and wrecked at Orleans, Massachusetts. She was on a voyage from Calcutta, India to Boston, Massachusetts.
Hasard	France	The brig was driven ashore and wrecked at Larne, County Antrim, United Kingdom. Her crew were rescued. She was on a voyage from Ardrossan, Ayrshire to Neath, Glamorgan, United Kingdom.
Regent	United Kingdom	The ship was abandoned in the North Sea off Orfordness, Suffolk and subsequently foundered. Her crew survived. She was on a voyage from Hartlepool, County Durham to London.
Royal Albert	United Kingdom	The ship foundered off Trevose Head, Cornwall with the loss of all 34 crew. She was on a voyage from Calcutta, India to London.
William Frazer	United Kingdom	The brig was abandoned in the North Sea 25 nautical miles (46 km) off the coast of Norfolk. Her crew were rescued by the smack Brilliant (United Kingdom). William Frazer was on a voyage from Colchester, Essex to Seaham, County Durham. She was towed in to Great Yarmouth, Norfolk on 14 February by the smacks Fortitude and Good Design (both United Kingdom).

== 13 February ==
List of shipwrecks: 13 February 1866
Ship	State	Description
Catherine	United Kingdom	The ship was driven ashore at Vlissingen, Zeeland, Netherlands. She was on a voyage from Newcastle upon Tyne, Northumberland to the Black Sea. She was refloated.
Flora	United Kingdom	The steamship was wrecked at Lindisfarne. She was on a voyage from Middlesbrough, Yorkshire to Leith, Lothian.
General Williams	United States	The ship was abandoned in the Atlantic Ocean. Her crew were rescued by Thornton (United Kingdom). General Williams was on a voyage from Liverpool, Lancashire, United Kingdom to New York.
John Liddell	United Kingdom	The steamship was driven ashore at Flamborough Head, Yorkshire.
Margaret	United Kingdom	The ship was driven ashore at Vlissingen. She was on a voyage from South Shields, County Durham to the Mediterranean.
Meggie Anderson	United Kingdom	The barque was destroyed by fire in the Atlantic Ocean. Her fourteen crew took to the boats; they were rescued on 18 February by Manfred (Hamburg). Meggie Anderson was on a voyage from Tuticorin, India to London.
Para	United Kingdom	The ship ran aground on the Sunk Sand, in the North Sea off the coast of Essex. She was refloated with the assistance of six smacks and assisted in to Harwich, Essex.
Regent	United Kingdom	The brig foundered in the Swin. Her crew were rescued by the smack Excelsior (United Kingdom). Regent was on a voyage from London to Hartlepool, County Durham.

== 14 February ==
List of shipwrecks: 14 February 1866
Ship	State	Description
Galway Lass	United Kingdom	The brig ran aground off Deal, Kent. She was on a voyage from Sunderland, County Durham to Newhaven, Sussex. She was refloated and taken in to The Downs.
Herald of the Morning	United States	The clipper ran aground off Boston, Massachusetts. She was on a voyage from South Shields, County Durham, United Kingdom to Boston. She was refloated with assistance.
Ryndman	United Kingdom	The brig was in collision with the steamship Peruvian (United Kingdom) and was abandoned in the Victoria Channel. Her crew were rescued by Peruvian. Ryndman was subsequently towed in to the River Mersey by a tug.

== 15 February ==
List of shipwrecks: 15 February 1866
Ship	State	Description
Advena	United Kingdom	The brig was driven ashore and wrecked at Kingsdown, Kent. She was on a voyage from South Shields, County Durham to Southampton, Hampshire.
Elizabeth Adnett	United Kingdom	The brig sank 20 nautical miles (37 km) off Heligoland. Her crew were rescued. She was on a voyage from Sunderland, County Durham to Hamburg.
Isabella	United Kingdom	The brig was driven out to sea from São Miguel Island, Azores. She was taken in tow by Mary Blake (United Kingdom) but the tow parted the next day and she was abandoned by her crew, who were rescued by Mary Blake. Isabella was subsequently boared by six sailors from the Azores. She was towed in to São Miguel Island in a derelict condition on 21 February.

== 16 February ==
List of shipwrecks: 16 February 1866
Ship	State	Description
Argo	Danzig	The ship was driven ashore and wrecked at Großendorf, Prussia. She was on a voyage from Danzig to London, United Kingdom.
British America	United Kingdom	The ship was driven ashore and wrecked on the coast of Georgia, United States. Her crew were rescued. British America was on a voyage from Cardiff, Glamorgan to Savannah, Georgia. She was consequently condemned.
Helen	United Kingdom	The fishing boat was wrecked at Cellardyke, Fife. Her six crew were rescued.
Plymouth	(United Kingdom of Great Britain and Ireland) Barbados	The brig was wrecked at "Gioja", Sicily, Italy. Her crew survived.

== 17 February ==
List of shipwrecks: 17 February 1866
Ship	State	Description
Host Heate	United Kingdom	The barque was wrecked at Lisbon, Portugal. Her crew were rescued. She was on a voyage from Cardiff, Glamorgan to Lisbon.
Loda	United Kingdom	The ship was abandoned off Lady Elliot's Island and was set afire. She was on a voyage from Cardiff to Shanghai, China.

== 18 February ==
List of shipwrecks: 18 February 1866
Ship	State	Description
Granadian	United Kingdom	The steamship foundered off Pico Island, Azores. Her crew were rescued by the steamship Seal (United Kingdom). She was on a voyage from the River Mersey to the West Indies.
Greceras	United Kingdom	The schooner collided with the brig Anna (Norway) and was abandoned off Cape St. Vincent, Spain. Her crew were rescued. She was on a voyage from Palermo, Sicily, Italy to Antwerp, Belgium.

== 19 February ==
List of shipwrecks: 19 February 1866
Ship	State	Description
Fraternidad	United Kingdom	The ship ran aground on the Haisborough Sands, in the North Sea off the coast of Norfolk, United Kingdom of Great Britain and Ireland. She was on a voyage from Kristiansand, Norway to Barcelona. She was refloated and take in to Lowestoft, Suffolk, United Kingdom in a leaky condition.
Margaret	United Kingdom	The ship struck a sunken rock in Angle Bay and was holed. She was beached in a sinking condition. Margaret was on a voyage from Newport, Monmouthshire to Liverpool. Following temporary repairs, she as taken in to Hubberson Pill, Pembrokeshire.

== 20 February ==
List of shipwrecks: 20 February 1866
Ship	State	Description
Elizabeth Brown	United Kingdom	The schooner ran aground at Sunderland, County Durham. She was on a voyage from Sunderland to Arbroath, Forfarshire. She was refloated and towed in to Sunderland in a leaky condition.
Fair Hope	United Kingdom	The smack was driven ashore and capsized at Newquay, Cornwall. Her crew were rescued. She was on a voyage from Newport, Monmouthshire to Aberavon, Glamorgan.
Flora	United Kingdom	The ship was driven ashore and wrecked on Inchcolm.
Sir George Grey	United Kingdom	The barque was wrecked on Cockburn's Island. Her crew survived. She was on a voyage from Valparaíso, Chile to Sydney, New South Wales.

== 21 February ==
List of shipwrecks: 21 February 1866
Ship	State	Description
Hong Kong	United Kingdom	The ship's passengers and some of the crew mutinied and ran the ship ashore 38 nautical miles (70 km) west of Macao, China. She was on a voyage from Whampoa to Havana, Cuba. The vessel was pillaged, and was abandoned on 23 February. She was subsequently towed in to Macao by a steamship.
Sauvegarde	United Kingdom	The barque was driven ashore and sank at Shanklin, Isle of Wight, United Kingdom. Her crew were rescued. She was on a voyage from Dunkirk, Nord to Bordeaux, Gironde.

== 22 February ==
List of shipwrecks: 22 February 1866
Ship	State	Description
Arthy	United Kingdom	The schooner was run into by the barque Oby ( (United Kingdom of Great Britain and Ireland) ) Jersey) and sank off Lowestoft, Suffolk. Her crew were rescued by Oby. Arthy was on a voyage from Grimsby, Lincolnshire to Port Said, Egypt.
Economie	Netherlands	The schooner ran aground on the Shipwash Sand, in the North Sea off the coast of Suffolk. She was on a voyage from Groningen to London, United Kingdom. She was refloated and assisted in to Harwich, Essex, United Kingdom by four smacks.
Fanny	United Kingdom	The ship was wrecked at the mouth of the Rio Grande do Sul. Her crew were rescued. She was on a voyage from Newcastle upon Tyne, Northumberland to the Rio Grande do Sul.
Iris	United Kingdom	The ship collided with the schooner Aubaine (France) and sank off "Foulinguet", Finistère, France. Her crew were rescued by Aubaine. Iris was on a voyage from Pont-l'Abbé, Finistère to Swansea, Glamorgan.
Liberty	United Kingdom	The ship was driven ashore at Maryport, Cumberland.
Orphine	France	The ship was driven ashore at Whitburn, County Durham, United Kingdom. She was refloated with the assistance of two tugs and towed in to South Shields, County Durham.
Peace	United Kingdom	The ship ran aground off the South Rock Lighthouse. She was on a voyage from Pembrey, Carmarthenshire to Glasgow, Renfrewshire. She was refloated and put in to Ramsey, Isle of Man for repairs.

== 23 February ==
List of shipwrecks: 23 February 1866
Ship	State	Description
Altivo	Portugal	The brig was driven ashore and wrecked at Bideford, Devon, United Kingdom. She was on a voyage from London to Cardiff, Glamorgan, United Kingdom.
Arthur	United Kingdom	The ship was wrecked on the Leman and Owers Sands, in the North Sea. Her crew were rescued. She was on a voyage from Sunderland, County Durham to Aden.
Elizabeth	United Kingdom	The schooner was driven ashore at Lindisfarne, Northumberland. She was on a voyage from Hull, Yorkshire to Berwick upon Tweed.
Ellora	United Kingdom	The full-rigged ship was driven ashore at Algeciras, Spain. Her crew were rescued. She was on a voyage from South Shields, County Durham to Águilas, Spain or vice versa. She was consequently condemned.
Jeremiah	United Kingdom	The ship was abandoned off the Farne Islands, Northumberland. She was on a voyage from St. Alban's Head, Dorset to Sunderland.
Lucy Ellen	United Kingdom	The ship was abandoned off Whitby, Yorkshire. Her crew were rescued by Excelsior (United Kingdom). Lucy Ellen was on a voyage from Boston, Lincolnshire to Sunderland.
Maria	Denmark	The ship foundered 3 nautical miles (5.6 km) south of Algeciras with the loss of all hands.
Pablo	Italy	The barque was driven ashore at Palmones, Spain. Her crew were rescued.
Strive	United Kingdom	The ship was driven ashore at "Garde", Aberdeenshire. Her crew were rescued.
Tally Ho	United Kingdom	The ship was abandoned off the Isle of Man. Her crew were rescued by the steamship Prince Albert (United Kingdom). Tally Ho was on a voyage from Barmouth, Merionethshire to Briton Ferry, Glamorgan.
Warner	United Kingdom	The brig was driven ashore at Aberdeen. She was on a voyage from Aberdeen to the Firth of Forth.

== 24 February ==
List of shipwrecks: 24 February 1866
Ship	State	Description
Doris	United Kingdom	The schooner ran aground on the Cockle Sand, in the North Sea off the coast of Norfolk. She was refloated and towed in to Great Yarmouth, Norfolk in a leaky condition.
Lady Chandos	United Kingdom	The ship caught fire and put in to Montrose, Forfarshire. She was on a voyage from Sunderland, County Durham to Macduff, Aberdeenshire.
Louisa	United Kingdom	The brig was abandoned at in the Atlantic Ocean. Her crew were rescued by Fairy (United States). Louisa was on a voyage from Agrigento, Sicily, Italy to Glasgow, Renfrewshire.
Talisman	United Kingdom	The steamship was driven ashore on Grand Turk, Turks Islands. She was on a voyage from New York, United States to Kingston, Jamaica. She was refloated and resumed her voyage.

== 25 February ==
List of shipwrecks: 25 February 1866
Ship	State	Description
Lively	United Kingdom	The pilot boat capsized in Carlingford Lough with the loss of all seven crew.
Salacia	United Kingdom	The schooner foundered in the North Sea 8 nautical miles (15 km) east by south of Whitby, Yorkshire. Her crew survived. She was on a voyage from Seaham, County Durham to Great Yarmouth, Norfolk.
Una	United Kingdom	The steamship caught fire at Liverpool, Lancashire.

== 26 February ==
List of shipwrecks: 26 February 1866
Ship	State	Description
Johanna	Netherlands	The schooner was driven ashore on Vlieland, Friesland. She was on a voyage from Harlingen, Friesland to Newcastle upon Tyne, Northumberland, United Kingdom. She was refloated, but consequently sank. Her crew were rescued.
Metta Catharina	Italy	The ship was wrecked at Torre Molinos, Spain. she was on a voyage from Livorno to Dublin, United Kingdom.

== 27 February ==
List of shipwrecks: 27 February 1866
Ship	State	Description
Ada	United Kingdom	The schooner ran aground at Killala, County Mayo. She was on a voyage from "Brucklin" to Ballina, County Mayo. She was refloated and taken in to Killala.
Ann	United Kingdom	The ship ran aground and was severely damaged in Bangor Bay. She was refloated and taken in to Bangor, County Down.
Cynosure	United Kingdom	The schooner was wrecked at Safi, Morocco. Her crew were rescued.
Ellen Sinclair	United Kingdom	The collier, a steamship, collided with the steamship Minna (United Kingdom) and sank in the River Thames at Erith, Kent. Her crew were rescued. She was on a voyage from London to Newcastle upon Tyne, Northumberland. Ellen Sinclair was refloated on 27 March and beached.
India	Bremen	The ship was driven ashore at Wremen, Kingdom of Hanover. She was on a voyage from Santa Cruz, Cuba to Bremen. She was refloated the next day with assistance from the steamship Simson (Flag unknown) and taken in to Bremen.
Marie Celestine	France	The ship ran aground on the Goodwin Sands, Kent. She was on a voyage from Sunderland, County Durham, United Kingdom to Nantes, Loire-Inférieure. She was refloated with the assistance of two Deal boats and put in to Ramsgate, Kent.
Morning Star	United Kingdom	The ship sank off Llandudno, Caernarfonshire. Her crew were rescued by the Llandudno Lifeboat. She was on a voyage from Port Dinorwic, Caernarfonshire to Liverpool, Lancashire.

== 28 February ==
List of shipwrecks: 28 February 1866
Ship	State	Description
Alliance	United Kingdom	The ship ran aground at Whitstable, Kent. She was on a voyage from South Shields, County Durham to Caen, Calvados, France. She was refloated on 2 March and taken in to Whitstable.
Adelaide	(United Kingdom of Great Britain and Ireland) South Australia	The schooner ran aground and capsized at Adelaide. She was refloated and repaired.
Fruhling	Prussia	The ship ran aground on the Pennington Spit, off the Isle of Wight, United Kingdom. She was on a voyage from London, United Kingdom to Veracruz, Mexico. She was refloated on 2 March and towed in to Cowes, Isle of Wight.
James and Matilda	United Kingdom	The fishing smack struck a sunken wreck and sank off the Mewstone with the loss of two of her three crew.
Royal Dane	United Kingdom	The ship ran aground at Portsmouth Hampshire. She was on a voyage from Sunderland, County Durham to Southampton, Hampshire. She was refloated and resumed her voyage.
Sarah	United Kingdom	The ship struck a sunken wreck at Lowestoft, Suffolk. She was on a voyage from Sunderland to London.
Vauban	French Navy	The paddle frigate was sunk by a spar torpedo in an experiment at Toulon, Var.

== Unknown date ==
List of shipwrecks: Unknown date in February 1866
Ship	State	Description
Agincourt	France	The ship capsized at Grimsby, Lincolnshire, United Kingdom. She was righted.
Alnwick Castle	United Kingdom	The schooner was abandoned. She was on a voyage from Silloth, Cumberland to Ardrishaig, Argyllshire. She was taken in to Ayr on 22 February.
Amazones	Peruvian Navy	The frigate ran aground and was wrecked at Port Mont, Chile before 23 February.
Anne	United Kingdom	The ship was destroyed by fire in the South Atlantic (28°21′S 44°06′W).
Arcano	(United Kingdom of Great Britain and Ireland) British North America	The ship foundered 15 nautical miles (28 km) south west of the Smalls Lighthouse, Cornwall on or before 20 February.
Avalon	United Kingdom	The ship was sunk by ice in the Atlantic Ocean. She was on a voyage from Queenstown, County Cork to Saint John's, Newfoundland, British North America.
Capital	United Kingdom	The ship foundered in the North Sea. she was on a voyage from Goole, Yorkshire to Deptford, Kent.
Cap Rouge	United Kingdom	The ship was abandoned in the Atlantic Ocean. She was on a voyage from Saint John, New Brunswick, British North America to London.
Carrie E. Crouse	United States	The schooner was lost on the passage to Baltimore.
Catharine	United Kingdom	The ship was wrecked before 5 February. She was on a voyage from Tynemouth, Northumberland to Glasgow, Renfrewshire.
C. Cleanstock	United States	The ship was wrecked at Pernambuco, Brazil.
Cygne	France	The ship was driven ashore at Brielle, South Holland, Netherlands. She was on a voyage from Riga, Russia to Rouen, Seine-Inférieure. She was refloated on 20 February and taken in to Brielle.
Echo	(United Kingdom of Great Britain and Ireland) British North America	The ship was driven ashore at "Trevay", Argyllshire. She was on a voyage from Buctouche, New Brunswick to Bristol, Gloucestershire.
Edouard	France	The full-rigged ship was wrecked near Akyab, Burma.
Ellen McDonald	United Kingdom	The ship was driven ashore at "the Dingle". She was on a voyage from Liverpool, Lancashire to Galveston, Texas, United States. She was refloated and put back to Liverpool.
Energy	Bremen	The ship was holed by ice and sank. She was on a voyage from New York to Bremen.
Earl King	(United Kingdom of Great Britain and Ireland) New South Wales	The steamship ran aground off Dawes Point before 24 February. She was refloated.
Foam of the Sea	United Kingdom	The ship foundered. She was on a voyage from Livorno, Italy to New York.
Fox	United Kingdom	The sloop was abandoned in the North Sea off the coast of County Durham on or before 23 February. Two crew were rescued by Julia Ann Gale (United Kingdom). Fox was taken in to Hartlepool, County Durham on 1 March.
Genevieve	France	The ship was wrecked at Amble, Northumberland. She was on a voyage from Boulogne, Pas-de-Calais to Amble.
Herald of the Morning	United Kingdom	The ship ran aground at Boston, Massachusetts, United States. She was on a voyage from South Shields, County Durham to Boston.
Honore	United Kingdom	The ship was driven ashore and wrecked at Brixham, Devon. She was on a voyage from Rouen to Belfast, County Antrim.
Jacoba	United Kingdom	The ship was driven ashore and wrecked near "Fishcoombe Point". She was on a voyage from Falmouth, Cornwall to Carlisle, Cumberland.
Jessie	(United Kingdom of Great Britain and Ireland) New Zealand	The schooner left Stewart Island for Hokitika on February 26, carrying a crew of four. She was never sighted again.
J. W. Wade	United States	The brig was driven ashore at Cape Cod, Massachusetts. She was on a voyage from Rotterdam, South Holland to Boston, Massachusetts.
Loa	Peruvian Navy	The monitor ran aground and was wrecked at Callao before 23 February.
London	United Kingdom	The ship was wrecked near Ceuta, Spain. Her crew were rescued. She was on a voyage from Alexandria, Egypt to Newcastle upon Tyne, Northumberland.
Mary	United Kingdom	The ship ran aground on the Gunfleet Sand, in the North Sea off the coast of Suffolk. She was on a voyage from Seaham, County Durham to London. She was refloated and assisted in to Harwich, Essex where she was beached.
Okalona	United States	The ship was wrecked on Faial Island, Azores before 3 February. She was on a voyage from Liverpool to Baltimore, Maryland.
Rhine	United States	The ship was wrecked on New Providence, Bahamas before 14 February. She was on a voyage from Mobile, Alabama to Havana, Cuba and Liverpool.
S. C. Tupper	United States	The ship was wrecked on the Hogsty Reef before 3 February. She was on a voyage from Miragoâne, Haiti to New York.
Vesta	United Kingdom	The ship foundered off the coast of Vendée, France on or before 14 January.
Vincent	United Kingdom	The ship was driven ashore and wrecked at Cape Cod, Massachusetts before 19 February. She was on a voyage from London to Boston
Zoe	United Kingdom	The ship was wrecked near "Fishcoombe Point" with the loss of all six crew. She was on a voyage from Plymouth, Devon to Cardiff, Glamorgan.
Unnamed	Flag unknown	The ship was wrecked on the Barrow Sand, in the North Sea off the coast of Essex, United Kingdom with the loss of one of her six crew. Survivors were rescued by the smack Emily (United Kingdom).
Unnamed	Spain	The ship collided with the Haisborough Lightship ( Trinity House) before 22 March and sank with the loss of all but one of her crew. The survivor got on board the lightship.

=== Bibliography ===
- Ingram, C. W. N., and Wheatley, P. O., (1936) Shipwrecks: New Zealand disasters 1795–1936. Dunedin, NZ: Dunedin Book Publishing Association.
