= MV Fedra =

Cargo ship

Coordinates: 36.110534°N 5.344812°W

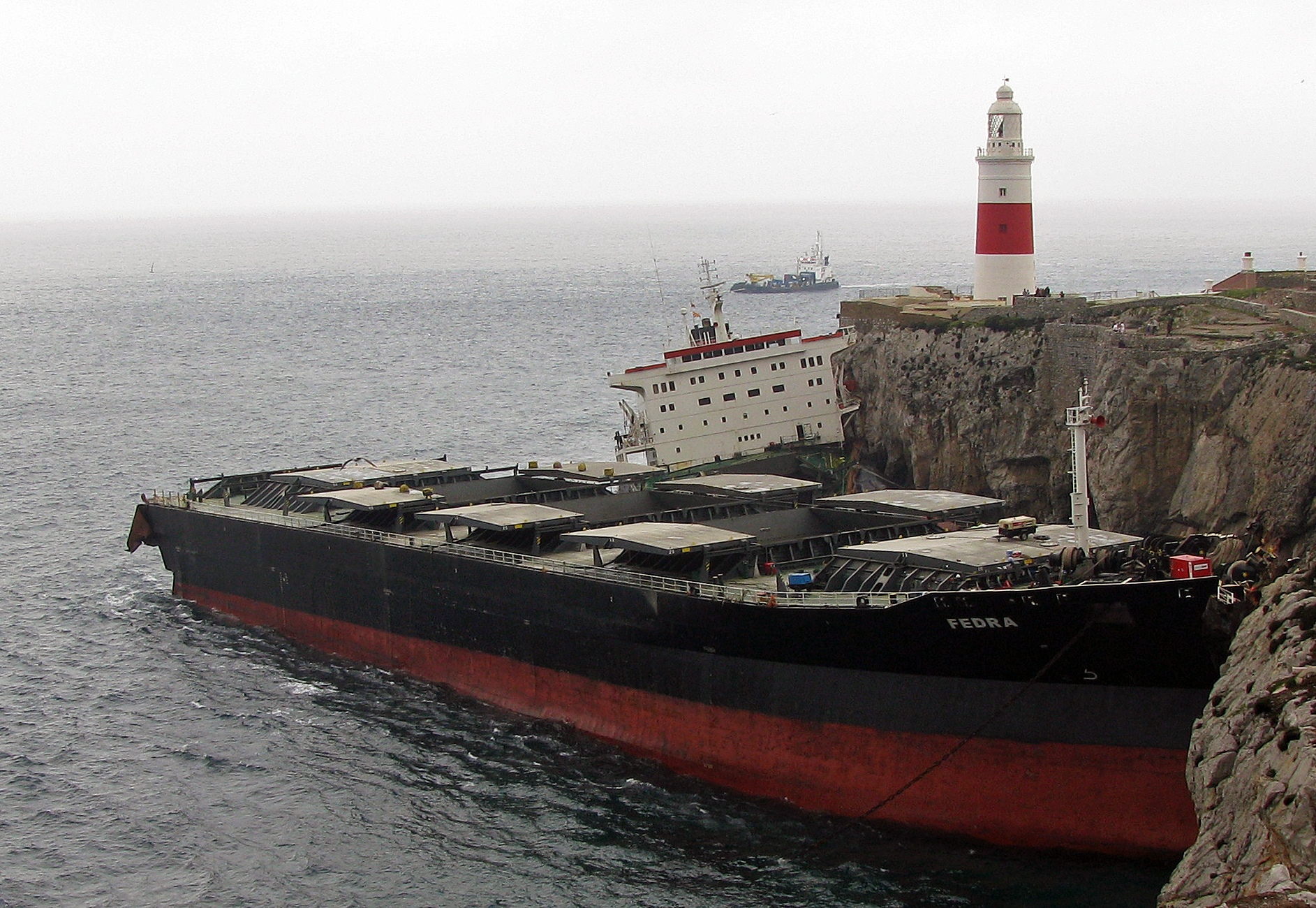
- MV Fedra at Europa Point, after breaking in half

History

Liberia
- Name: Fedra, formerly, Tenacity and Marine Ranger
- Port of registry: Monrovia
- Builder: Burmeister & Wain (B&W), Copenhagen, Denmark
- Yard number: 713
- Launched: 10 August 1984
- Completed: 1984
- In service: 06/10-1984 - 10/10-2008
- Identification: IMO number: 8208713
- Fate: Wrecked 10 October 2008
- Notes: Fedra was one of 19 sister ships built by B&W Shipyard.

General characteristics
- Type: Bulk carrier
- Tonnage: 35,886 GT; 63,940 DWT
- Length: 737.7 ft (224.85 m)
- Beam: 105.8 ft (32.25 m)
- Draft: 59.1 ft (18.01 m)
- Notes: USCG PSIX

MV Fedra was a Liberian-registered bulk-carrier cargo ship. It ran aground and smashed against Europa Point, the southernmost tip of Gibraltar on 10 October 2008 following severe gale force winds measuring 12 on the Beaufort scale. Spanish and Gibraltarian emergency services mounted a joint rescue operation, Gibraltar declared a Major Incident and requested the standby of additional statutory and voluntary emergency services (including St John Ambulance Gibraltar), although due to the safe rescue of all crew from Fedra they were ultimately not needed.

Five of its 31 crew members were airlifted to safety by a Spanish coast guard helicopter and the rest were hoisted up by an improvised crane system. The vessel broke in half shortly thereafter.

About half of its 300 tons of fuel spilled into the sea. Some of such oil washed ashore along Gibraltar's western coast, particularly in the area of Rosia Bay and Camp Bay. Spanish sources said that some fuel from Fedra had washed up on some Campo beaches having drifted as far as Tarifa. There were also oil slicks in the Bay of Gibraltar.

Fedra avoided becoming a permanent shipwreck when the forward section was re-floated and towed round into the Bay of Gibraltar in February 2009. It was moored alongside the South Mole in Gibraltar Harbour. The superstructure was cut away from the hull of the aft section, and was placed the dockside at HM Naval Base.

A report was released by the Gibraltar Maritime Association in January 2012 which reveals how the Company undermined the Master of Fedra and his authority in his attempts to save both the crew and the ship. The report also explains the various aspects which led to the demise of MV Fedra.

== See also ==
- MV New Flame
