= Palmones (river) =

River in Spain

Coordinates: 36°10′N 5°26′W

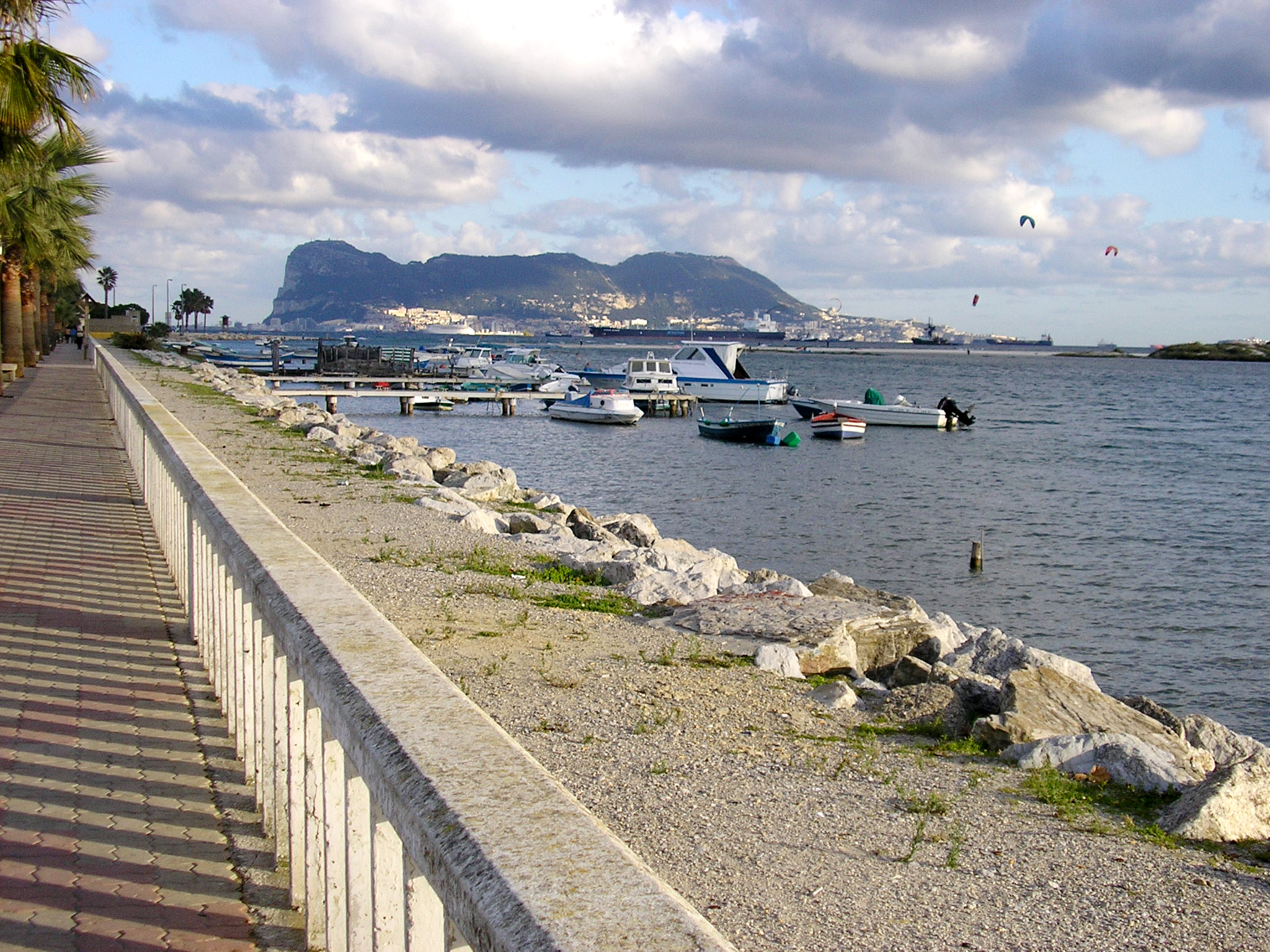
Mouth of the Palmones river in the Bay of Algeciras, Andalusia, Spain

The Río Palmones is a river of the Province of Cádiz in Southeastern coastal Spain. Its source is in Lomas del Castaño, Sierra Blanquilla, and it flows for some 37 kilometres (23 mi) into the Bay of Gibraltar, North of the city of Algeciras, in the neighborhood of Palmones. The Battle of Río Palmones took place here in 1342.
