= MV New Flame =

Panamanian freight vessel

Coordinates: 36°06′06″N 5°20′45″W

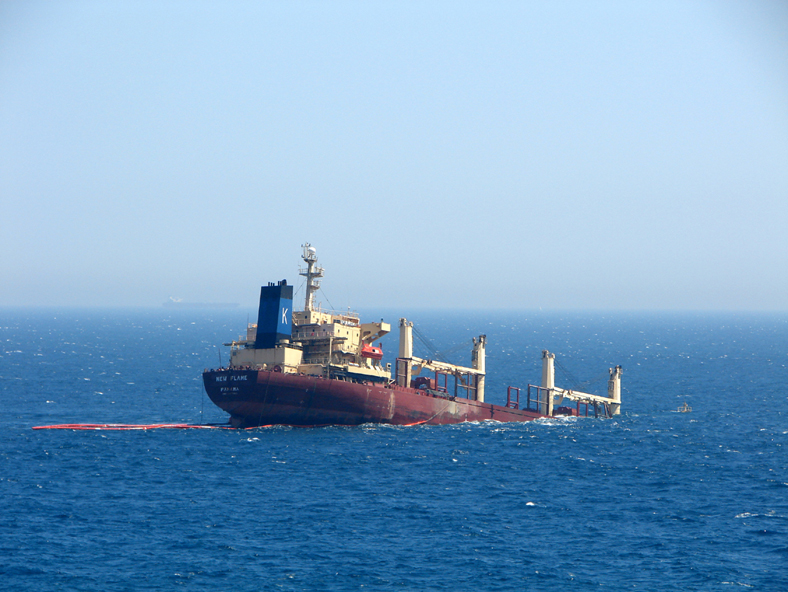
- New Flame sinking off Europa Point, 13 August 2007

History

Panama
- Name: New Flame (previously Aditya Gautam and Skaustrand)
- Owner: Transmar (previously Textiles & Industries Ltd)
- Port of registry: Panama
- Builder: Daewoo H.I, South Korea
- Launched: 26 March 1994
- Completed: June 1994
- Identification: IMO number: 9077393
- Fate: Sank off Gibraltar in 2007

General characteristics
- Type: Bulk carrier
- Tonnage: 27,000 GT; 44,000 DWT
- Length: 190 m (623.36 ft)
- Beam: 30 m (98.43 ft)
- Height: 28 m (91.86 ft)
- Draft: 59.1 ft (18.01 m)

MV New Flame was a Panamanian bulk-carrier cargo ship. It collided with an oil tanker off Europa Point, the southernmost tip of Gibraltar on 12 August 2007, and ended up partially submerged in the Strait of Gibraltar. The vessel broke into two in December 2007 amid numerous unsuccessful recovery efforts. The cargo was salvaged and the stern section removed for scrap. Following the crew's rescue, the captain was arrested for having departed without authorisation. Charges of endangering shipping were later dropped.

== Ship description ==
New Flame measured 190 metres (620 ft) long, 30 metres (98 ft) wide and 28 metres (92 ft) tall, of which 16 metres (52 ft) were under the water line. It measured 26,824 GT and had a capacity of nearly 44,000 tonnes deadweight (DWT). At time of the incident it had a crew of 23 and it was owned by Transmar, a Greek shipping company. The ship was built in June 1994 by Daewoo H.I, South Korea and first named as Skaustrand. From 1995 it was named Aditya Gautam and was owned by the Indian company Century Textiles & Industries Ltd, who sold it in 2005 to Transmar for $22.5 million.

== Collision ==
In the early morning of 12 August 2007, New Flame departed from Europa Point en route to Turkey, carrying 27,000 tons of scrap metal and 750 tons of fuel oil. About one kilometre south of Europa Point, it ran into the stern of Torm Gertrude, a double-hulled Danish petroleum tanker that was scheduled to complete a personnel transfer in the Spanish port of Algeciras. The tanker proceeded towards Algeciras after the collision, where it was secured, with its cargo of 39,000 tons of fuel, whilst New Flame took water by the bow. The ship was abandoned by the crew and thereafter became partially submerged, drifted and eventually ran aground nearby.

== Recovery efforts ==
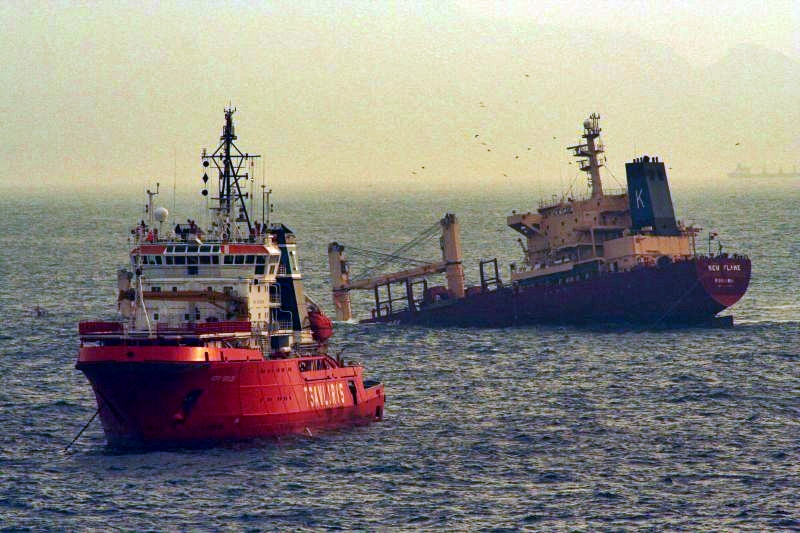
Recovery efforts underway, 13 October 2007

The rescue response at the working level of Gibraltar was commended, although there was considerable criticism at a local level in Spain, due to the dispute between Spain and Gibraltar.

Removal of the vessel’s fuel was initiated on 15 August with the arrival of the tug Hua-An, later joined by the tug Fotiy Krylov (one of the largest of the world). It was the first priority of the salvage operation to minimise the environmental impact of the collision, followed by operations to refloat the ship. On 20 August the salvage operation turned to the controlled break-up of the ship in two halves and the first reports of a 'minor' oil-spill were reported. It was reported that 500 tons of fuel remained on board. The tug Fotiy Krylov had attempted to move the ship and divers checked the damage, concluding that the ship's structural integrity was sound enough for the removal of fuel to continue. By 24 August, it looked likely that the ship would be refloated, even if only partially to then tow to a safer location.

The salvage companies involved were Tsavliris (based in Greece) and Svitzer Wijsmuller Salvage (Dutch subcontractors). On 14 September 2007, the Government of Gibraltar announced that all fuel had been removed from the vessel, totalling 780 cubic metres. The operation had been hampered by bad weather and the exposed location of the wreck. It was also reported that the ship would not be salvaged in a single piece due to structural damage and would be instead cut in two parts at one-third of its length from the bow. The stern section would be removed first and towed to a safe area, where it would have its cargo removed and then be taken to dry dock in Gibraltar. On completion, the bow part would have been taken apart where it rested.

The operation was scheduled to start in October 2007 with the removal of the stern in November and the bow as late as March 2008. However, the salvage company experienced technical difficulties in cutting up the vessel. Following heavily prolonged bad weather, the vessel broke into two on 22 December 2007, prompting an emergency meeting by the Government of Gibraltar with maritime authorities.

On 28 December 2007, the vessel's insurers placed the salvage operation in the hands of Titan Maritime, one of the world's largest marine salvage companies. New Flame avoided becoming a local shipwreck when in August 2008, the stern section was lifted and taken to the ship repair yard.

The salvage operation of New Flame featured on "Salvage Code Red" on the National Geographic Channel on 16 February 2009.

== Political impact ==
Following the collision, there were concerns raised that such incidents in the area were commonplace, with local politicians on both Gibraltar and Spanish sides calling for a review of procedures. On 21 August the Spanish Maritime Safety Agency (Salvamento Maritimo) announced that it had put in place its anti-pollution alert program. This involved the deployment of the ship Don Inda, based in Galicia, which arrived at Algeciras on 14 August. On 31 August the European Maritime Safety Agency announced that, at the request of the Spanish administration the ship Mistra Bay, which specialised in the treatment of pollution, would be sent to the area.

Following continued media speculation and accusations in Spain, the Government of Gibraltar announced it would make no further public comment, except to say that "this salvage operation has taken place more quickly than comparable salvage operations elsewhere in the world."

== Legal issues ==
The captain, Demetrio Konstantinos, a Greek national, was arrested and later released on bail. He faced safety charges that New Flame may have left the Port of Gibraltar without authorisation. Subsequently Konstantinos pleaded guilty to leaving port without proper notification and paid a small fine, but charges of endangering shipping were dropped.

== See also ==
MV Fedra
