= Pícaro =

River in Spain

Rogue River
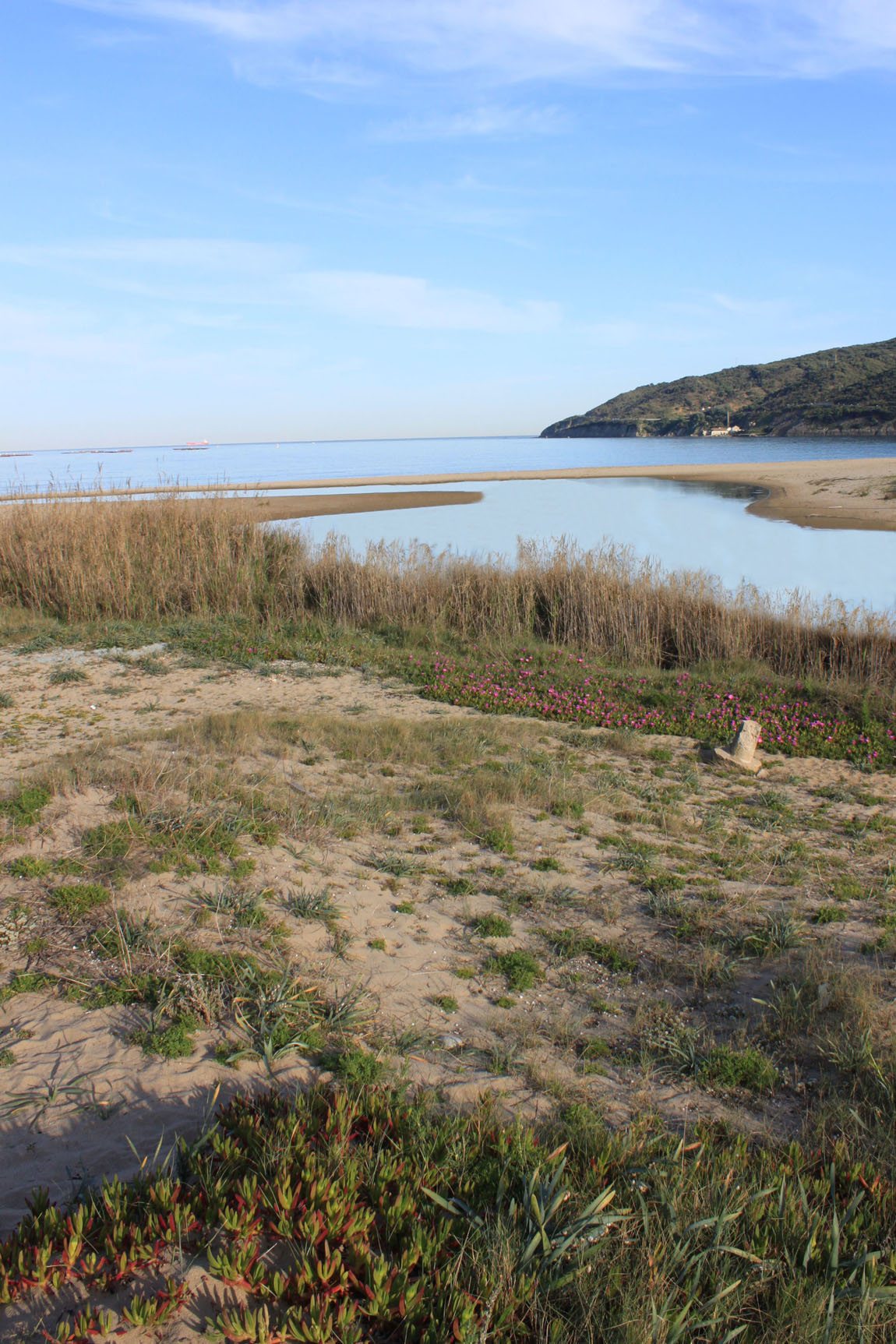
- Río Pícaro

- Location within Algeciras
- Native name: Río Pícaro (Spanish)

Location
- Country: Spain
- Autonomous Region: Andalusia

Physical characteristics
- Source
  - location: Sierra del Bujeo/Sierra del Algarrobo
- Mouth
  - location: Playa de Getares, Algeciras, Spain.
  - coordinates: 36°06′N 5°27′W
- Length: 7.7 km (4.8 mi)

Río Pícaro is a river of southeastern Andalusia, Spain. Originating in the Sierra del Bujeo /Sierra del Algarrobo, it flows for 7.7 kilometres (4.8 mi) into the Bay of Algeciras, not far from Algeciras. The terrain of the river course is rugged; Pícaro is Spanish for rogue.
