= Pentreath =

Coordinates: 49.971°N 5.220°W

- Pentreath Beach

- Location within Cornwall
- Civil parish: Breage; Landewednack
- Unitary authority: Cornwall
- Ceremonial county: Cornwall
- Region: South West
- Country: England
- Sovereign state: United Kingdom
- Police: Devon and Cornwall
- Fire: Cornwall
- Ambulance: South Western

Higher Pentreath and Lower Pentreath (Cornish: Penntreth, representing penn an treth, meaning head (of) the beach) are hamlets to the west of Praa Sands, within the parish of Breage. They are south of the A394 between Penzance and Helston in Cornwall, United Kingdom.

Pentreath Beach is a cove and beach in the parish of Landewednack on the Lizard Peninsula. It is 200 metres (660 ft) south of Kynance Cove and access is via a steep cliff path cut into the cliffs. The beach is popular with surfers as it is one of the few beaches in the area with regularly surfable waves (it is unsuitable for novice surfers because of submerged rocks and strong undercurrents).
