= Punta Carnero, Spain =

Punta Carnero
- Headland
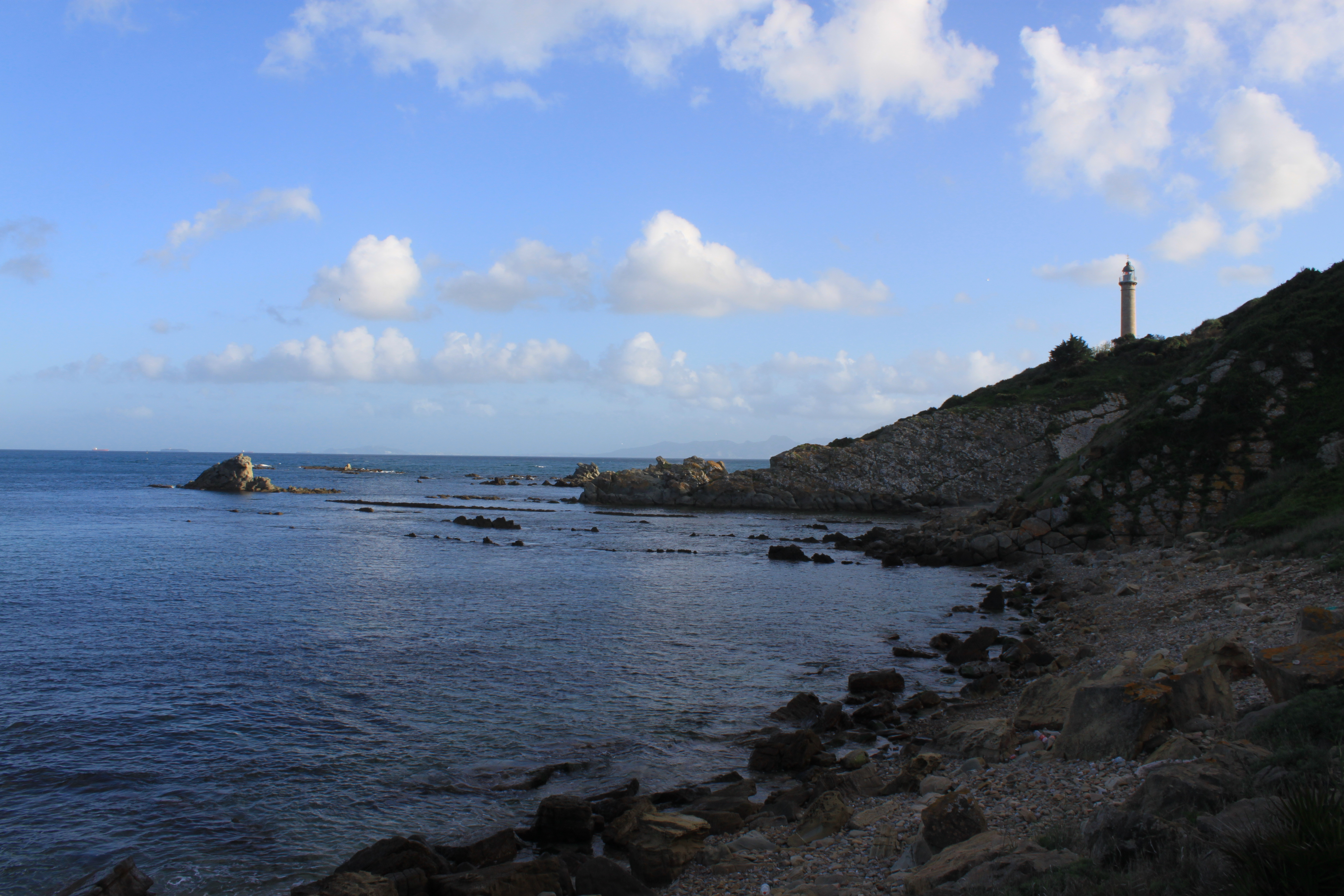
- Image of Punta Carnero and its lighthouse, with Ceuta in the background.
- Interactive map of Punta Carnero
- Coordinates: 36.0771°N 5.4253°W
- Location: Spain

Punta Carnero is a headland on the coast of Spain, near the city of Algeciras, where the eastern end of Gallows Hill descends 200 metres to meet the Mediterranean Sea. Its most prominent feature is Punta Carnero lighthouse, which marks the entrance to the Bay of Gibraltar and the Strait of Gibraltar.

Goat Island lies near the lighthouse, and the Bay of Getares begins here.

== History ==
In August 1415, a Portuguese fleet captained by King John I of Portugal held a Council of war, before carrying out the conquest of Ceuta, while anchored off Punta Carnero.

== See also ==
- Europa Point
