= Punta Carnero Lighthouse =

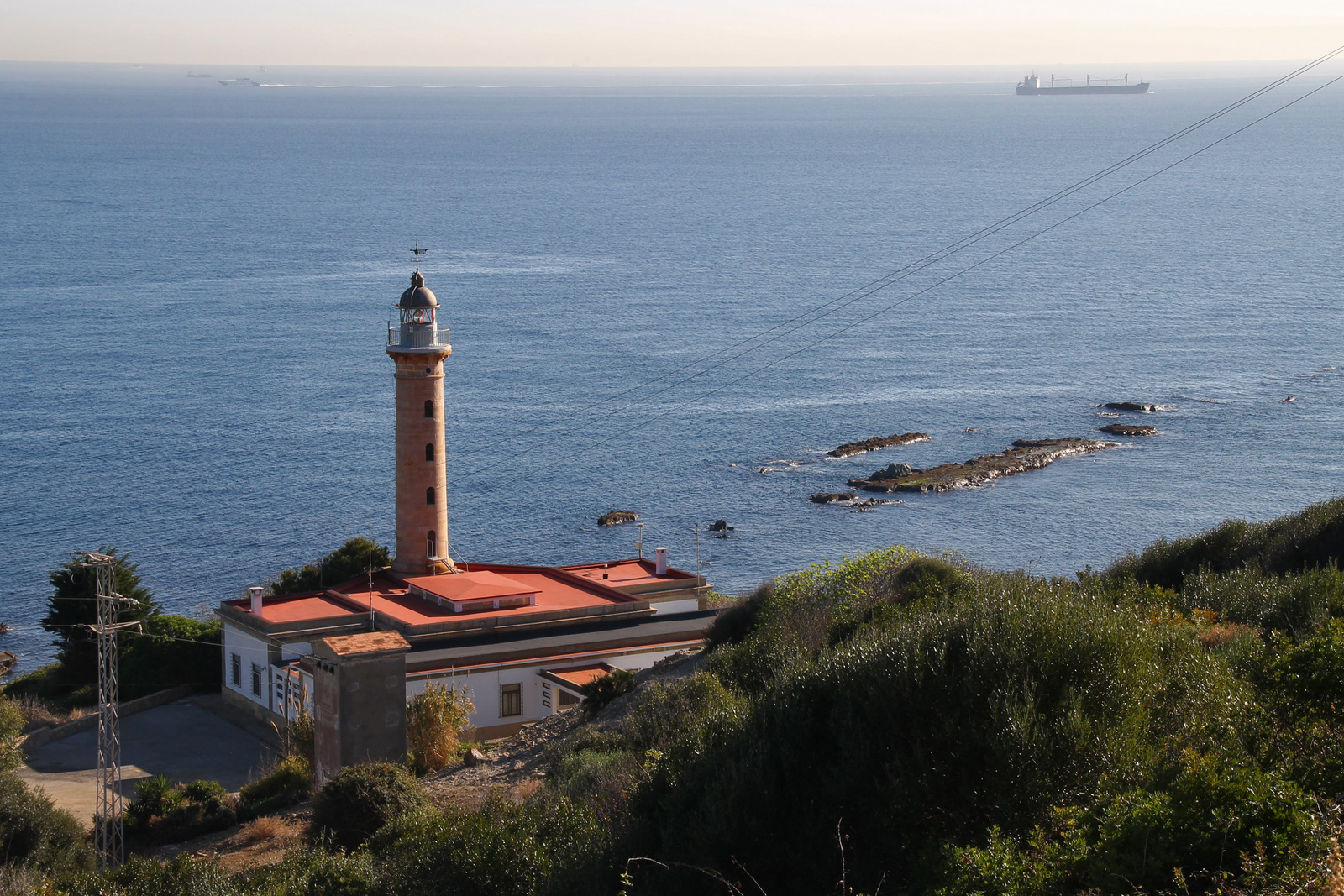
- Punta Carnero Lighthouse
- Location: Algeciras; Andalusia; Spain
- Coordinates: 36°04′37.72″N 5°25′34.46″W

Tower
- Constructed: 1874
- Construction: cut stone tower
- Height: 19 metres (62 ft)
- Shape: cylindrical tower with balcony and lantern attached to 1-storey keeper’s house
- Markings: unpainted stone tower, grey lantern
- Operator: Portuaria de la Bahía de Algeciras
- Fog signal: “K” every 30s.

Light
- Focal height: 42 metres (138 ft)
- Range: 16 nmi (30 km; 18 mi)
- Characteristic: Fl (4) WR 20s.
- Spain no.: ES-20110

Punta Carnero Lighthouse (Spanish: Faro de Punta Carnero) is an active lighthouse located on the headland known as Punta Carnero to the south of Algeciras, Spain. The lighthouse was designed and built by Jaime Font, who also designed the lighthouse at Chipiona. Opened in 1874, it overlooks the Strait of Gibraltar.

== See also ==
- List of lighthouses in Spain
