= Palmones =

- Village
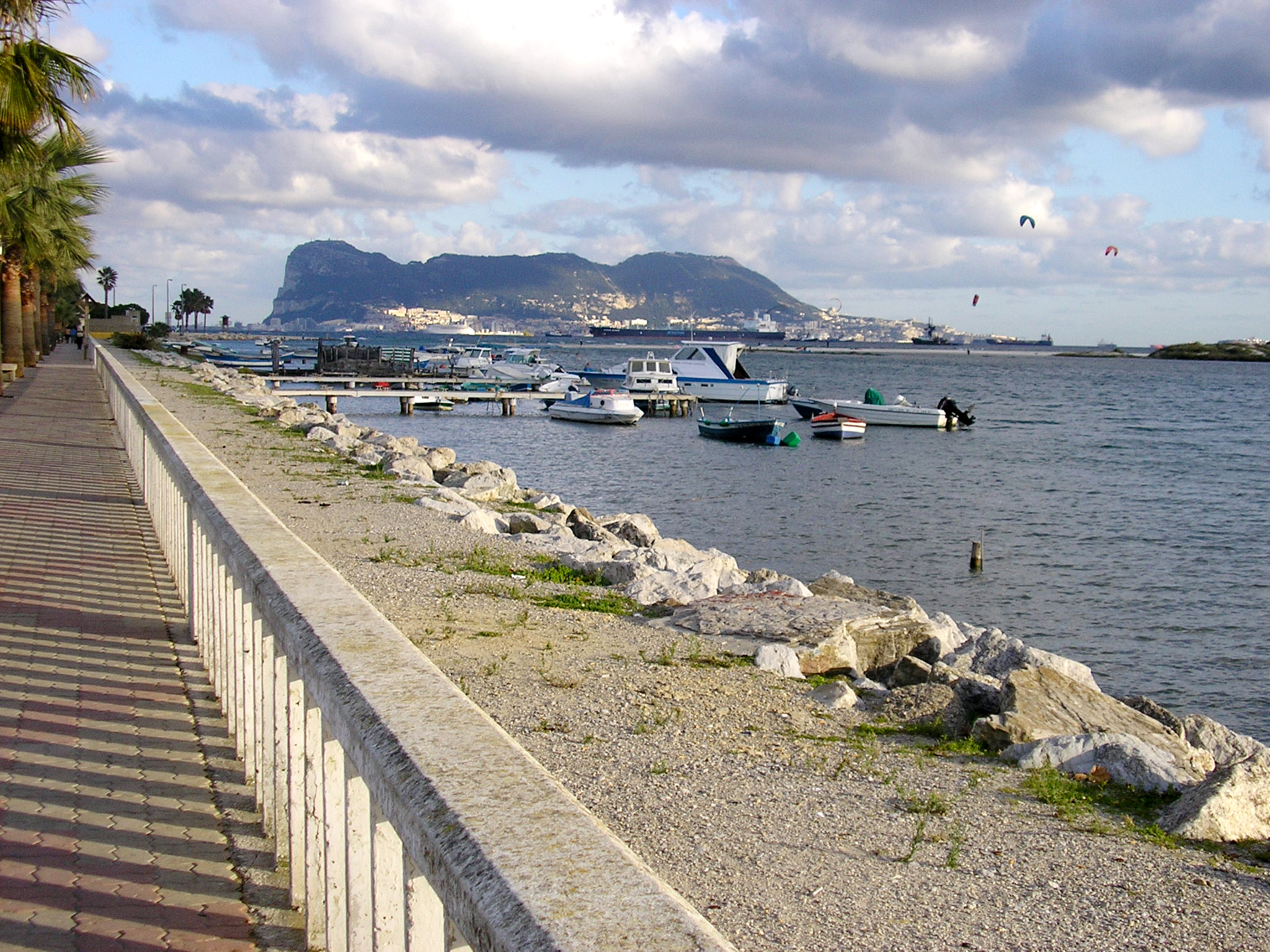
- Promenade near the mouth of the Palmones River

- Location within Spain
- Coordinates: 36°11′0″N 5°26′0″W
- Country: Spain
- Autonomous community: Andalusia
- Province: Cádiz

Palmones is a village on the Bay of Gibraltar between Algeciras and La Linea de la Concepcion in the Province of Cádiz in Spain. The San Roque Refinery and Los Barrios commercial centre lie on either side of the town.

The village has a waterfront promenade with benches, offering views of the Palmones estuary and river. The harbor is prone to oil spillage and is a catchment area for waste and garbage of yachts and other boats moored at Algeciras or Gibraltar. The beach is busy in summer and there is a beach bar that serves tapas and drinks.

There is a picturesque island in the river mouth. Although many tourists wish to swim there, the current is strong and can only be mastered by strong swimmers in low tide conditions.

Palmones has an abundance of fish restaurants.
