= Playa de Sobrevela =

Beach in the Province of Cádiz, Andalusia, Spain

Coordinates: 36.19030°N 5.33168°W

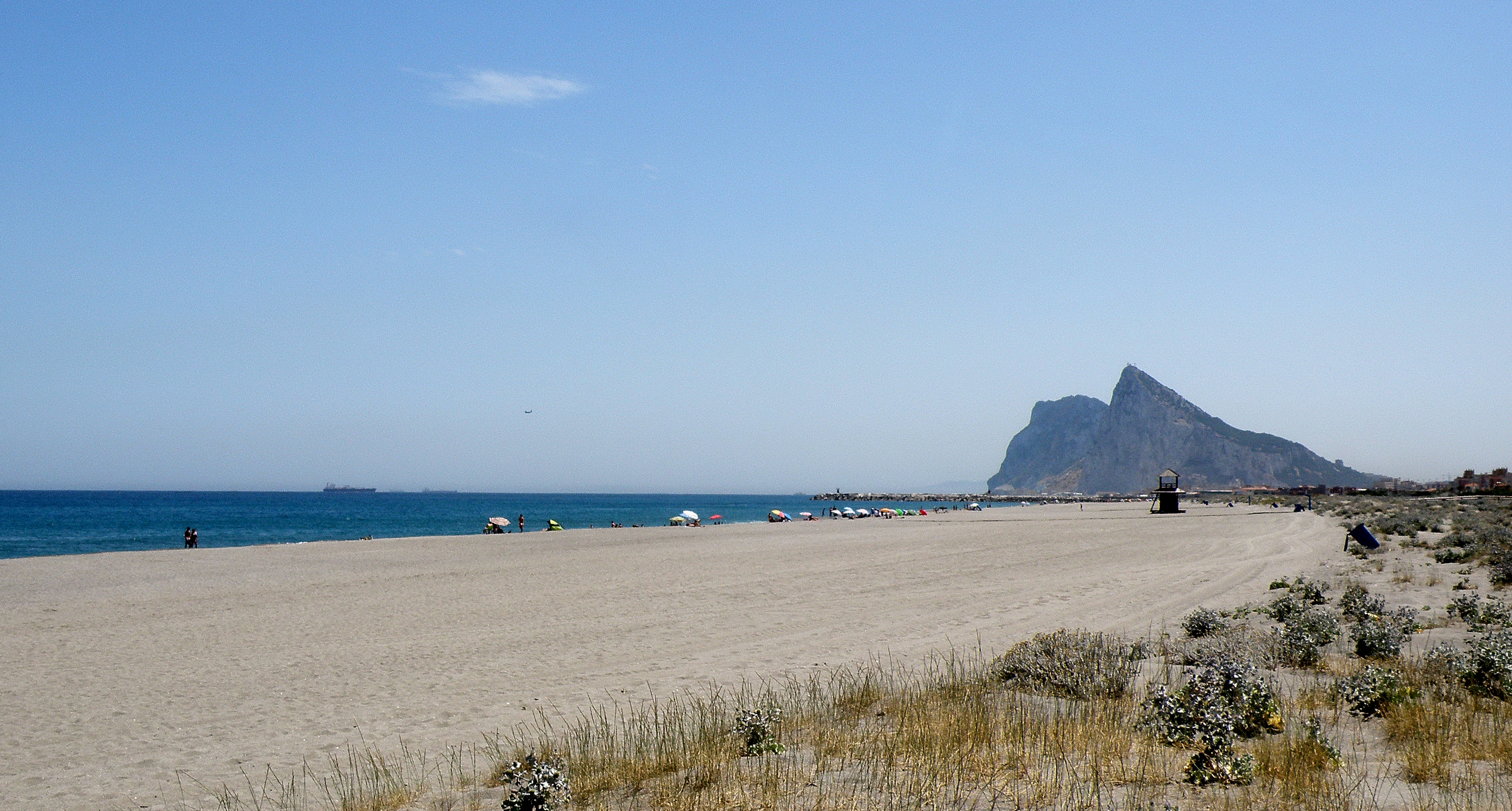
Playa de Sobrevela

Playa de Sobrevela is a beach in the municipality of La Línea de la Concepción, in the Province of Cádiz, Andalusia, Spain. It has a length of about 2.0 kilometres (1.2 mi) and average width of about 150 metres (490 ft). It is a busy beach north of the city and bordered to the south with the Playa de La Atunara and to the north with the Playa de Torrenueva.
