= Playa de La Alcaidesa =

Beach in La Línea de la Concepción, Province of Cádiz, Spain

Playa de La Alcaidesa is a beach in the municipalities of La Línea de la Concepción and San Roque, in the Province of Cádiz, Andalusia, Spain. It is a blue flag beach with calm waters, unspoilt vegetation, and relatively low-medium occupancy. The beach is accessed from the nearby coastal town of La Alcaidesa. It has a length of about 4.3 kilometres (2.7 mi) and average width of about 60 metres (200 ft).

To the south lies La Playa de La Hacienda in the direction of Santa Margarita and La Línea. To the north lies Punta Mala and the lighthouse El Faro de Carbonera, also known as El Torre de Punta Mala. Playa de La Alcaidesa stretches along the Mediterranean coast offering views of the Rock of Gibraltar and Morocco. The beach has few amenities, however, in high season facilities include toilets, showers, lifeguard tower, daily waste collection, and a wooden accessibility ramp for wheelchair users.

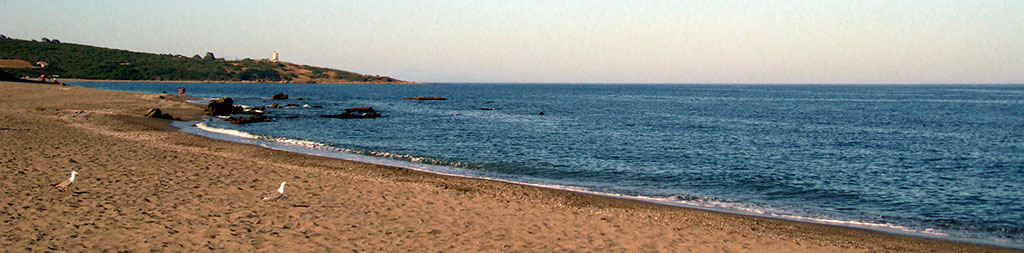
La Alcaidesa beach.
