= Nuestra Señora del Carmen (La Línea de la Concepción) =

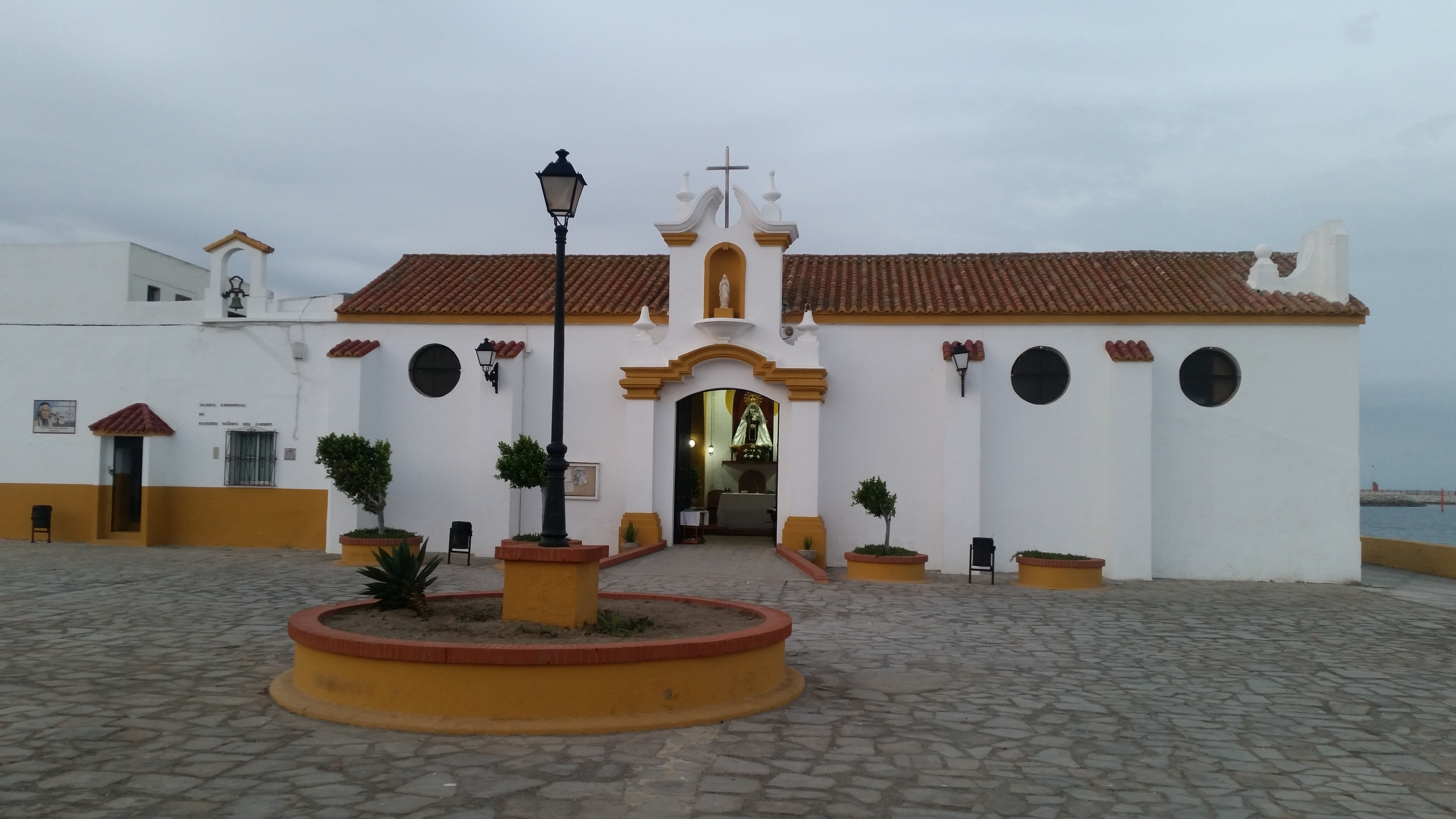
- Nuestra Señora del Carmen (La Línea de la Concepción)
- 36°10′34.9″N 5°20′10.3″W
- Location: Calle Cartagena, 7C; 11300 La Línea de la Concepción (Cádiz)
- Country: Spain
- Denomination: Roman Catholic

History
- Founded: 1944

Nuestra Señora del Carmen (Our Lady of Mount Carmel in English) is a parish church in la Atunara, La Línea de la Concepción, Andalusia, Spain. The feast day is on 16 July known locally as the 'Festividad de la Virgen del Carmen'.
