= Carbonera Lighthouse =

Lighthouse in Andalusia, Spain

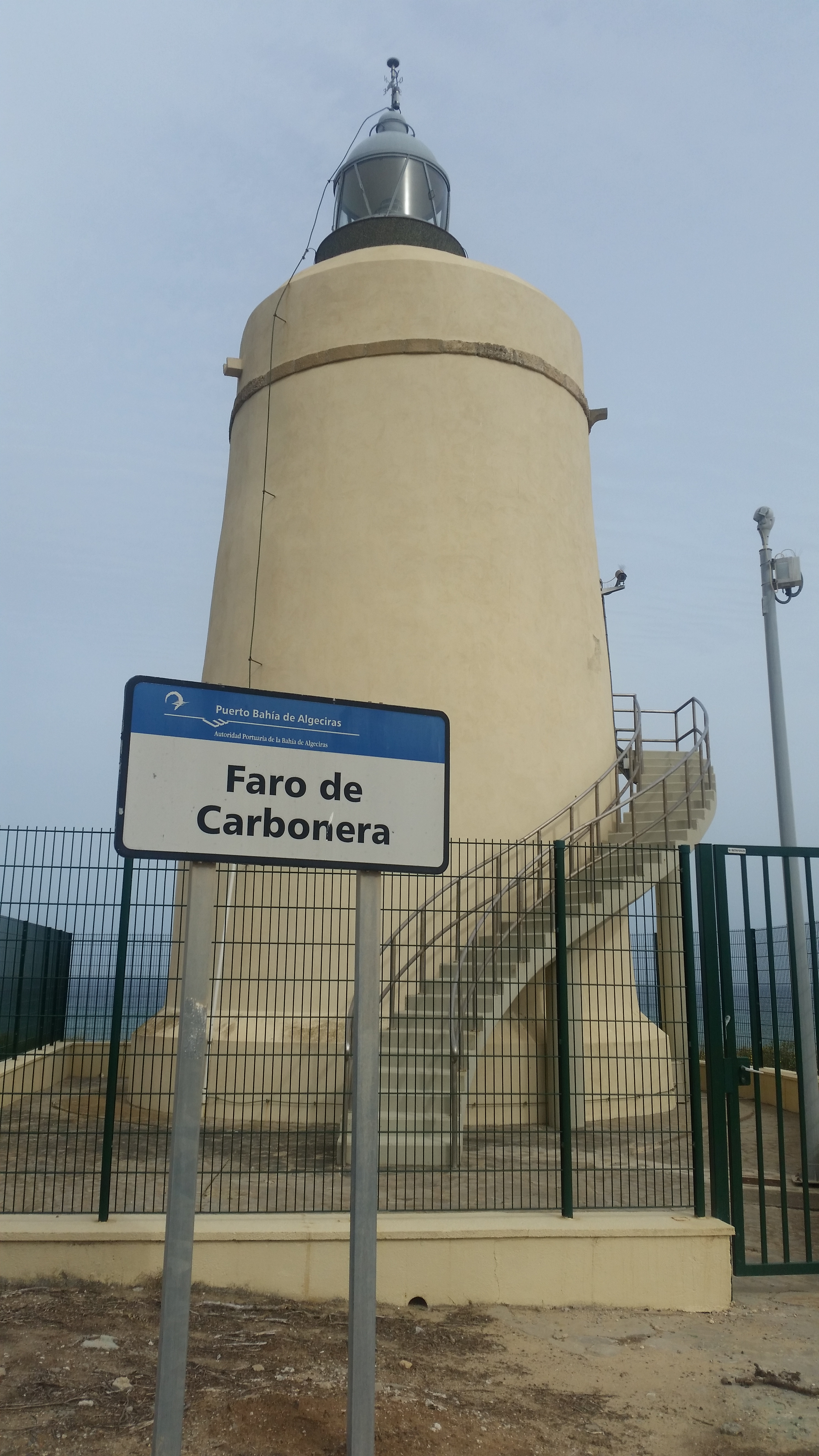
- Carbonera Lighthouse
- Location: La Alcaidesa; Andalusia; Spain
- Coordinates: 36°14′40″N 5°18′05″W

Tower
- Constructed: 1588
- Height: 14 metres (46 ft)
- Shape: cylindrical tower with balcony and lantern attached to 1-storey keeper’s house
- Operator: Portuaria de la Bahía de Algeciras
- Heritage: Bien de Interés Cultural, Bien de Interés Cultural

Light
- Focal height: 39 metres (128 ft)
- Range: 14 nmi (26 km; 16 mi)
- Characteristic: L 3 oc 1

El Faro de Carbonera, registered officially as Torre Carbonera, or Torre de Punta Mala, is an active lighthouse located on Punta Mala, in the coastal town of La Alcaidesa, Spain, overlooking the Strait of Gibraltar. The lighthouse is situated in the municipality of San Roque and lies north of the Playa de La Alcaidesa.

It is protected as a monument of cultural interest (Bien de Interés Cultural) by Spain's Ministry of Culture under the General Catalogue of Andalusian Historical Heritage, and is managed by the Port Authority of Algeciras (Autoridad Portuaria de la Bahía de Algeciras).

Although not open to the public for visits, the lighthouse can be accessed via several dirt tracks leading up from the beach. There is a small ruin of the Casa de Carbonera (charcoal-maker's house) next to the lighthouse.

== History ==
Originally a 16th-century watchtower commissioned by King Felipe II and built in 1588, it was later restored in the 18th-century. It was envisioned to be converted from tower to lighthouse under the Maritime Signalling Plan in 1984, and the conversion project from tower to lighthouse – as presented by the civil engineer Carlos Prieto and the architect Enrique Martinez Tercero – was taken from a Contest of Ideas to Build Lighthouses in 1988, and it began working as an active lighthouse in 1989.

It was included into the Port of Algeciras Bay Authority’s Conservation & Historical Asset Enhancement Plan in 2021.

== See also ==
- List of lighthouses in Spain
