= La Línea de la Concepción Bus Station =

Bus station in Cádiz

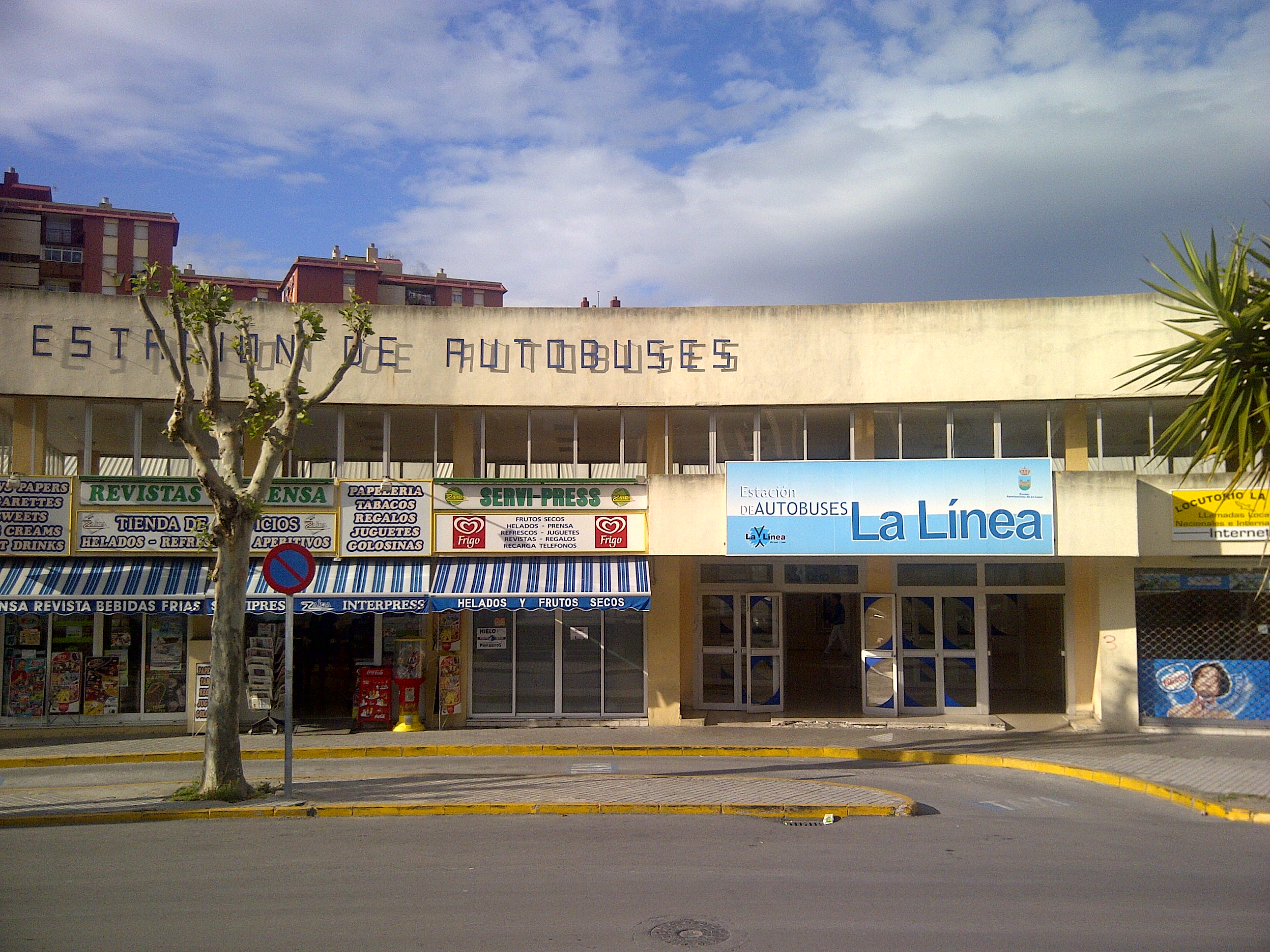

General information
- Location: La Línea de la Concepción; Province of Cádiz
- Coordinates: 36°9′28″N 5°21′1″W
- Bus operators: Comes: Cádiz, Jerez de la Frontera, Sevilla; CTSA-Portillo: Málaga; ALSA: Granada, Córdoba, Spain, Barcelona; Daibus: Madrid
Location

La Línea de la Concepción Bus Station (Spanish: Estación de Autobuses de La Línea de la Concepción) is a bus station serving the Spanish municipality of La Línea de la Concepción in the Andalusian Province of Cádiz. It is the terminal of the regular services of buses in this city and is managed by the company CTSA-Portillo.

It is located at the Plaza de Europa and is 300 metres (980 ft) from the Gibraltar-Spain border. Gibraltar does not have its own long distance bus station so this station also serves Gibraltarians who wish to travel through Spain by bus.
