= La Atunara =

- Barriada (pedanía)
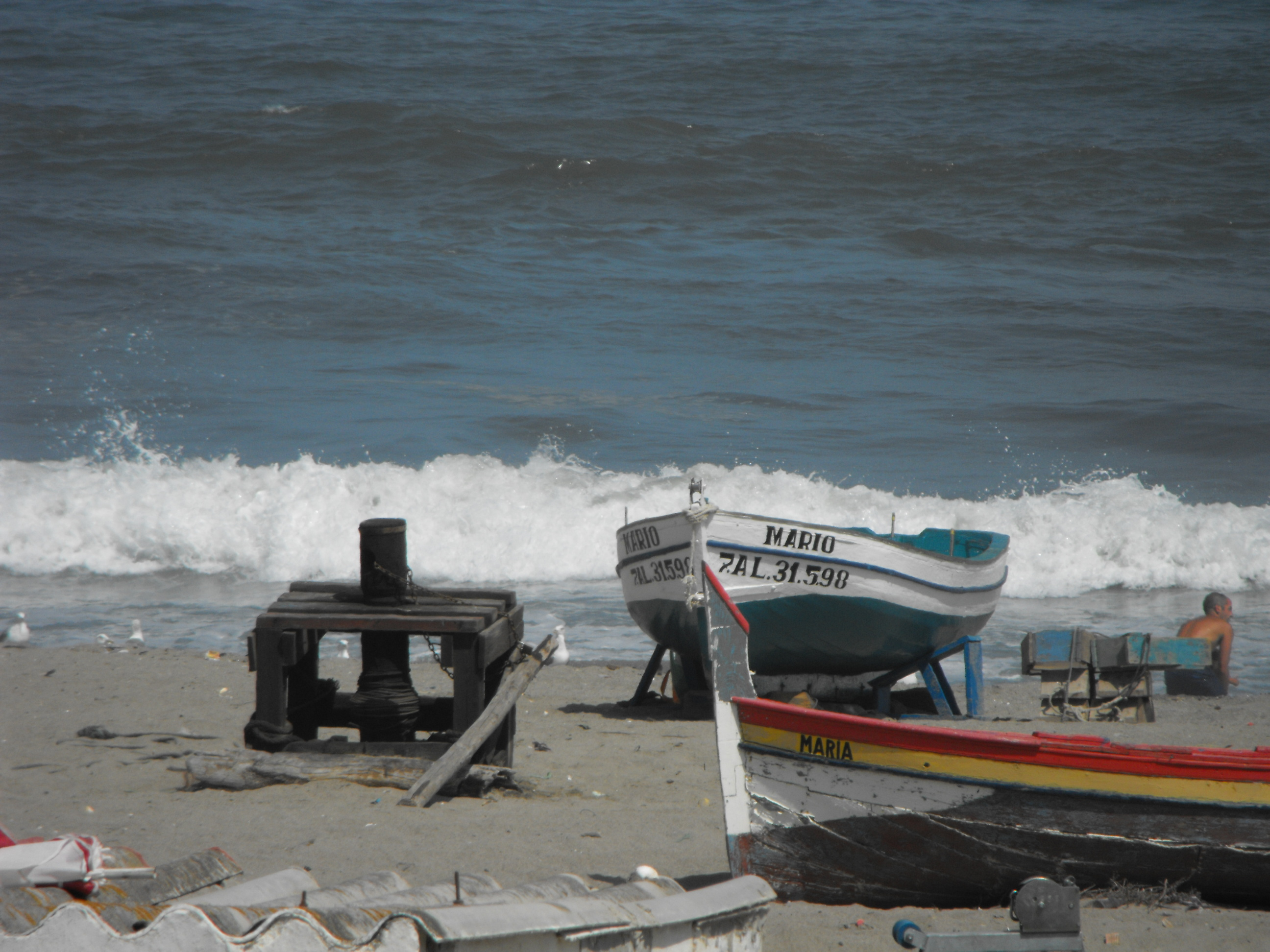

- Location in the Province of Cádiz La Atunara (Andalusia) La Atunara (Spain)
- Coordinates: 36°10′24″N 5°20′13″W
- Country: Spain
- Autonomous community: Andalusia
- Province: Cádiz
- Comarca: Campo de Gibraltar
- Municipality: La Línea de la Concepción
- Judicial district: Algeciras
- Time zone: UTC+1 (CET)
  - Summer (DST): UTC+2 (CEST)
- Official language(s): Spanish

La Atunara known also as just Atunara is a suburb and the fishing port area of La Línea de la Concepción in the Province of Cádiz, Andalucia, Spain. People from this area are known as 'Atunareños'. The beach named after the area known as Playa de La Atunara, is one of the most popular in the area.

== History ==
Atunara was mentioned in a Royal Dispatch of 6 March 1634, being under the jurisdiction of the "Tercio del Mar de Marbella y Estepona" in the Kingdom of Granada (Crown of Castile) and is thus the oldest existing settlement in what is now La Linea de la Concepcion.

Traditional tuna fishing called Almadraba was the main source of employment in Atunara until the 1990s when it saw a decline and the area has since had a high level of unemployment and has since been an area known for smuggling tobacco and Hashish.
