= Playa de Levante (La Línea de la Concepción) =

Beach in the Province of Cádiz, Spain

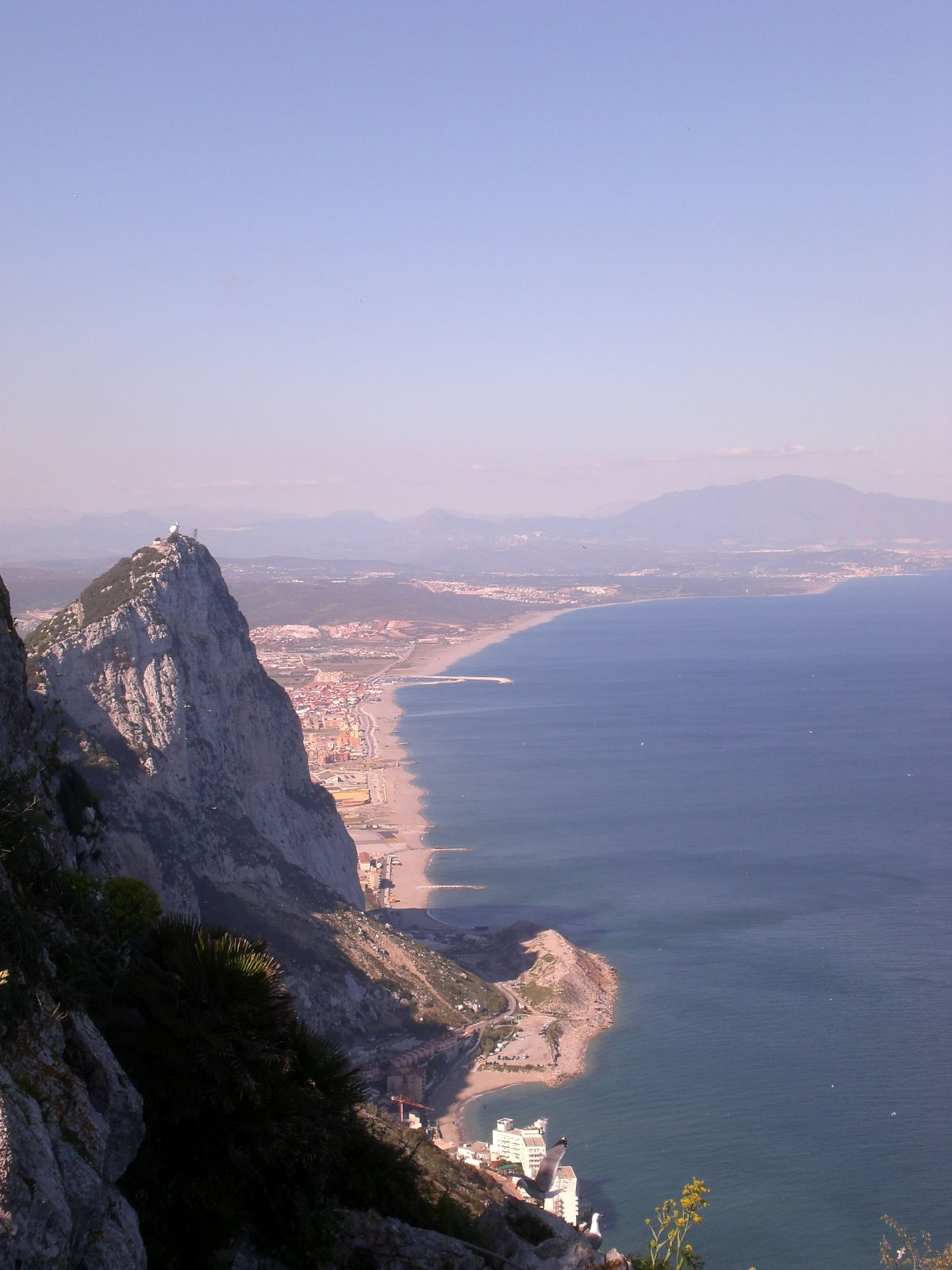
View from Gibraltar

Playa de Levante (English: East beach) is a beach in the municipality of La Línea de la Concepción, in the Province of Cádiz, Andalusia, Spain, located to the north of Gibraltar. It has a length of about 2.2 kilometres (1.4 mi) and average width of about 30 metres (98 ft). It is a busy beach promenade enclosed by the city and on the south by the Playa de Santa Bárbara and the north of Playa de La Atunara. It has all the basic services required of an urban beach, daily waste collection season, toilets, showers and disabled access and presence of police and local rescue equipment.
