= Torre Nueva (La Línea de la Concepción) =

Torre Nueva (New Tower)
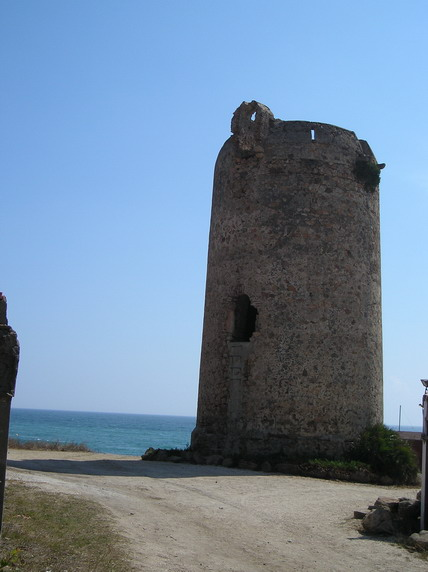

- Location within Spain
- 36°12′30″N 5°19′32″W
- Location: La Línea de la Concepción, Spain

History
- Built: 16th century

Spanish Cultural Heritage
- Official name: Torre Nueva
- Type: Non-movable in ruins
- Criteria: Monument

The Torre Nueva, also called Torrenueva and sometimes Torre Sabá, is a beacon located in the Andalusian town of La Línea de la Concepción and is one of the 44 towers of the same characteristics that dotted the Spanish coast from the river Guadiaro to the border with Portugal. All of them were built during the reign of Felipe III, along with others located along the Mediterranean coast from Málaga to Catalonia.

The purpose of these watchtowers was to warn the coastal population of the presence of Berber pirate ships, for which smoke signals and bonfires were used. At the top of each tower, there was always a bundle of dry wood to be burned immediately in case of danger, transmitting the alarm signal to the towers nearby.

The Torre Nueva communicated visually with the Torre Nueva de Guadiaro and the Torre Carbonera. As of 2017 it is in a relatively good state of conservation, integrated with the beach of Playa de Torrenueva to which it gives its name.

It is a circular tower 7.25 meters (23.8 ft) in diameter and 12 meters (39 ft) high, with a brick-domed interior room 4.4 meters (14 ft) meters in diameter and 7.5 meters (25 ft) high, which is accessed through a door located 3.7 meters (12 ft) above the ground. In this room was a hearth for the guards of the tower, a secondary door that allowed ascent to the roof by means of a spiral staircase integrated into the walls, and a window. The roof has a parapet of a little more than a meter in height, in which a machicolation is located on the same level as the door, with scaffolds to its sides.

This tower was capable of housing 5 men (4 soldiers and a corporal), and at its feet was stationed a guard corps consisting of a corporal and 6 soldiers of infantry and a corporal and 4 soldiers of cavalry.

The Torre Nueva was declared a national monument on April 22, 1949.
