= Santa Margarita (La Línea de la Concepción) =

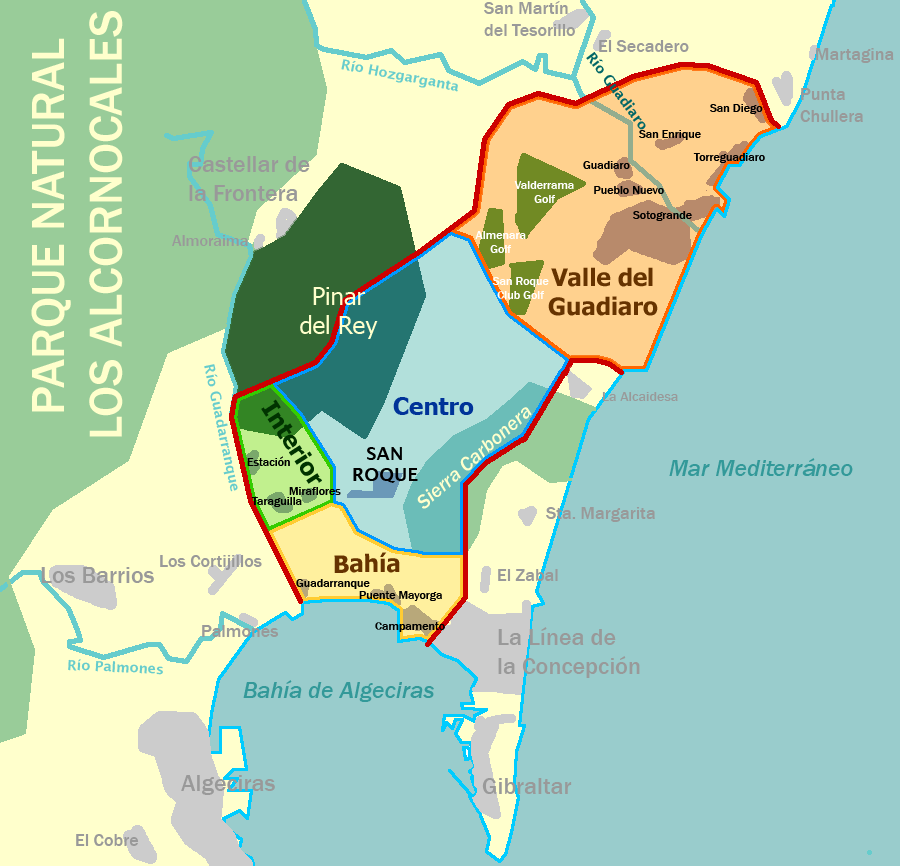
- Santa Margarita in relation to nearby settlements
- Interactive map of Santa Margarita
- Coordinates: 36°12′21.8″N 5°20′23.2″W
- Country: Spain
- Autonomous community: Andalusia
- Province: Cádiz
- Comarca: Campo de Gibraltar
- Municipality: La Línea de la Concepción
- Judicial district: Algeciras
- Time zone: UTC+1 (CET)
  - Summer (DST): UTC+2 (CEST)

Santa Margarita is a residential town in the northern suburb of La Línea de la Concepción in the Province of Cádiz, Andalucia, Spain. Santa Margarita is only partially developed in accordance with its development plan.

== History ==
Santa Margarita is a residential town a stone's throw away from Gibraltar on the outskirts of La Línea de La Concepcion. It has postcode 11315.

In July 2016 a wildfire forced the evacuation of some of the properties in Santa Margarita.

In January 2017 La Linea Council had meetings with Novarent, to investigate building another urbanization on 60 hectares of land called Cortijo de San Antonio which is bordered on the south by the Venta Melchor urbanization in Santa Margarita, with the idea of calling it 'English City' to attract more British people to the area and provide an economic impulse which is much needed by the local community. The town hall has ambitious plans to generate a substantial number of jobs and ensure that the project delivers on this front.
