= Playa de Poniente (La Línea de la Concepción) =

Beach in Cádiz, Andalusia, Spain

- Beach
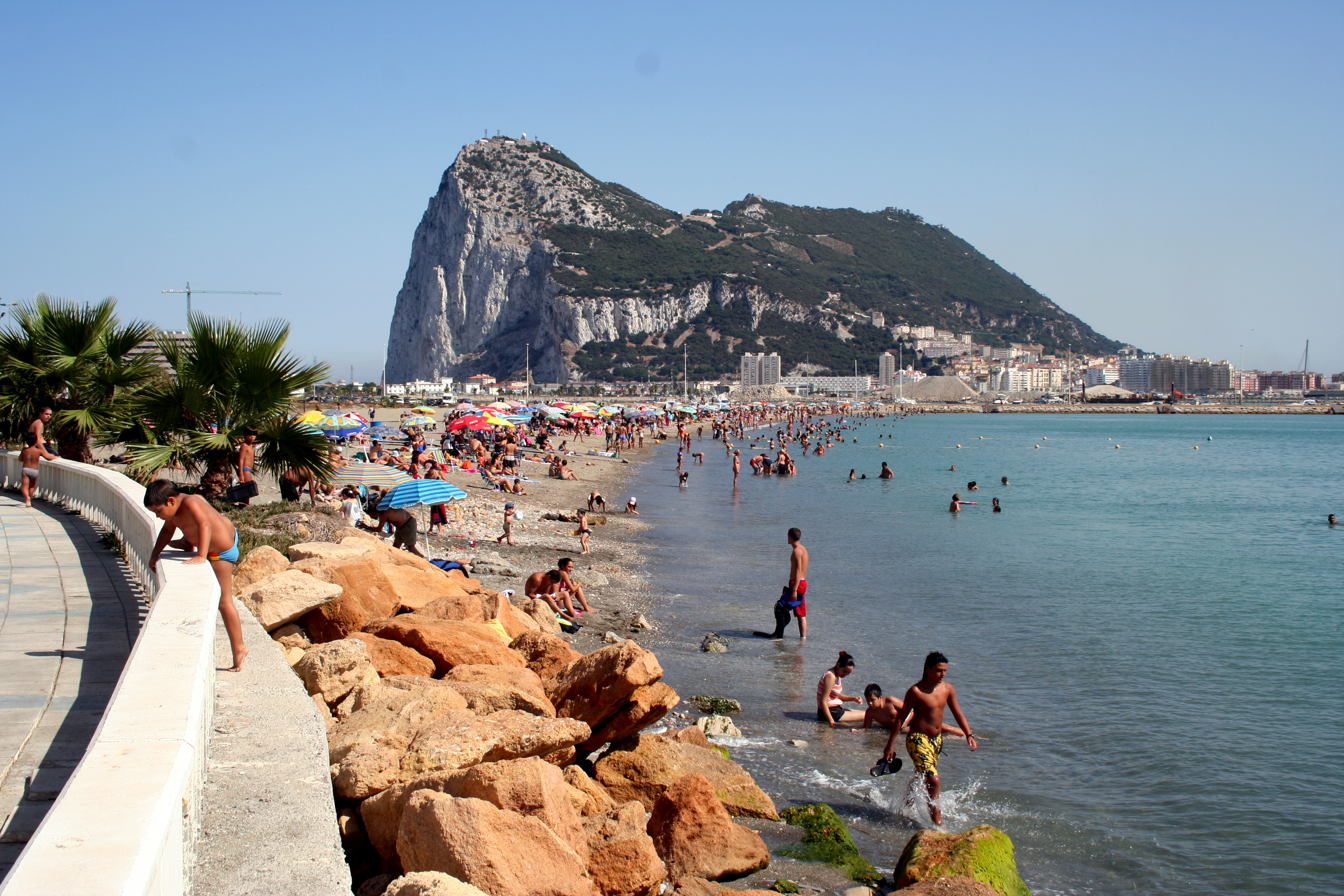
- View of Gibraltar from Playa de Poniente
- Interactive map of Playa de Poniente
- Coordinates: 36°09′43.3″N 5°21′26.5″W
- Location: La Línea de la Concepción, in the Province of Cádiz, Andalusia, Spain

Dimensions
  - Length: 800 metres (approx.)
- Access: Av. Príncipe de Asturias

Playa de Poniente (English: West beach) is a beach in the municipality of La Línea de la Concepción, in the Province of Cádiz, Andalusia, Spain, located to the northwest of Gibraltar. It has a length of about 800 metres (2,600 ft) and average width of about 20 metres (66 ft).
