= Parque Municipal Reina Sofía =

Park in La Línea de la Concepción, Cádiz, Spain

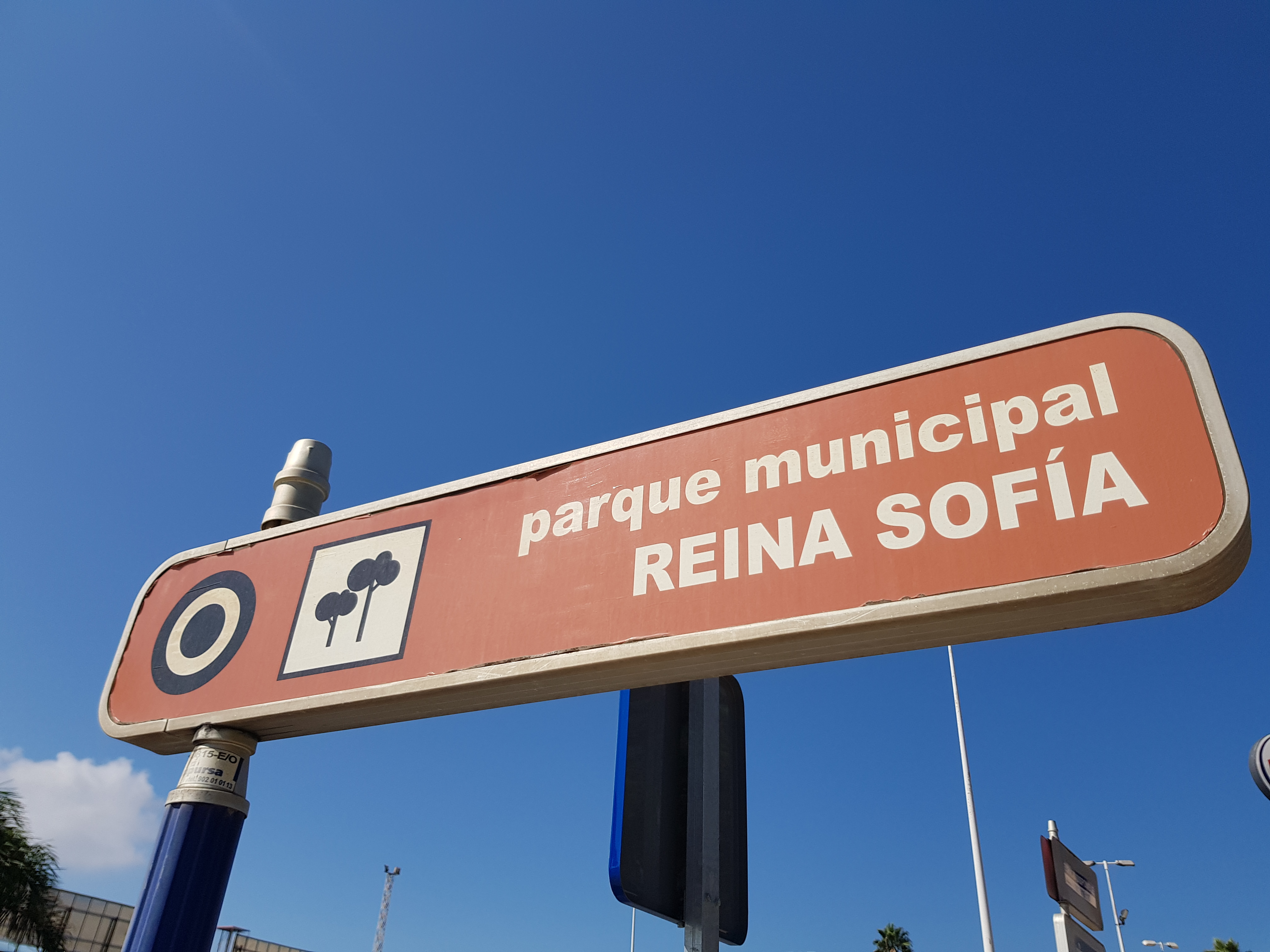
- Parque Municipal Reina Sofía
- Interactive map of Parque Municipal Reina Sofía
- Type: Public park
- Location: La Línea de la Concepción, Spain
- Coordinates: 36°09′28.7″N 5°20′42.6″W
- Created: 1969
- Operator: Los Locos del parque
- Status: Open year round

Parque Municipal Reina Sofía is a park in La Línea de la Concepción, Spain. The park was known as the Parque Princesa Sofía, named after Sofia of Greece, when she became queen the park was renamed to Reina in 1975. It has an approximate area of 17.86 hectares.

El Piojito, is the street market that occurs every Wednesday in the Park. The Feria de La Línea is celebrated here every year.

There are bunkers from the time of the Spanish Civil War, a skate park, a dog park, Playground and many trees including Dragon tree, Platanus × hispanica, Chorisia speciosa, Ceratonia siliqua, Morus alba, Acer negundo, Jacaranda mimosifolia, Melia azedarach, Olea europaea, Cupressus sempervirens, Pinus pinea.

== Gallery ==
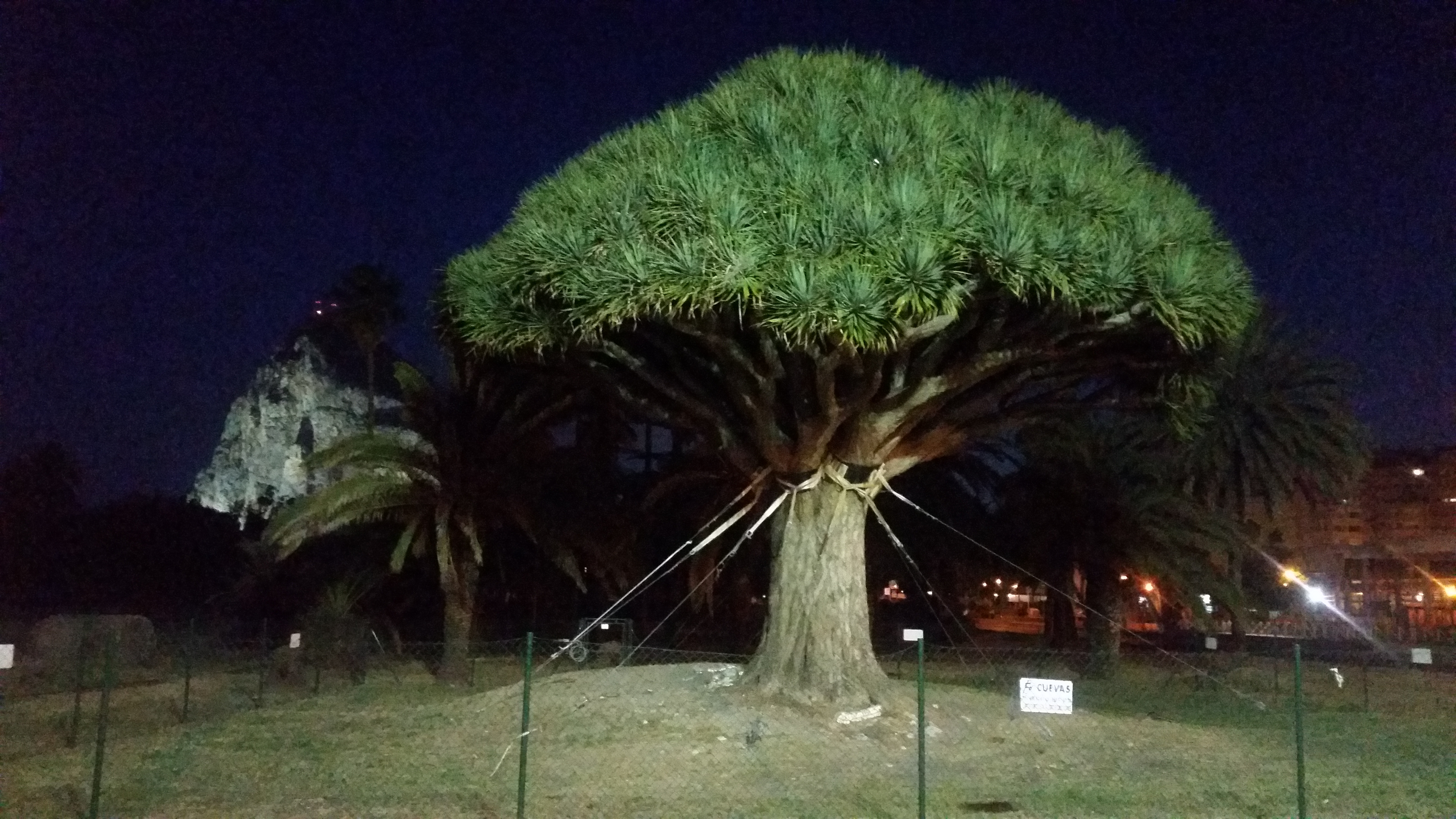

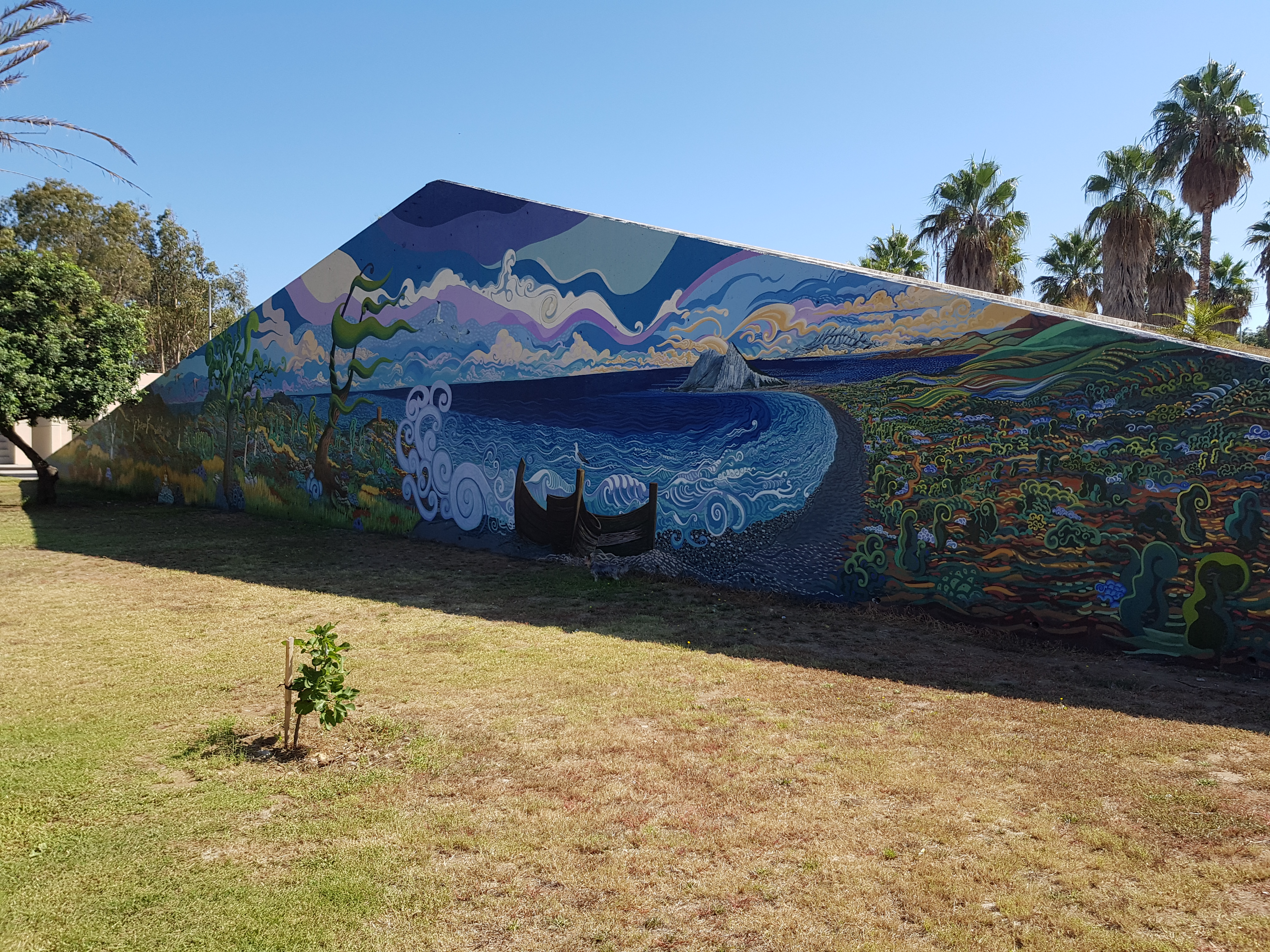

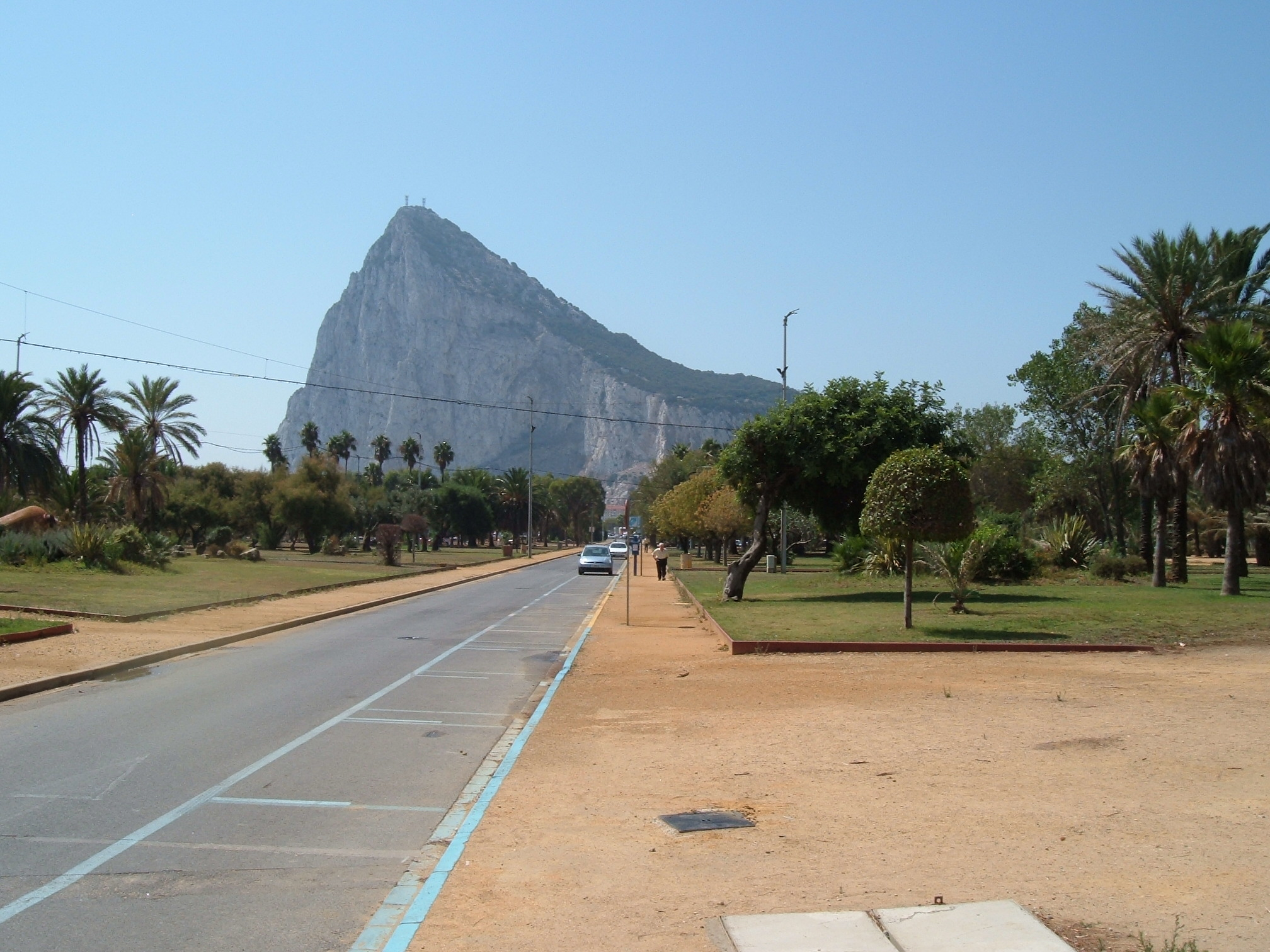

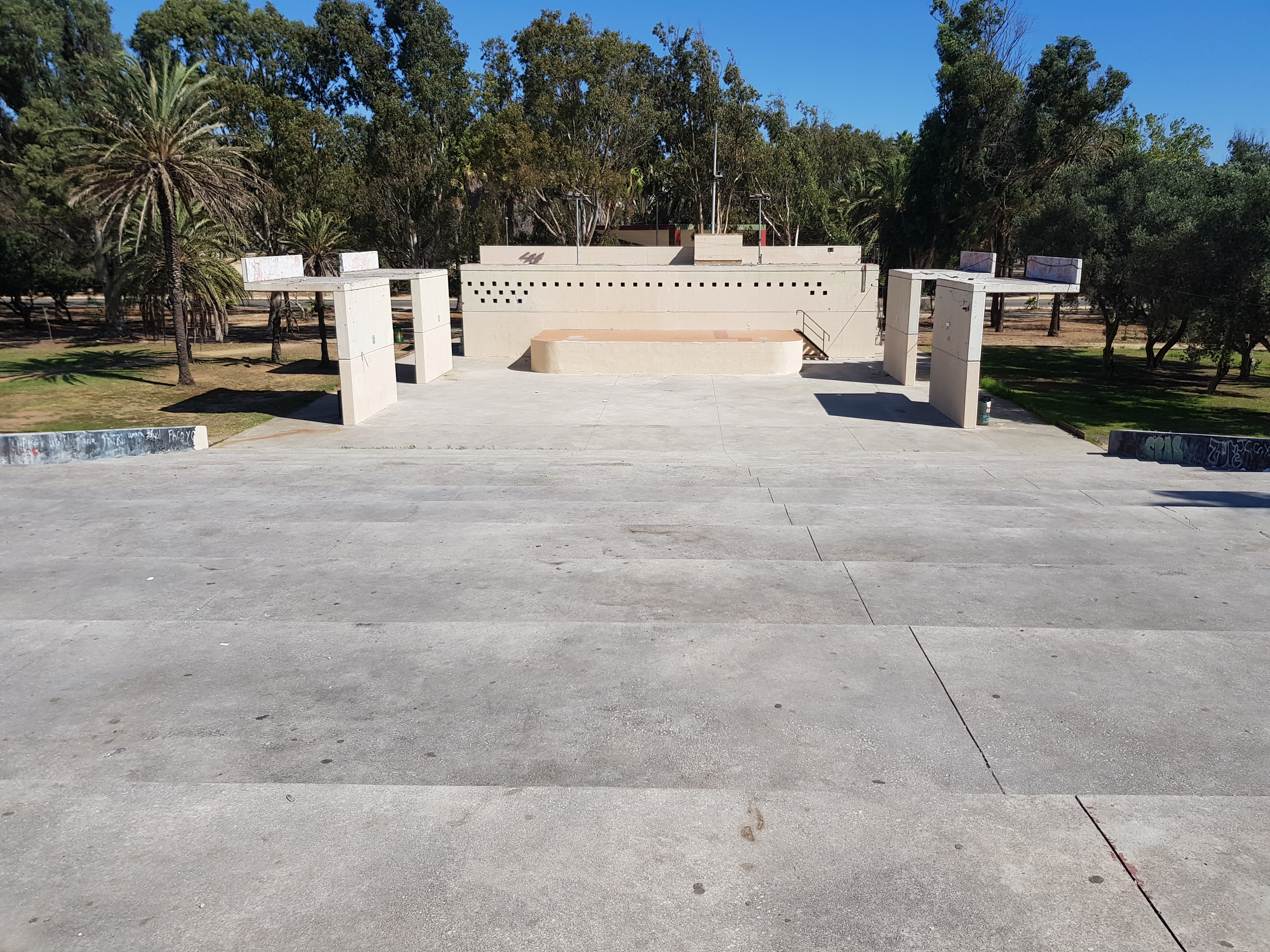

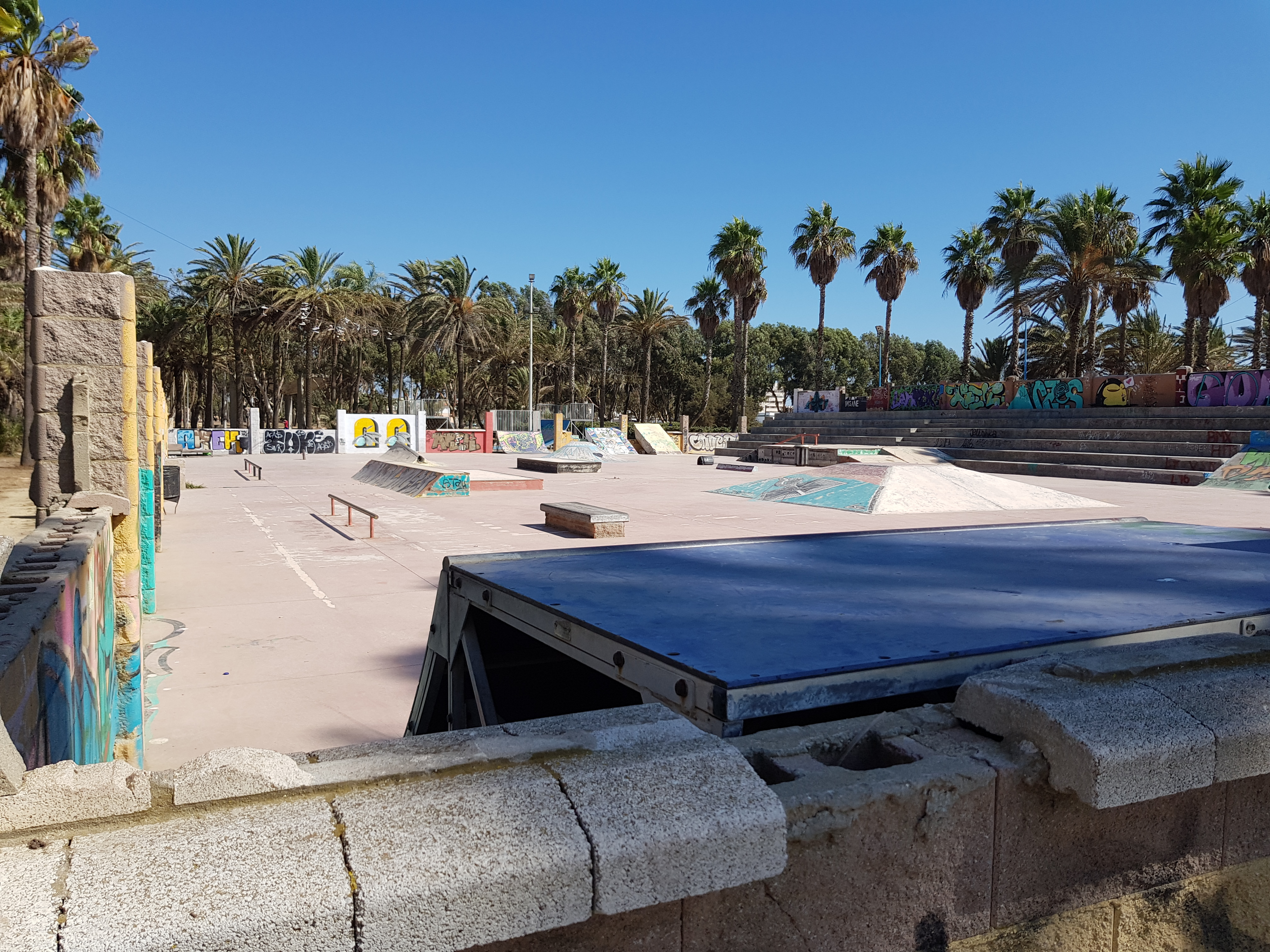
