= La Línea de la Concepción Bullring =

Plaza de Toros de La Línea de la Concepción
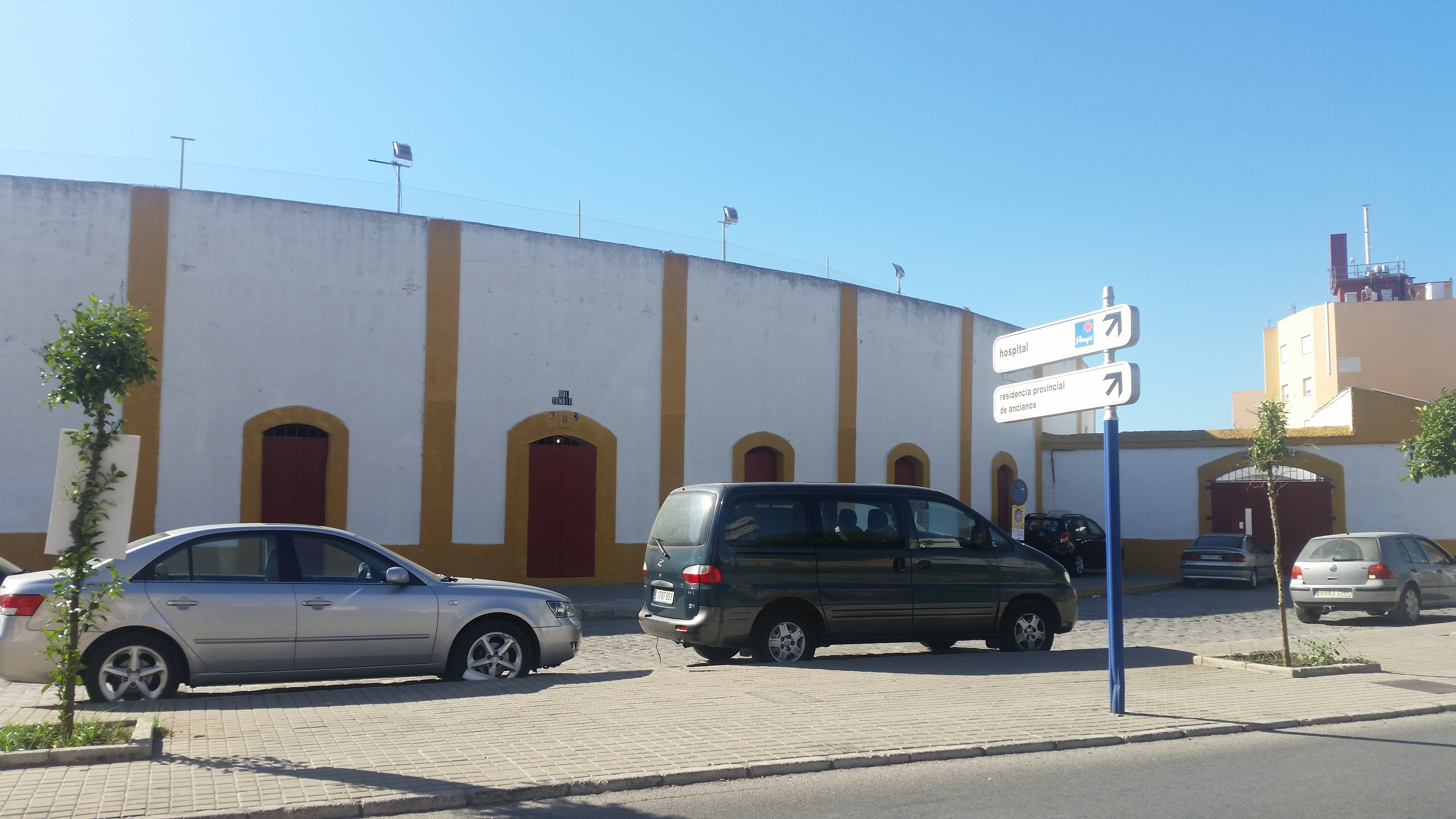
- Interactive map of the Plaza de Toros de La Línea de la Concepción area

General information
- Type: Bull Ring
- Location: La Línea de la Concepción, Spain
- Coordinates: 36.168°N 5.347°W
- Construction started: 1880
- Opening: May 1883; 142 years ago

Technical details
- Floor area: 5,360 square metres

Design and construction
- Architect: Adolfo del Castillo

The bull ring in La Línea de la Concepción (Spanish: Plaza de Toros de la Línea de la Concepción), a town in the province of Cádiz at the southern edge of Spain, close to the British territory of Gibraltar, was opened in 1883.

== history ==
The bull ring is said to be unusual in that it has an odd number of sides. With 49 sides it is however nearly circular and it also has eleven entrances. The building was designed by Adolfo del Castillo and built on the Plaza de Arenal. It is now one of the oldest buildings in the town. The bull ring was built between 1880 and 1883 in a typical Andalusian style just thirteen years after the municipality was established. The bull ring is said to be a centre for meeting people including those from the nearby peninsula of Gibraltar. This may account for its original capacity being 6,000 people despite the town's population only being 5,000 at the time.

The building was partially removed in the 1980s but is still listed as being of special interest (Spanish: Bien de Interés Cultural) by the Spanish Government.

The diameter of the bull ring at 59 metres (194 ft) which gives a floor area of over 5,000 square metres (54,000 ft^{2}). The diameter of the whole building is 89 metres (292 ft). In its early days the ring saw a ballooning show by the Montgolfier brothers in 1894.

Bullfights mark the end of the Feria de la Línea which is celebrated in mid-July and in recent times is the only time that a bullfight occurs.
