= Playa de Santa Bárbara =

Beach in La Línea de la Concepción, Spain

- Beach
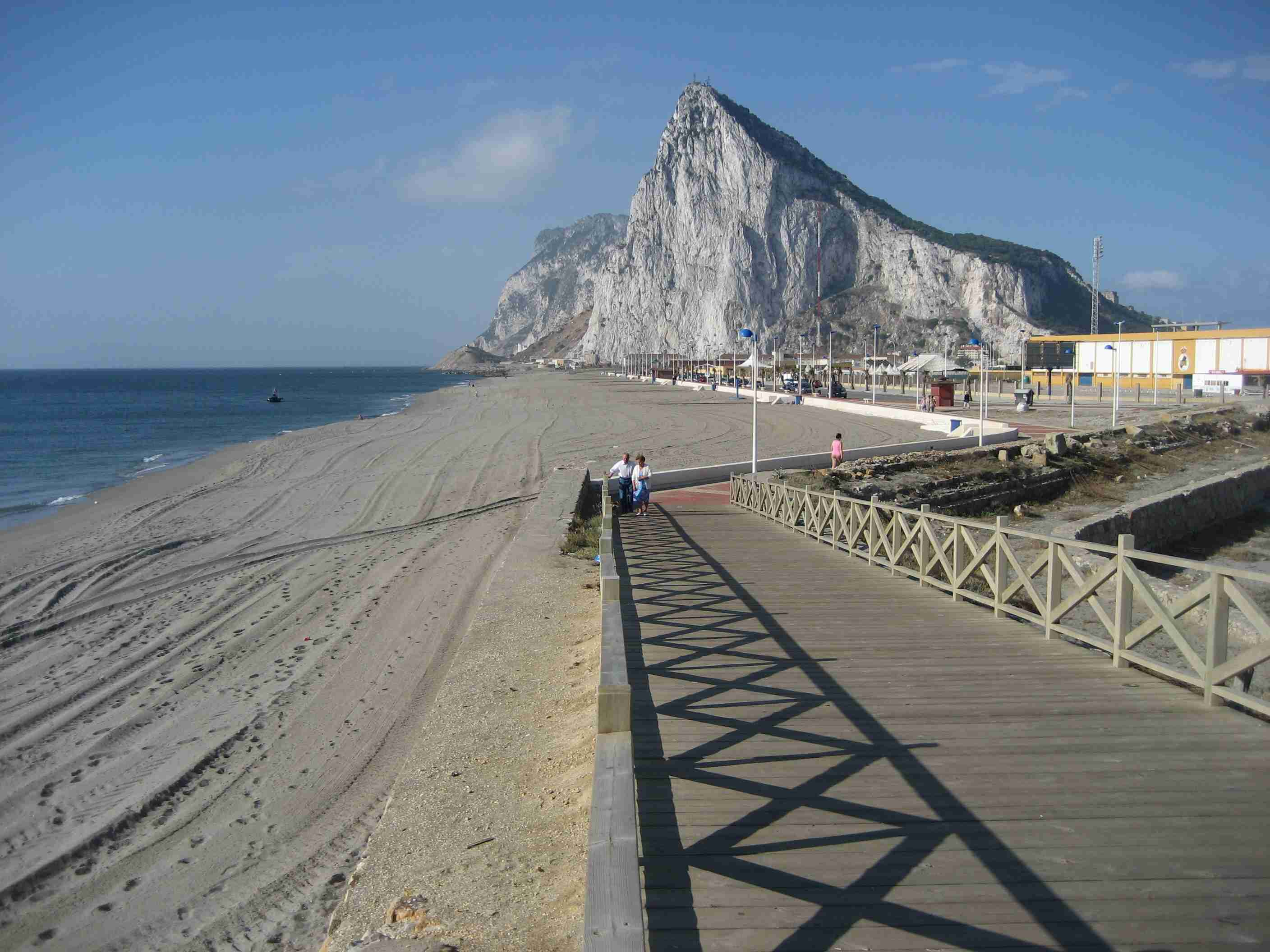
- View of Gibraltar from Playa de Santa Bárbara
- Interactive map of Playa de Santa Bárbara
- Coordinates: 36°10′3.14″N 5°20′13.34″W
- Location: La Línea de la Concepción, in the Province of Cádiz, Andalusia, Spain

Dimensions
  - Length: 700 metres (approx.)

Playa de Santa Bárbara is a beach in the municipality of La Línea de la Concepción, in the Province of Cádiz, Andalusia, Spain, located to the north of Gibraltar. It has a length of about 700 metres (2,300 ft) and average width of about 40 metres (130 ft). It is a busy beach promenade bounded by the city limits and south to the border with Gibraltar with Gibraltar Airport runway to the east and on the north by the Playa de Levante. In its vicinity are the remains of the Fort of Santa Barbara, an old fortification that participated in the Great Siege of Gibraltar in 1779. It has all the basic services required of an urban beach, daily waste collection season, toilets, showers and disabled access and presence of police and local rescue equipment.
