= La Alcaidesa =

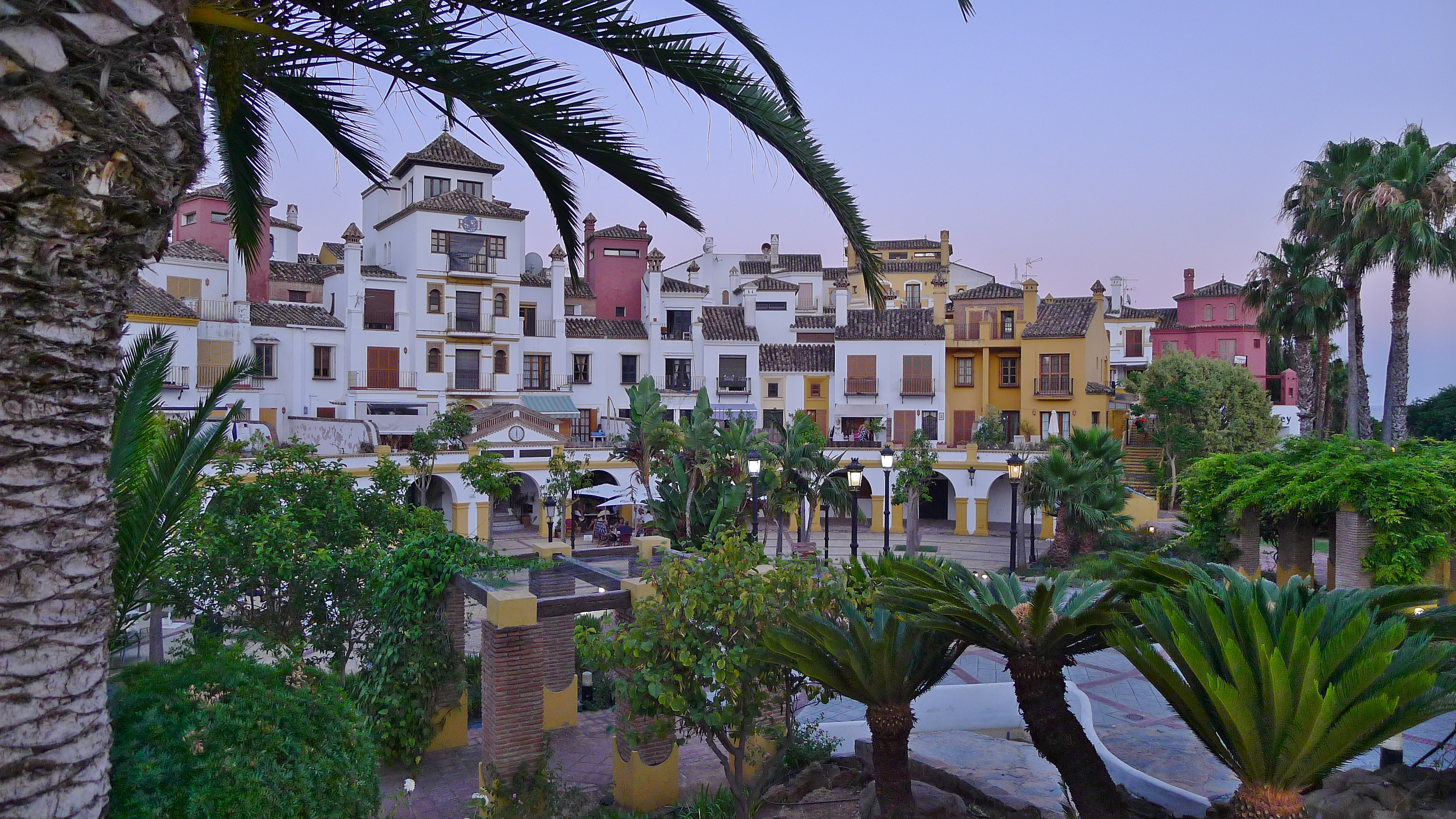
- Loma del Rey Square

- Location in Spain La Alcaidesa (Andalusia) La Alcaidesa (Spain)
- Coordinates: 36°14′07″N 5°19′09″W
- Country: Spain
- Autonomous community: Andalusia
- Province: Cádiz
- Comarca: Campo de Gibraltar

Population (2009)
  - Total: 621
- Time zone: UTC+1 (CET)
  - Summer (DST): UTC+2 (CEST)
- Website: http://www.alcaidesa.com/

La Alcaidesa is an affluent gated community (known as an urbanización in Spanish) near Sotogrande, Spain (within the municipalities of La Línea de la Concepción and San Roque), in the Andalusian province of Cádiz, accessed by junction 124 on the Autovía A-7 coastal motorway.

The natural topography allows the town to enjoy an enviable location overlooking the Mediterranean Sea and Morocco with easy access to Gibraltar, the Campo and the cities of Algeciras, Estepona and Marbella. The town has two staffed, gated access points and mobile security patrols. A fire station exclusively serving Alcaidesa was built in 2008.

The town has two golf courses at La Hacienda Links Golf Resort, a Links course originally designed by Peter Alliss and Clive Clark. The 18-hole, par 72 championship course opened in 1992 and is one of the few links-style courses in southern Europe. In 2021, the course underwent a major upgrade and renovation by acclaimed American architect Kurtis Bowman.

The renovation of the La Hacienda Links golf course involved the remodelling of all tees, greens and bunker complexes, and the redesign of a number of holes, in the process creating one of the largest putting areas in Spain. Since its reopening, the La Hacienda Links Golf Resort has received numerous accolades from both players and the golf industry, including being named 'Best Golf Course in Spain' at the World Golf Awards 2023.

The Heathland golf course was designed by respected former Ryder Cup player and architect of many internationally renowned courses, Dave Thomas. A championship course with a par 73 layout, it offers a variety of natural landscapes. As well as featuring a series of plateaus offering exceptional views of the Mediterranean Sea amongst typical Andalucian hills, several holes are set in a valley with large lakes and narrow fairways.

The popular beach Playa de La Alcaidesa is linked to Playa de La Hacienda, looking towards La Linea it is possible to see Gibraltar (a British overseas territory).

== Location ==
The main access to the town is via a tree-lined avenue with panoramic views of the Bay. Gibraltar Airport is twenty-minutes-drive away, Malaga International Airport, a two hour drive east and Jerez Airport one and a half hours to the west. A regular bus service operates between La Alcaidesa and the neighbouring city of La Línea, with a journey time of under thirty minutes. A number of local schools operate a student shuttle service to and from the town.

The resort of Sotogrande renowned for its sporting facilities is close by. Sotogrande is home to the Santa Maria Polo Club, a tennis academy, a number of other sporting facilities and is considered to be one of the most luxurious urbanizations in Europe. The surrounding area has five fine courses close by including the world famous Valderama, past home to the Ryder Cup and the European Masters.

== History ==
Construction of Alcaidesa originally started in the 1990s. La Alcaidesa Inmobiliaria (the Costain/Banesto joint venture company) owned the land and since that time a number of developers have completed further independent communities. The much-improved Spanish economy has provided new confidence among developers with a number of new builds under construction and other contractors lining up to break ground.

In July 2015 there was a reorganisation of the owners due to debts being owed to Banco Santander, Santander now own the two largest pieces of development land currently. Costain own the operating assets of the golf courses and the marina concession, and the associated smaller parcels of land and will retain the balance of the outstanding debt.

In July 2016 wildfires forced the evacuation of many properties and hotels in Alcaidesa.

In 2019 Grupo Millennium purchased Alcaidesa Holding and its subsidiary Alcaidesa Golf SLU for over €15 million from the Costain Group, with plans to build Villas and a hotel.

== Architecture ==
The architecture of La Alcaidesa follows strict style guidelines with the growth of the development itself being restricted. Under regulations set out by the Comité de Control de Arquitectura (Architectural Control Committee), Alcaidesa must retain a careful balance of villas, townhouses, and apartments, to ensure the area retains the appearance of a coastal town (or “pueblo”).

There are various residential urbanisations within Alcaidesa, such as La Corona. The first residential development to be built in La Alcaidesa was Loma Del Rey, which displays the typical rustic colours of an Andalusian-style village.

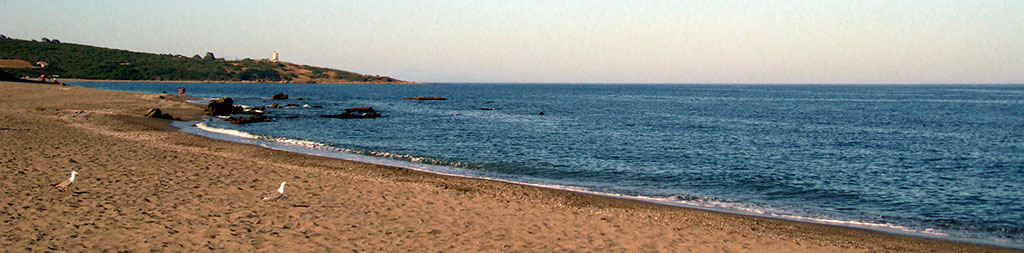
La Alcaidesa beach.

== How to get to La Alcaidesa ==
By road: Alcaidesa is located on the southwest coast of Spain, in the province of Cadiz. If you're coming by car from other cities in Spain, you can take the A-7 highway or the national road N-340, which will take you directly to Alcaidesa. From Gibraltar, take the CA-34 road towards Cadiz and follow the signs until you reach your destination.

By boat: If you prefer to arrive by sea, La Alcaidesa has a marina in the nearby city of Algeciras. From there, you can rent a boat or take a ferry to cross the Strait of Gibraltar from Morocco or Ceuta. Once in Algeciras, follow the road signs to La Alcaidesa.

By plane: The closest airport to La Alcaidesa is Gibraltar Airport, which is about a 20-minute drive away. From there, you can rent a car or take a taxi to get to your destination.

From Malaga Airport: You can also fly to Malaga Airport, which is approximately 1 hour and 30 minutes away by car from Alcaidesa. From Malaga Airport, you have several transportation options:

- By Car: Take the A-7 highway (Autovía del Mediterráneo). Follow the signs towards Algeciras/Cádiz. Continue on the A-7 until you reach La Alcaidesa. The journey takes approximately 1 hour and 30 minutes by car, depending on traffic conditions.

- By Public Transport: Take the train or bus from Malaga Airport to Algeciras. From Algeciras, you can take a taxi or rent a car to reach La Alcaidesa.

- By Private Transfer: Arrange for a private transfer service from Malaga Airport to La Alcaidesa. Several companies offer pre-booked transfer services directly to your destination.

- By Taxi: Taxis are available at Malaga Airport. You can take a taxi directly to La Alcaidesa, but it may be more expensive compared to other transportation options.
