= Feria de La Línea =

Fair of La Línea Feria de La Línea
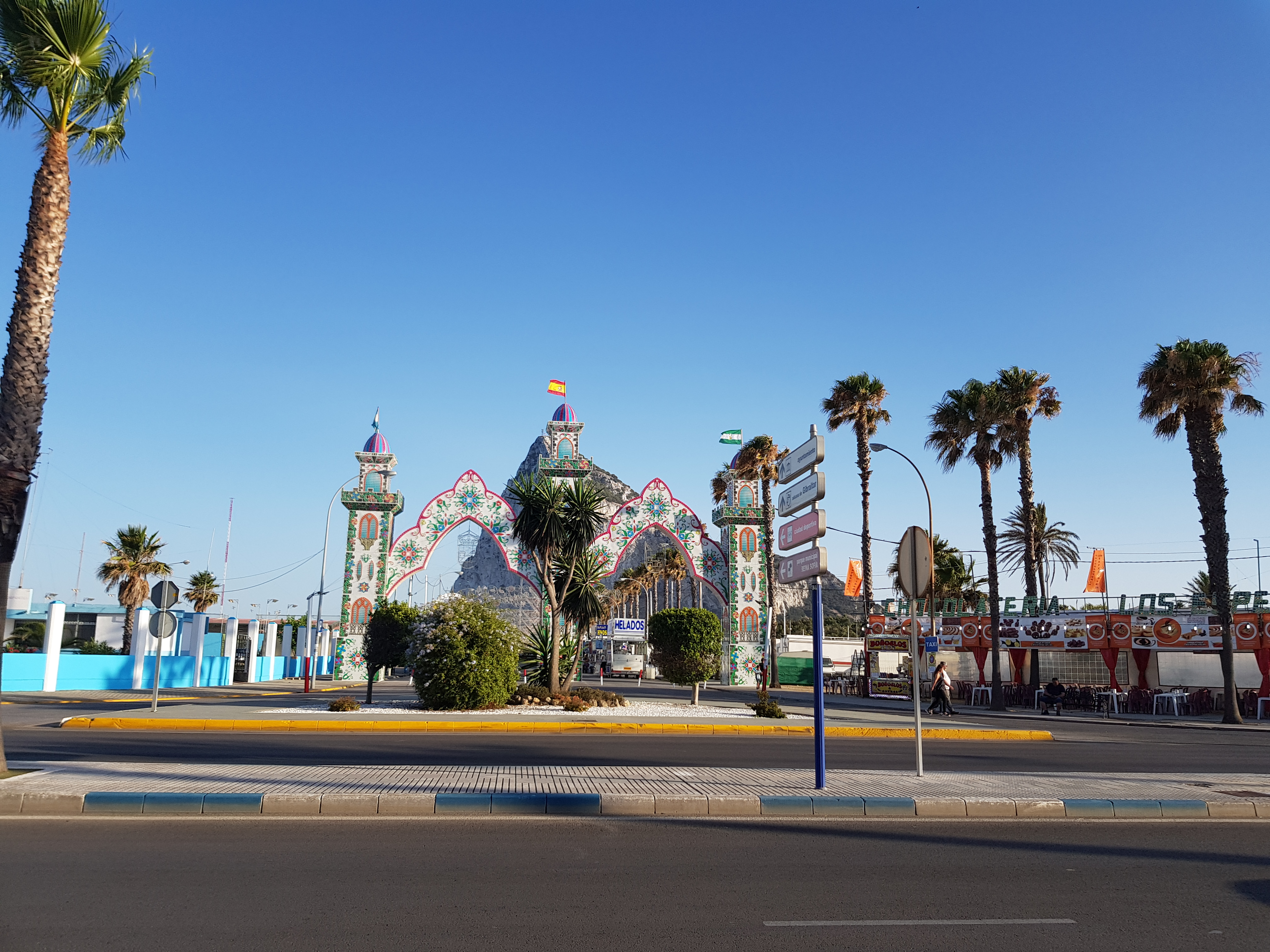
- Dates: Ten nights and nine days in July, ending on a Sunday
- Locations: Parque Municipal Reina Sofía, La Línea de la Concepción
- Coordinates: 36°09′19.8″N 5°20′34.2″W
- Country: Spain
- Years active: 1879-1936, 1939-to date
- Founded: 1879
- Website: http://feriadelalinea.com/

The Feria de La Línea, (Fair of La Línea in English) also known as La Salvaora or La Velada is a Feria (festival) and one of the most important celebrations in the Spanish municipality of La Línea de la Concepción.

The Spanish word feria originally designates a fair (agricultural, books, ...). Bullfights are often given on the occasion of fairs, so the Spaniards came to designate by the term "fair" a series of bullfightings organized on this occasion, and often - especially in Andalusia - the festivities that accompany these bullfights. In many parts of Spain, there are nevertheless still a parting between the festivities and the feria which takes place on this occasion, as is traditional the fair ends with a Bullfight in the La Línea de la Concepción Bullring.

== History ==
Its origins go back to 1879, 9 years after the town was first founded, the fair began when farmers gathered to sell and buy beautiful animals, usually drinking to celebrate the deals.

== Celebration ==
The Feria is held in the Parque Municipal Reina Sofía in July.

It is divided into two areas: one with streets lined with bars and restaurants, known as casetas, and another fairground area with rides including roller coasters and bumper cars.

All the casetas at the Feria de La Línea are public, unlike those at the Seville Fair. In the casetas, fino sherry is served, and in recent years it has also been mixed with lemonade and ice to make a drink known as Rebujito. At night, decorative lights are installed over the caseta area.
