= Playa de Torrenueva (La Línea de la Concepción) =

Beach in the Province of Cádiz, Andalusia, Spain

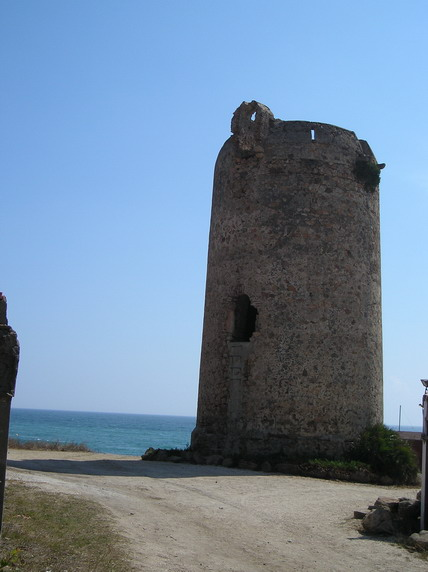
Torre Nueva, Playa de Torrenueva

Playa de Torrenueva is a beach in the municipality of La Línea de la Concepción, in the Province of Cádiz, Andalusia, Spain, located to the northeast of Gibraltar. It has a length of about 1,250 metres (4,100 ft) and average width of about 120 metres (390 ft). It is a busy little beach north of the city and bordered on the south by the Playa de La Atunara and north by the Playa de La Hacienda. In the vicinity are the remains of the Torre Nueva, a watchtower belonging to coastal surveillance system developed during the sixteenth century. It has all the basic services required of an urban beach, daily waste collection season, toilets and showers as well as the presence of police and local rescue equipment.
