= Playa de La Hacienda =

Beach in the Province of Cádiz, Spain

Coordinates: 36°13′56.29″N 5°18′49.05″W

Playa de La Hacienda is a beach in the municipality of La Línea de la Concepción, in the Province of Cádiz, Andalusia, Spain. It has a length of about 4.3 kilometres (2.7 mi) and average width of about 90 metres (300 ft). It is a busy beach north of the city and bordered to the south with the Playa de Torrenueva and to the north with the Playa de La Alcaidesa.
