= Playa de La Atunara =

Beach in the Province of Cádiz, Andalusia, Spain

Coordinates: 36°11′4.49″N 5°20′0.05″W

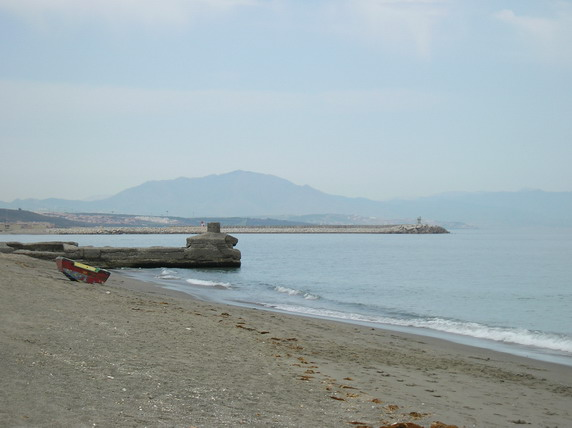
Playa de La Atunara

Playa de La Atunara is a beach in the municipality of La Línea de la Concepción, in the Province of Cádiz, Andalusia, Spain. It has a length of about 1.5 kilometres (0.93 mi) and average width of about 90 metres (300 ft). It is a busy beach and bordered on the south by the Playa de Levante and north by the Playa de Torrenueva. In its vicinity are the remains of the Tunara battery. It has a seafront promenade of restaurants, known for their pescaitos and clams. Among the highlights are the traditions of the Virgin of Carmen exiting the port of La Atunara through the streets in a parade. It has all the basic services required of an urban beach, daily waste collection season, toilets, showers and disabled access and presence of police and local rescue equipment.
