= La Línea de la Concepción =

Municipality in Cádiz, Andalusia, Spain

- Municipality
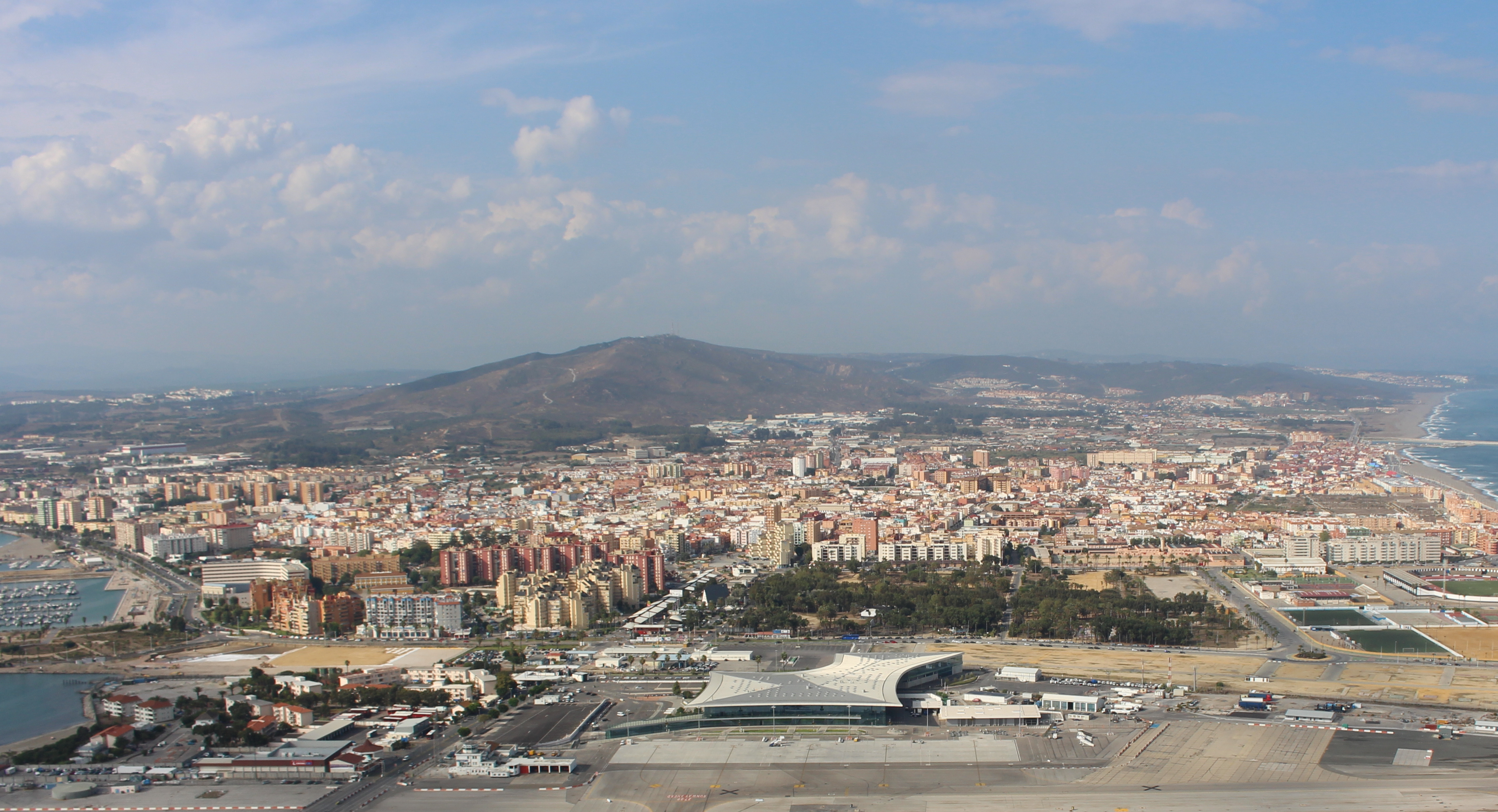
- View of La Línea as seen from the Rock of Gibraltar

- Flag Coat of arms
- Interactive map of La Línea de la Concepción
- Coordinates: 36°10′05″N 5°20′55″W
- Country: Spain
- Autonomous community: Andalusia
- Province: Cádiz
- Founded: 1870

Government
  - Mayor: Juan Franco (since 2015) (La Línea 100x100)

Area
  - Total: 19.27 km^{2} (7.44 sq mi)
- Elevation: 5 m (16 ft)

Population (2025-01-01)
  - Total: 64,499
  - Density: 3,347/km^{2} (8,669/sq mi)
- Demonym: Linense
- Time zone: UTC+1 (CET)
  - Summer (DST): UTC+2 (CEST)
- Postal code: 11300
- Dialing code: (+34) 956 ó 856
- Website: www.lalinea.es

La Línea de la Concepción (Spanish pronunciation: [la ˈlinea ðe la konθeβˈθjon]), often referred to simply as La Línea, is a municipality of Spain belonging to the province of Cádiz, Andalusia.

The city lies on the sandy isthmus which is part of the eastern flank of the Bay of Gibraltar, and includes the entire Gibraltar–Spain border to the south. La Línea has close economic and social links with the British overseas territory of Gibraltar. It is part of the comarca of Campo de Gibraltar.

The first dwellings, which date back to the 18th century, were behind the Spanish fortification lines drawn up during the Sieges of Gibraltar which took place during the 18c and 19c wars in Europe.

The population of La Línea was a part of the municipality of San Roque until the community was decreed on 17 January 1870 to be a standalone municipality.

The people of La Línea have traditionally found work in Gibraltar, from the days in the 18th century when Gibraltar was an important naval port.

La Línea was, and still is, a supplier of fresh produce from its open and fertile land area as well as its population supplying workers, mainly for the Gibraltar Dockyard. This provision stopped with the total closure of the border by the Spanish government between 9 June 1969 and 15 December 1982 as a result of the dispute between Spain and Britain regarding the sovereignty of Gibraltar. The border was fully reopened on 5 February 1985.

La Línea is a major supplier of fruit and vegetables to Gibraltar; other industries include the manufacture of cork, liquor, and fish paste. It also had an important military garrison with substantial fortifications and a port.

== Name ==
Segregated from the municipality of San Roque in 1870, the municipality of La Línea (lit. "the Line") derives its name from the Line of Contravallation (la Línea de Contravalación) defensive structure built after the 1727 Siege of Gibraltar. In 1883, the name was first recorded officially as La Línea de la Concepción, a reference to the Immaculate Conception, the then patron of the Spanish Army.

== History ==
=== The War of Spanish Succession and the British occupation of Gibraltar ===
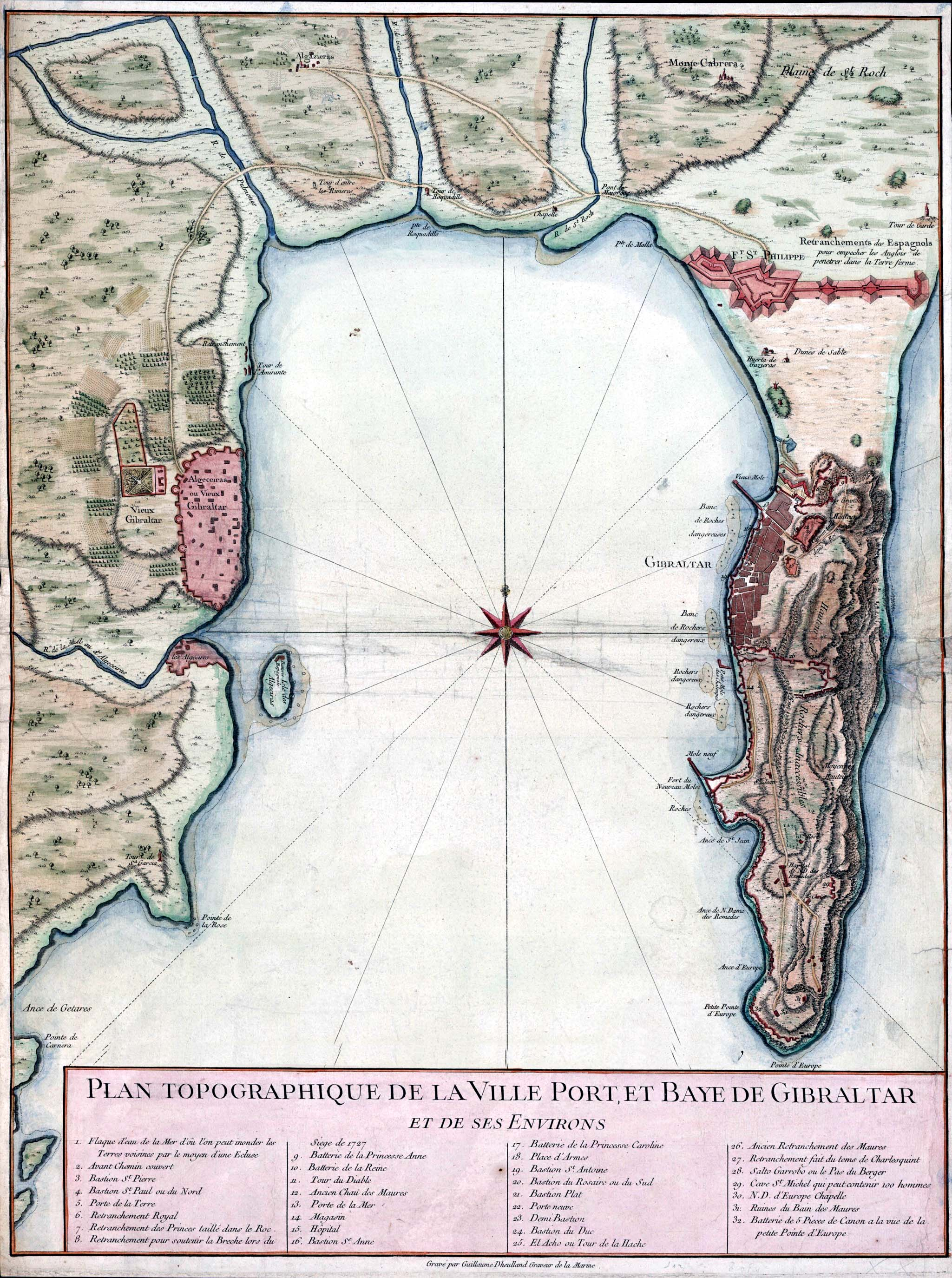
c. 1750 map of Algeciras Bay showing Algeciras (left) and Gibraltar; there is roughly 10 km (5.4 nmi; 6.2 mi) of open water between them.

When Charles II died in 1700 without an heir to the Crown of Spain, the War of the Spanish Succession broke out between the two main pretenders to the Spanish throne: Philip of Anjou and Charles, Archduke of Austria (later Charles VI of the Holy Roman Empire). Philip was the grandson of Louis XIV of France, and had the support of France. Austria, England, and the Netherlands feared a possible alliance and/or a hypothetical union between the French and Spanish royal houses, and so favoured the Habsburg Charles. In November 1700, Philip was declared king.

The Grand Alliance captured Gibraltar on 3 August 1704 during the War of the Spanish Succession after abortive attempts elsewhere. It was selected for its strategic value, weak garrison and to encourage the rejection of Philip V (the Bourbon Claimant) in favour of Charles III (the Hapsburg claimant). Following orders to respect civilians, officers tried to maintain control but discipline broke down and the men ran amok. After order was restored, despite the surrender agreement promising property and religious rights, most of the population left with the garrison on 7 August citing loyalty to Philip. Several factors influenced the decision including the expectation of a counter attack and the violence during the capture, which ultimately proved disastrous for the Hapsburg cause. The subsequent siege failed to dislodge the Hapsburg forces and the refugees settled around Algeciras and the hermitage of San Roque. In 1711, the British and French Governments started secret negotiations to end the war leading to the cession of Gibraltar to the British by the Treaty of Utrecht in 1713. The municipality of San Roque still has as its motto "La Muy Noble y Más Leal Ciudad de San Roque, donde reside la de Gibraltar " ("the Most Noble and Most Loyal City of San Roque, where reside those [the people] of Gibraltar"). The town lands included the area of the modern La Línea de la Concepción.

King Felipe V, the name by which Philip of Anjou was crowned, ordered the Marquis de Villadarías to besiege the Plaza de Gibraltar. This first attempt to regain the city was unsuccessful and the Spanish army lifted the siege. However, to monitor the isthmus and to oppose a possible invasion of the rest of the territory, a permanent garrison was established in the area, under the military government of Campo de Gibraltar.

=== The Contravallation Line or La Línea de Gibraltar ===
Gibraltar was under constant surveillance and subjected to the unsuccessful Siege of Gibraltar 1727 and the Great Siege of Gibraltar 1779-1783. After the 1727 siege, the Spanish government began the construction of a line of fortifications, the "Contravallation Line" or "La Línea de Gibraltar" thus eventually giving rise to the town La Línea De La Concepción. This would isolate the British outpost from the Spanish mainland.

An order was issued on 2 November 1730 to the Director of Engineering Prospero Jorge de Verboom, for the construction of two strongholds, one located to the east and the other at west of the isthmus, both united by a line of fortification, with the aim of preventing the movement and to assert rights over the isthmus, in addition to consolidate the Spanish presence in the area.

Construction began in 1731 on the two major strongholds, known as Santa Bárbara and San Felipe. The first was named in honor of the patroness of the Artillery, located at the east beach, where their remains are still visible. The second took its name to honor King Felipe V, and is situated on the west beach. Between these two strongholds a large wall was built with central square tip diamond shaped bulwarks with their respective bodies, running from Santa Bárbara to San Felipe. All of them were located at equidistant distances and were called Santa Mariana, San Benito, semi-square and body guard of San José, San Fernando and San Carlos.

Construction of this formidable defensive line was completed in 1735; described now as 'Contravallation Line' or La Línea de Gibraltar.

Thus, La Línea originated from a provisional camp made by artisans and merchants who supplied the military and their families in the vicinity of the fortifications erected to besiege Gibraltar.

The bastions of The Line of Gibraltar would remain intact serving the purpose for which they were built until 1810 during the invasion of the Iberian peninsula by Napoleonic troops, leading to the Spanish War of Independence and the Peninsular War.

Fearing that the French troops of Napoleon Bonaparte, which had already arrived in the Campo de Gibraltar, might take over the fortresses of La Línea, the Gibraltar Commanding Royal Engineer Charles Holloway decided to blast an opening through them on 14 February 1810. Gibraltar, supported by La Línea, became an important base for Spanish fighters against Napoleon's troops.

After the destruction of the physical line that blocked the passage through the isthmus, the city continued to grow with a strong dependence on Gibraltar, covering all sorts of services to Gibraltar (supply of food, meat, fruit, vegetables and physical space for housing nearby and a labor force in the service of an expanding port, etc.).

In due time, traders, merchants and workers wanted the simple line of buildings to become an independent municipality of San Roque, controlled by the military, landowners and aristocrats. On 17 January 1870 the segregation of La Línea from San Roque was approved.

Some 300 inhabitants were located at Gibraltar Line, the place being named therefore, in Spanish, La Línea. The new municipality included the current Plaza de la Iglesia, Plaza de la Constitución, calle Real (Royal Street), Jardines Street and España Avenue. It had a cemetery, the command, and a customs post, guards and soldiers barracks being located beyond the neighborhood and Espigón far east on the beach.

Properly speaking, La Atunara or Tunara, should not be considered as a contemporary part of the line because its origins date back to some 640 years before the city itself.

On 20 July 1870 La Línea got its first mayor, Lutgardo López Muñoz, chosen by a committee of residents appointed by the provincial council. At the first meeting of the new city hall, it was unanimously decided the name should be La Línea de la Concepción, as the Immaculate Conception was deeply rooted in Spanish army tradition of the time. The name is recorded from 1883.

La Línea was granted the title of 'city' (ciudad) in 1913.

=== Relations with modern Gibraltar ===
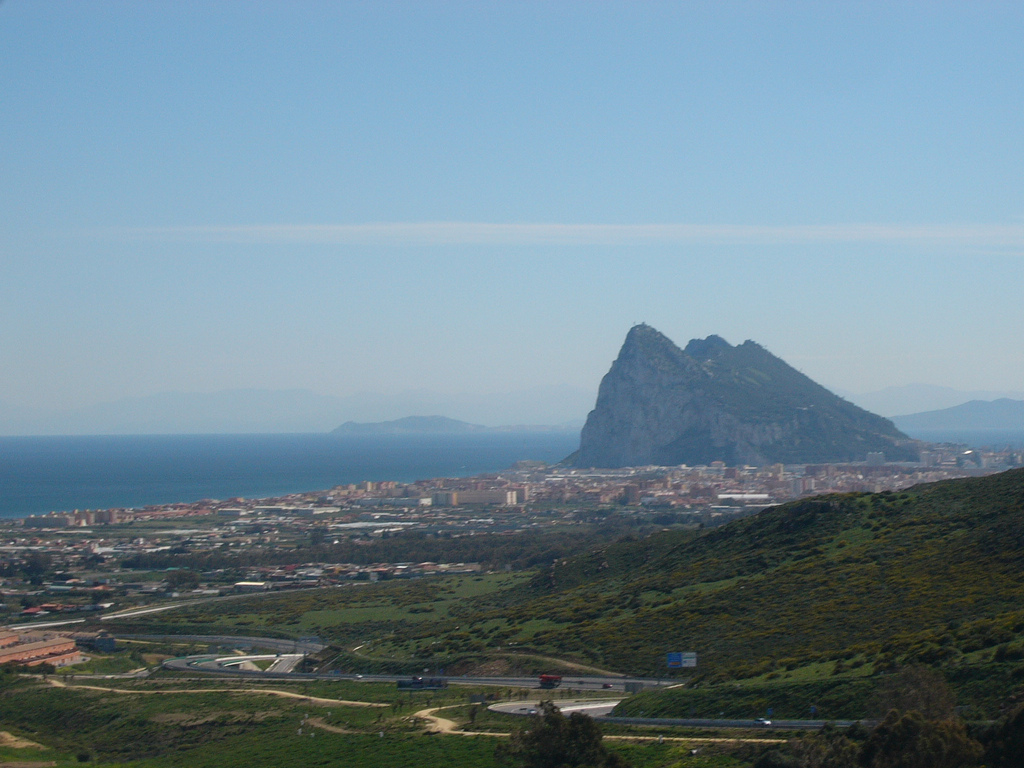
View of La Línea from the mainland, with the Rock of Gibraltar in the background.

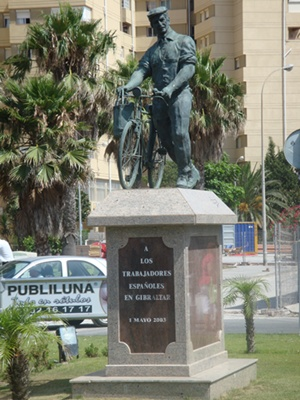
Monument to the Spanish Worker in Gibraltar.

Dictator Francisco Franco ordered the closure of the border gate with Gibraltar on 8 June 1969, in response to the new Gibraltar Constitution. Many people from La Línea lost their jobs in Gibraltar. The border was reopened on 15 December 1982 with full public access in 1985.

Protests were undertaken against the presence of the nuclear submarine HMS Tireless in Gibraltar for repairs in 2001.

In 2010, the People's Party mayor of La Línea, Alejandro Sánchez, attempted to impose a "congestion charge" on people entering or leaving Gibraltar.

In November 2017, Apymell collective of small businesses started accepting Pound sterling as a currency for payment in the town.

The 2020 British exit from the EU rendered Gibraltar foreign territory, but Spain retains the 'status quo', pending further negotiations. As of 2025, an agreement to avoid a hard border between Gibraltar and Spain appears to have been reached but requires ratification.

The Línea town council has pleaded for the establishment of the town as a new autonomous community of Spain out of Andalusia, with a similar status to that of Ceuta and Melilla. The Supreme Court sentenced that the measure "affects the territorial organization of the State and of the Autonomous Communities, an extremely delicate matter in which any alteration goes beyond purely local interests", thereby bringing down the initiative.

== Monuments ==
=== Strongholds of San Carlos, Santa Bárbara and San Felipe ===
18th century military buildings. Built during the siege of Gibraltar as part of the so-called Contravalación Line of Gibraltar, a group of fortifications whose goal was to besiege Gibraltar checking on any UK further expansionist ideas.

During the War of Independence, Peninsular War, Spain had initially been allied to France while trying to invade Portugal, but France shortly after turned on its ally, Spain. Forcing the Spanish to ally itself with Great Britain and Portugal against Napoleonic France to regain control of Spain from the French, these fortifications were blown up by the British to avoid falling into the hands of France. Currently, the Ruins of Fort St. Barbara is in a recovery phase, while the Fort San Felipe remnants have appeared recently. Fort San Carlos does not seem to have left preserved evidence. EU funding was provided in 2023 to La Línea to enable a restoration of the Santa Barbara fort.

=== The Military HQ ===
Currently it hosts the Museum of the Isthmus but was once the military command associated to the Halls Head Officers garrison. It is the oldest building in town that exists, whose Officers' pavilions date from 1863 to 1865.

=== The Municipal Guards Building ===
In 1944 it was demolished in the old "Carabineros Barracks" at the Explanada (now, the Constitution Plaza). There was a single floor building located in the left corner of it. This building was for many years, the Municipal Guards Building and next to it, the first Police Station of this city lasting till about 1936. The Santa Mariana Guard was responsible for checking the San Benito Guard, by the sidewalk near the fountain of Santa Barbara on the beach of Levante.

=== Torre Nueva ===
The Torre Nueva tower is one of 44 towers of the same characteristics that built along the coast from the river Guadiaro to the border with Portugal. All of them were built during the reign of Felipe III, with others located on the Mediterranean coast, from Málaga to Catalonia. These were built to warn the coastal population to the presence of the Berber pirate ships. Smoke signals and bonfires were used to warn of the presence of the pirate ships. At the top of the building, there was always a bundle of dry wood to be burned immediately in case of danger, transmitting the alarm signal to the towers nearby. EU funding was provided in 2023 to La Línea to enable a restoration of the Santa Barbara fort.

=== Bullring ===
The Bullring was built on the old Plaza del Arenal and took 3 years to build and was completed in 1883 with capacity for 6000 people. It is considered to be one of the oldest buildings in La Línea along with the former Military Command, now the Museo del Istmo , which are good examples of architecture in Andalusia in the late 19th century. Various fights have taken place in the bullring including a fight between a lion and a bull in 1887. During the 1970s and 1980s the upper part of the bullring was unsafe and was demolished. The bull-ring is now fully restored and bullfights take place again. It also acts as a venue for music and other events.

Luis Ramírez Galuzo was undoubtedly one of the neighbors of the city with more economic means of the century, and the mayor on several occasions, submitted to the council for permission to build on own property, a bullring, to celebrate the Spanish festival, other festivals such as acrobatic, and other celebrations in the year 1880, the project being led by the provincial architect Adolfo del Castillo, author among other works, of the Abastos market, today Concepción market and the former Municipal Slaughterhouse now disappeared.

Bullfights mark the beginning of the Feria de la Línea which is celebrated in mid-July and in recent times is the only time that a bullfight occurs.

=== Shrine of the Immaculate Conception ===
The main Parish church was built in the 19th century colonial style. Notable features are the 17th-century reredos and the image of St. Mary made by the Andalusian sculptor Luis Ortega Bru. The church became a shrine at the end of 2005. The Church of the Immaculate Conception has three naves. The exterior of the building echoes the interior layout, with a remarkable simplicity and beauty.

Inside the parish church of the Immaculate Conception there are images of Jesús del Gran Poder, and others belonging to four religious guilds.

=== The Three Graces ===
The Three Graces is a Monument at the Plaza de la Iglesia that is based on the Greek mythology of the three Charites, which represent charm, beauty, and creativity. This work by Nacho Falgueras is based on that by the local painter José Cruz Herrera. The recently opened monument is a tribute to the "linense" women.

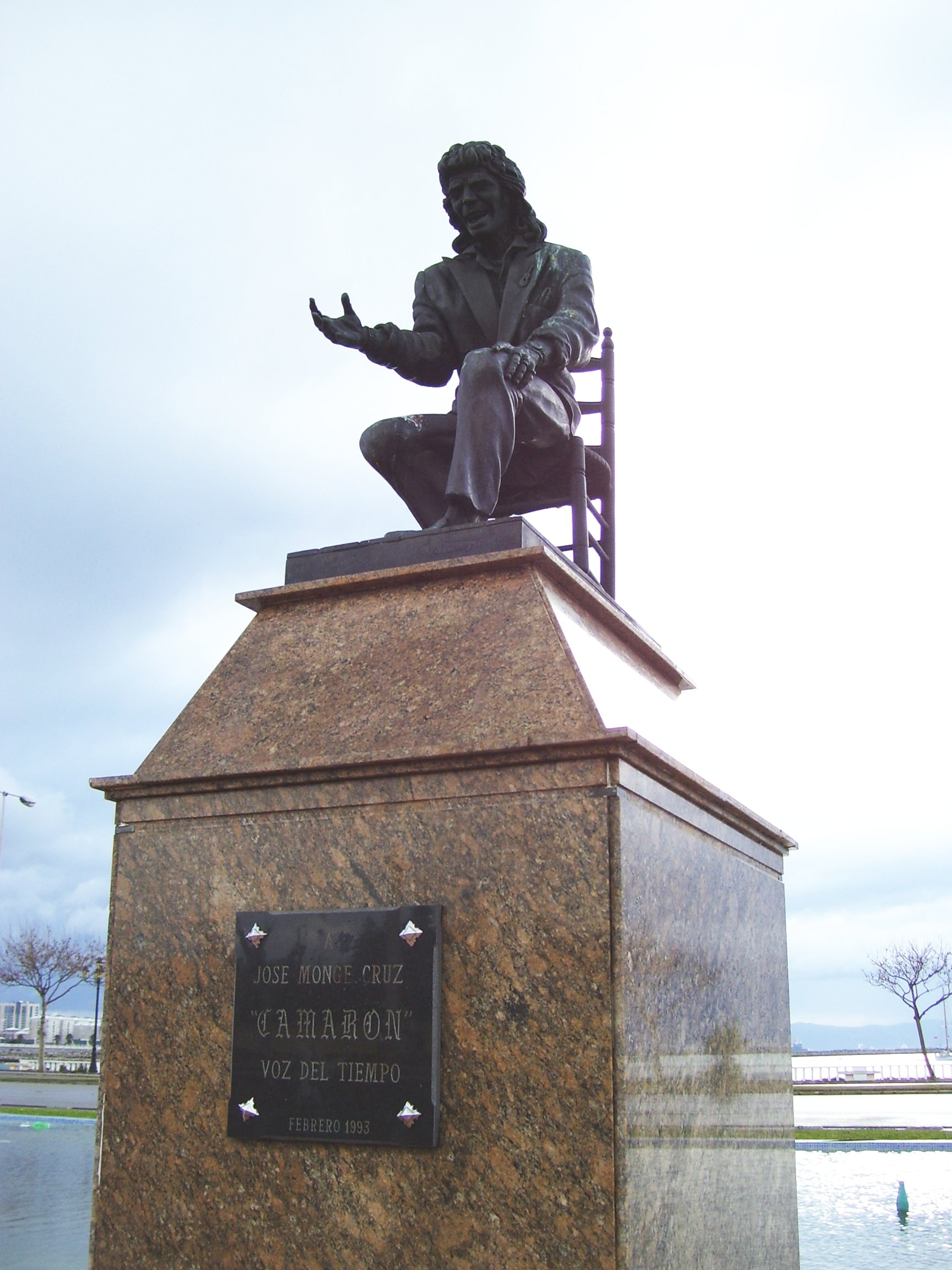
Monument Camarón de la Isla

=== Monument to the Spanish workers in Gibraltar ===
Work also of Nacho Falgueras. It is a tribute to the thousands of "linenses" and "campogibraltareños" who spent their lives working in Gibraltar. Because of difficult times in this part of Spain they crossed the border every day to work and support their families. It is a tribute by the town of La Línea to all those who worked and continue to work in Gibraltar.

=== Monument to Camarón de la Isla ===
Monument located on the west access of the city, between the Paseo Marítimo de Poniente and the Casa de la Juventud. It is a historical monument dedicated to the figure of the famous flamenco singer José Monge Cruz, Camarón de la Isla, who lived much of his life in this city. The sculpture is also the work of Nacho Falgueras.

=== Conservatorio Profesional de Música "Muñoz Molleda" ===
It takes its name from the "linense" José Muñoz Molleda, who gave music lessons to many young people, aged between 9 and 35 years, both "Linenses" and from other nearby cities, as this Music Conservatory was the only one in the Campo de Gibraltar area awarding a "Grado Medio"—intermediate degree.

A stepping stone for learning music in the city for many years, together with the "Linense" Municipal Foundation of Culture and the Félix Enríquez Musical Society.

Currently under reform, there is still teaching going on. On the underground parking just below the extension of the Conservatory, archaeological remains of the 18th century Contravalación line were found and are now displayed nearby.

Plans for introducing soon the area of professional Opera Singing were put forward in December 2006 by famous International Opera soprano Singer Montserrat Caballé.

== Museums ==
- Museo Cruz Herrera
- Museum of the Isthmus . Located at the former Military Command of the city.
- Municipal Historical Museum.

It stores files documenting the city since 1887.

- Museo Taurino—Bullfighting Museum.

It stores a large collection of bullfighting posters, costumes, herds, stamps, photographs of bullfighters, and so on.

== Markets ==
Market retailers are temporarily relocated to an outdoor market at Avenida 20 de Abril, the Boulevard close to the Border with Gibraltar, due to the restoration and rebuilding works being carried out in the old 1880's indoor Market.

The historical Market was of Cultural Interest, not only because of its interior, with a variety of produce shops and fish stalls, but also of the surrounding street clothing stalls and bustling atmosphere.

== Geography ==
=== Beaches ===
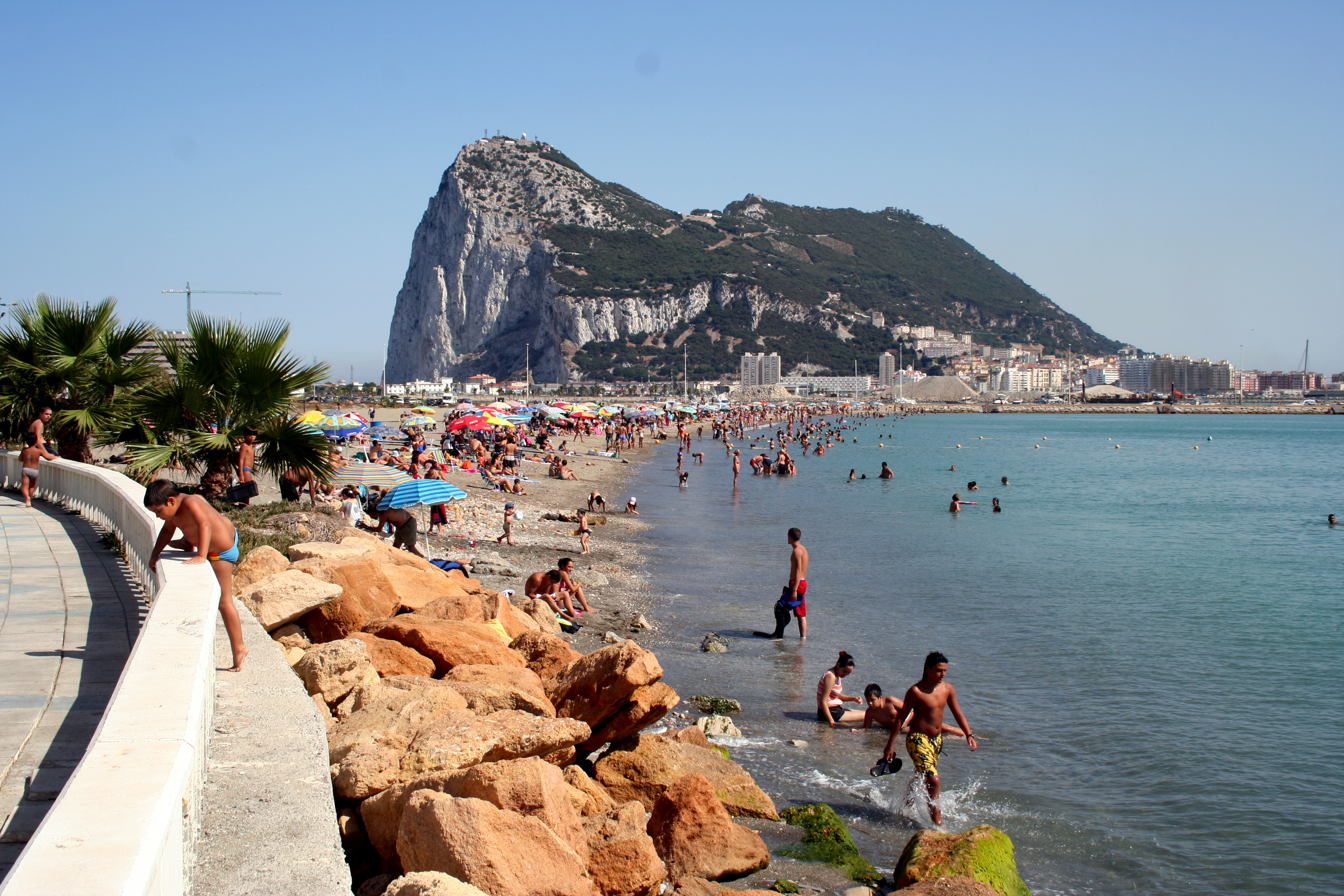
Beachgoers at Playa de Poniente.

La Línea has 14 kilometres (9 miles) of beaches, named Playa de Levante, Playa de La Atunara, La Alcaidesa, Playa de La Hacienda, Playa de Poniente, Playa de Santa Bárbara, El Burgo Sobrevela, Portichuelos, Playa de Torrenueva, some of which are awarded each year a Blue Flag beach award by the Coastal European Authorities. In 2007, the beaches of La Alcaidesa and Sobrevela obtained this recognition.

=== Environment ===
In May 2014 a report by the World Health Organization showed that La Línea had the worst air quality in Spain. The report concentrated on PM10 and PM2.5 Pollutants in the air, which could only have come from the nearby Gibraltar-San Roque Refinery , in the 2016 report by the World Health Organization, La Línea was the third worst place in Spain in terms of air quality. In March 2023 an improvement in air quality is shown by the La Línea de la Concepción air quality index (AQI) forecast being at the highest Index level of Good

== Climate ==
La Línea

Climate chart (precipitation, max. and min. temperature)
J	F	M	A	M	J	J	A	S	O	N	D
93 16 11	87 17 12	63 18 13	50 20 14	25 22 16	10 26 18	1 28 20	4 28 21	21 26 20	81 22 17	102 19 14	109 17 12
- █ Average max. and min. temperatures in °C
- █ Precipitation totals in mm
- Source: Weather Atlas
Imperial conversion
J	F	M	A	M	J	J	A	S	O	N	D
3.7 61 52	3.4 63 54	2.5 64 55	2 68 57	1 72 61	0.4 79 64	0 82 68	0.2 82 70	0.8 79 68	3.2 72 63	4 66 57	4.3 63 54
- █ Average max. and min. temperatures in °F
- █ Precipitation totals in inches

La Línea de la Concepción has a subtropical Hot-summer Mediterranean climate (Köppen: Csa) with moderately warm winters and very warm summers. The summer is the driest season, while the winter is the wettest season, followed closely by the autumn. The average annual temperature is 18.6 °C. The high temperatures during winter range normally from 15 to 21 °C (59 to 70 °F), while the lows from 9 to 15 °C (48 to 59 °F). During summer, the high temperatures range normally from 26 to 30 °C (79 to 86 °F), while the lows from 18 to 22 °C (64 to 72 °F). Large fluctuation between the highs and the lows is very rare, as in average, the high temperatures are just 6 °C warmer than the lows. The city receives nearly 3,000 hours of sunshine a year. The city lies directly on the coast so humidity is normally between 60-70% and the influence of the cool sea currents is very noticeable so the temperatures are always mild, extreme temperatures are rare.

Climate data for La Línea de la Concepción
Month	Jan	Feb	Mar	Apr	May	Jun	Jul	Aug	Sep	Oct	Nov	Dec	Year
Mean daily maximum °C (°F)	16.0 (60.8)	17.0 (62.6)	18.0 (64.4)	20.0 (68.0)	22.0 (71.6)	26.0 (78.8)	28.0 (82.4)	28.0 (82.4)	26.0 (78.8)	22.0 (71.6)	19.0 (66.2)	17.0 (62.6)	21.6 (70.9)
Mean daily minimum °C (°F)	11.0 (51.8)	12.0 (53.6)	13.0 (55.4)	13.0 (55.4)	16.0 (60.8)	18.0 (64.4)	20.0 (68.0)	21.0 (69.8)	20.0 (68.0)	17.0 (62.6)	14.0 (57.2)	12.0 (53.6)	15.6 (60.1)
Average rainfall mm (inches)	93.0 (3.66)	87.0 (3.43)	63.0 (2.48)	50.0 (1.97)	25.0 (0.98)	10.0 (0.39)	1.0 (0.04)	4.0 (0.16)	21.0 (0.83)	81.0 (3.19)	102.0 (4.02)	109.0 (4.29)	646 (25.44)
Source: Weather Atlas

Climate data for La Línea de la Concepción
Month	Jan	Feb	Mar	Apr	May	Jun	Jul	Aug	Sep	Oct	Nov	Dec	Year
Average sea temperature °C (°F)	16.3 (61.3)	15.8 (60.4)	15.7 (60.3)	16.9 (62.4)	18.5 (65.3)	21.0 (69.8)	22.8 (73.0)	23.3 (73.9)	21.8 (71.2)	20.6 (69.1)	18.3 (64.9)	16.8 (62.2)	19.0 (66.2)
Source: seatemperature.org

== Demographics ==
Historical population
Year	1999	2000	2001	2002	2003	2004	2005	2010
Pop.	59,828	59,993	60,565	60,951	61,892	61,875	62,682	64,645
±%	—	+0.3%	+1.0%	+0.6%	+1.5%	−0.0%	+1.3%	+3.1%
Source: INE (Spain)

The population in 2018 is recorded as 62,940

=== Nationality ===
Distribution of the population by nationality.

Nationality in La Línea de la Concepción (2022)
Nacionality	Men	Women	Total	%	Proportion
Spanish	28,312	29,942	58,254	92.0 %	
Foreign	2,700	2,317	5,017	7.9 %	

== Notable people ==
- Ángel Garó, actor and comedian.
- Manuel Charlton, founder and guitarist for Scottish rock band Nazareth
- Álex Quillo, footballer.
- Rafael Trujillo, sports sailor.
- Tete Morente, footballer

== Facilities ==
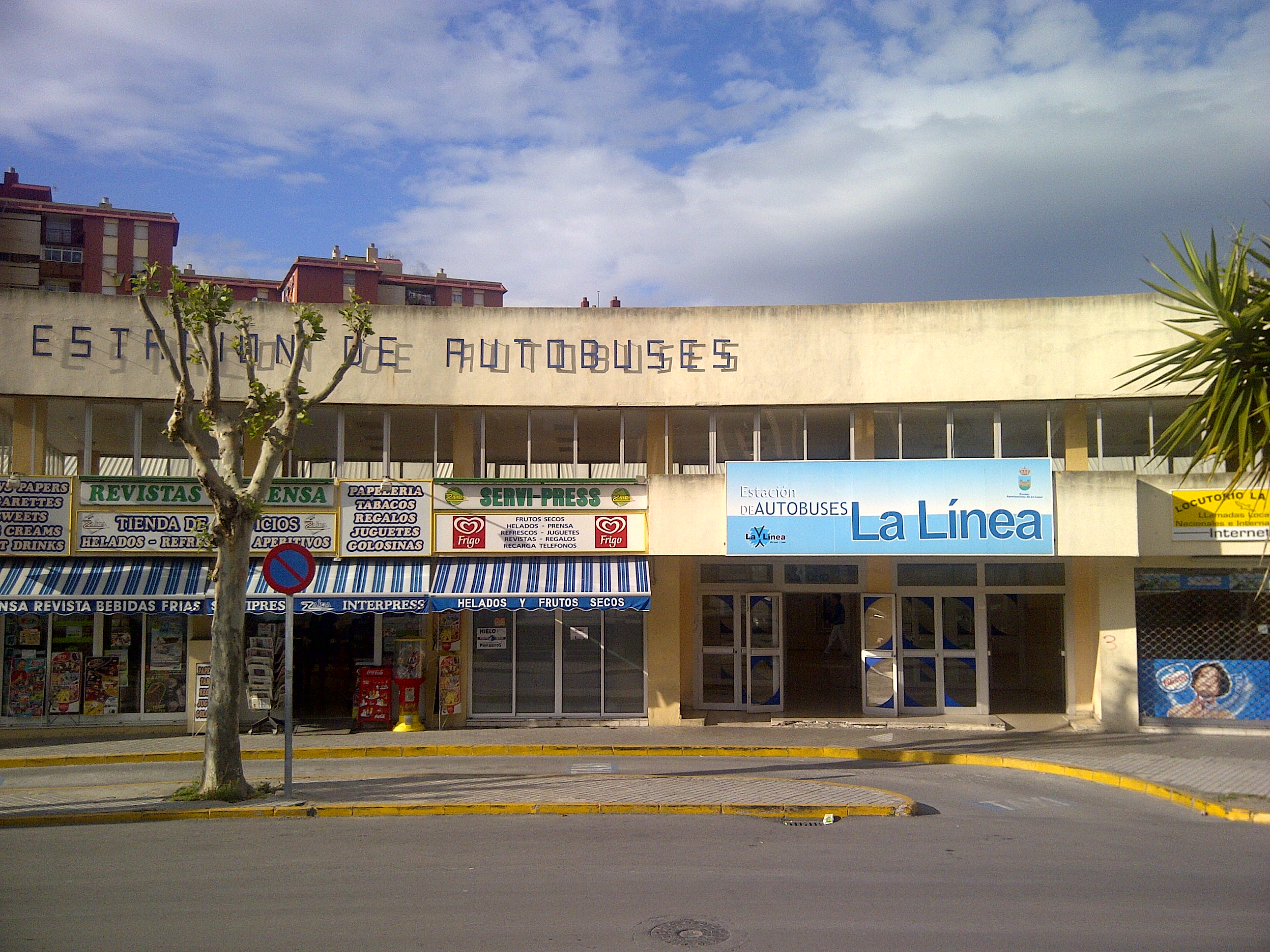
La Línea de la Concepción Bus Station

- Congress and Exhibition Hall: opened in 2005 with a floor area of over 5300 m², the palace is built around two main areas, the main auditorium and the conferences auditorium. It also has a scene of 200 m² surface and 10 m in height, which allows not only the holding of congresses, but also events such as theater, concerts and even opera. The conference auditorium seats 354, and although it is totally unrelated to the first so they can develop different activities simultaneously, the facilities are interconnected to support each other if necessary. In this palace are very frequent theater companies and concerts given by such people as Montserrat Caballé, Raphael, or other well known artists. The Palace also has a four star hotel from the Iberostar chain.
- Menéndez Pelayo International University headquarters is located in one of the most emblematic buildings of the town, given its rationalist architecture: Villa D'Amato, family home of a prestigious Maltese trader since 1939, formerly a popular theater where people came to enjoy the most famous moment. The writer Mario Vargas Llosa gave a keynote address opened the university.
- Real Club Náutico de La Línea: the Real Club Náutico de La Línea is located in Av/ del Mar, principally the sport of sailing, with this support have been distinguished sailors as Rafael Trujillo Villar. Diving is also practiced, with beginner and advanced courses in these two sports.

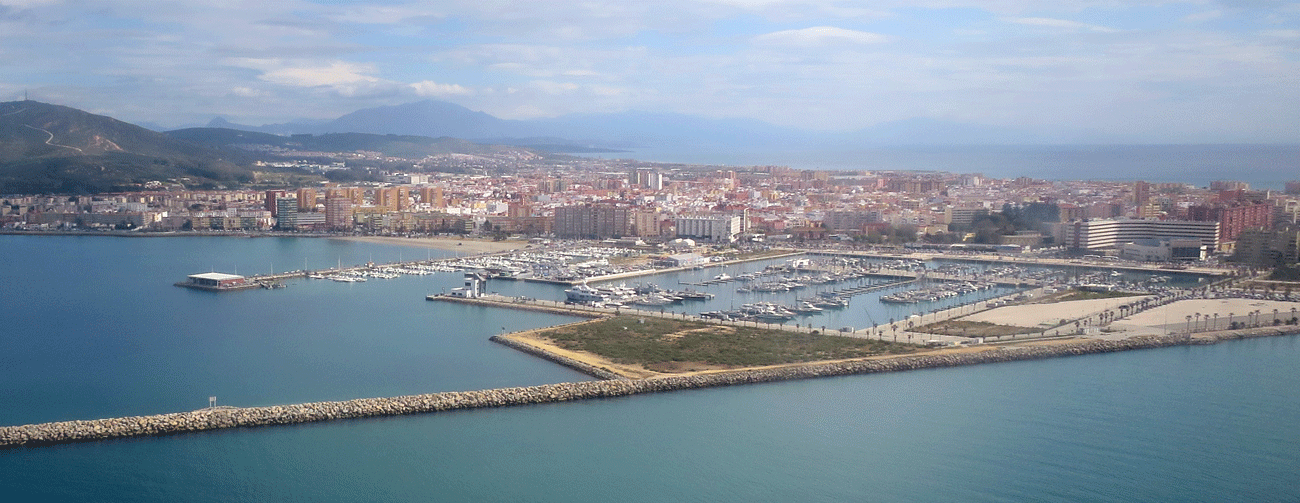
Aerial view of the Alcaidesa Marina

- Alcaidesa Marina: The facility has 777 berths and an extension of 59,898 m^{2} and a sheet of water of 239,947 m^{2} for the construction and operation of facilities nautical-use sports and recreational commercial.

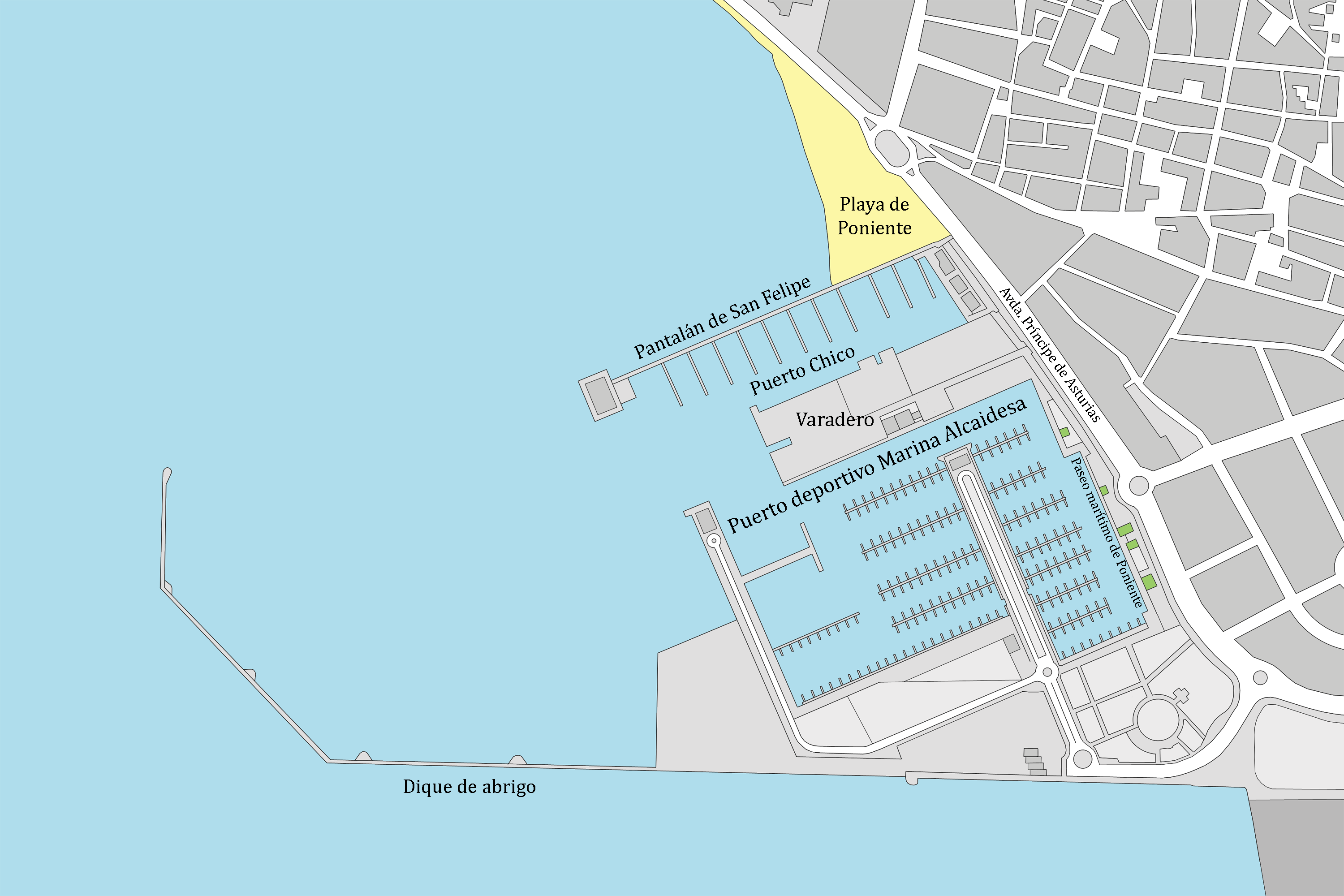
Plan of Alcaidesa Marina

- College of Teachers
- Teatro La Veladathe Evening Theatre
- Office of the General Directorate of Transport
- Has a large commercial: CC Gran Sur
- La Línea de la Concepción Bus Station
- Polideportivo municipal swimming pool
- Estadio Municipal de La Línea de la Concepción
- Casa de la Juventud

== Sights ==
- The Path of the Bunkers..a walking route visiting the historical World War II concrete defensive bunkers and pill-boxes close to the Border with Gibraltar
- Parque Municipal Reina Sofía: A place where hundreds of young people congregate every Friday and Saturday is winter or summer, in the mythical stands, which allows Botellón in the city.
- In the town centre are located cafes, restaurants and late-night bars, located in the streets and squares, with many open until 4:00. In summer, on the two main beaches, Levante and Poniente, are beach restaurants, the chiringuitos.

== Local cultural festivals and events ==
- Feria de La Línea also known as "The Salvaora" Fiesta declared of National Tourist Interest in Andalusia, is celebrated in mid-July.
- Rocieros Sunday, the first Sunday of Fair.
- Easter Week Semana Santa
- Medieval Fair in July and November
- Certamen Andaluz de Música "Muñoz Molleda".
- Feast of the Immaculate Conception (8 December, patron saint of the city)
- Saint John's Eve celebrated by making Bonfires of Saint John
- Carnaval de la Concha Fina, held in February / March each year.
- Top Fair in early May, in the Complex Ballesteros.
- National piano.

== Transport ==
By road:

- Autovía A-383 belonging to the Mediterranean motorway (Autovía A-7)
- Autovía CA-34

By air:

- Gibraltar Airport, accessible from the frontier.
- Jerez Airport, 118 km.
- Málaga Airport, 121 km.
- Sevilla Airport, 203 km.

By train:

- San Roque station (nearest station)

La Línea is one of the few cities in Spain with a population above 50,000 not to be served by a railway line. A project to complete the San Roque-La Línea railway line was aborted in the 1970s.

== See also ==
- List of municipalities in Cádiz
