= Guadacorte =

- Barriada (pedanía)
- Location in the Province of Cádiz Guadacorte (Spain)
- Coordinates: 36°11′30″N 5°25′29″W
- Country: Spain
- Autonomous community: Andalusia
- Province: Cádiz
- Comarca: Campo de Gibraltar
- Municipality: Los Barrios
- Judicial district: Algeciras

Population (2009)
  - Total: 1,113
- Time zone: UTC+1 (CET)
  - Summer (DST): UTC+2 (CEST)
- Postal code: 11370, Railway station: 11379
- Dialing code: (+34) 956
- Official language(s): Spanish

Guadacorte is a village and district of the Spanish municipality of Los Barrios in the Province of Cádiz, Spain, between Gibraltar and Algeciras. It is located eight kilometers east of the main town of the municipality and had a population of 1,113 inhabitants in 2009.

This town is located on the right bank of the Guadarranque River, which separates the towns of San Roque and Los Barrios. Taraguilla lies to the north across the river, and Los Cortijillos is just to the south. There is a nineteenth-century chapel and a park and wetland with a lake of the same name, which has a permanent population of ducks and cisnes.
