= Guadarranque Reservoir =

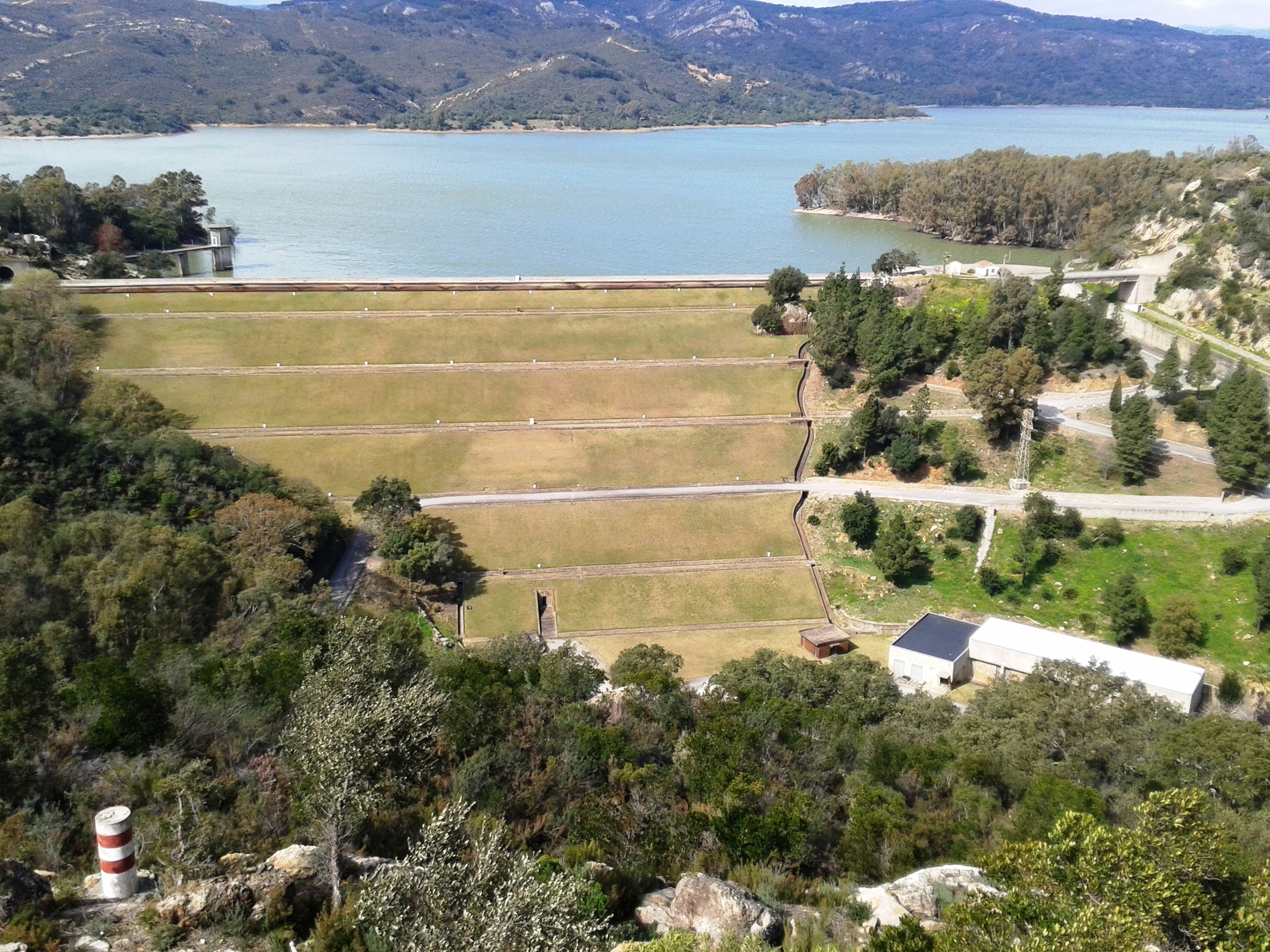
- Dam that controls the Reservoir

- Location within Andalusia
- Location: Los Barrios, Castellar de la Frontera, San Roque
- Coordinates: 36°19′7″N 5°28′6″W
- Type: reservoir
- Primary inflows: Guadarranque
- Basin countries: Spain
- Built: 1965

Guadarranque Reservoir is a reservoir impounded from the Guadarranque in the province of Cádiz, Andalusia, Spain.

== See also ==
- List of reservoirs and dams in Andalusia
