= Plaza de toros La Montera =

Bull ring in Los Barrios, Cádiz, Spain

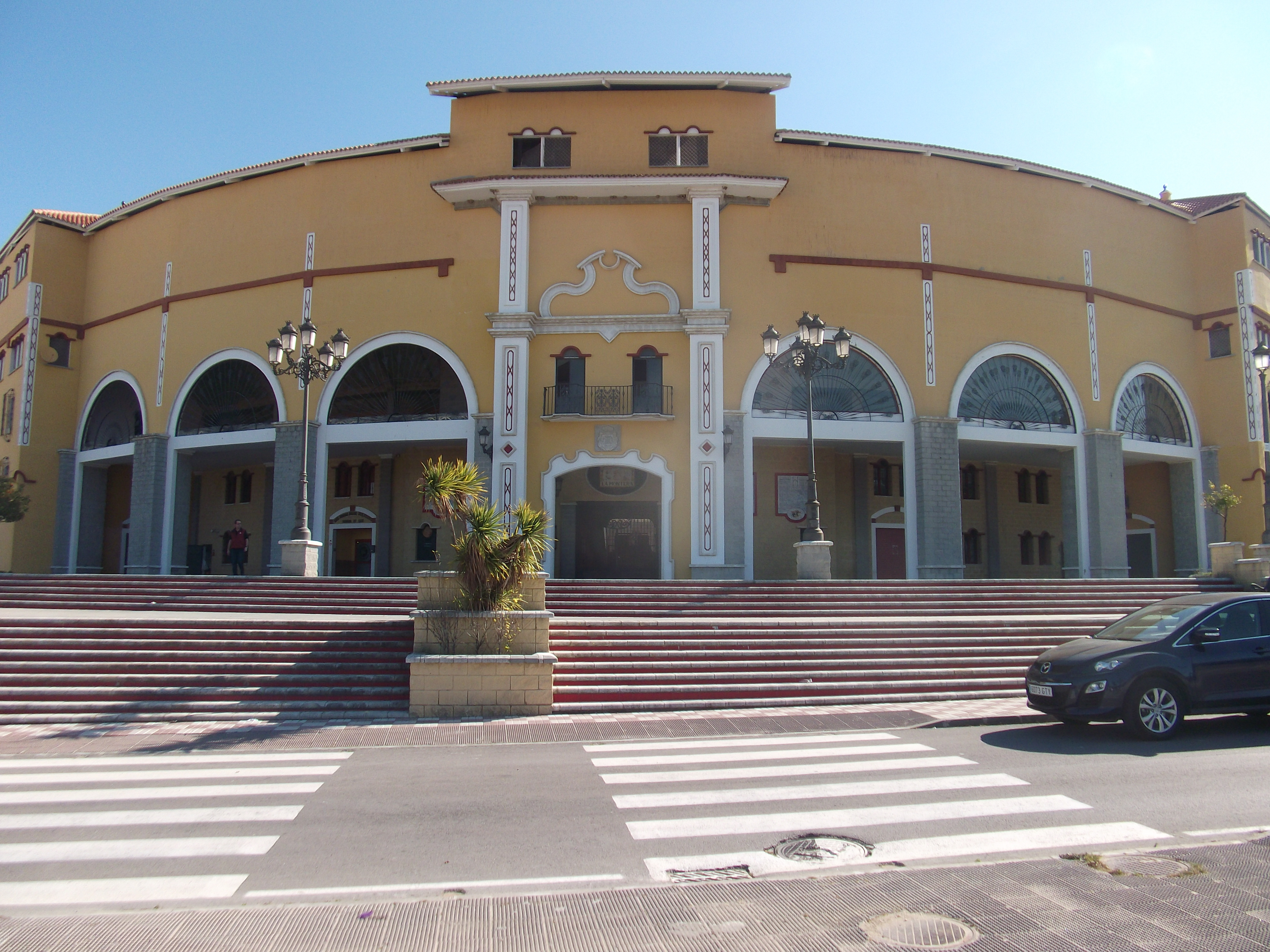
- Interactive map of the Plaza de toros La Montera area

General information
- Type: Bull Ring
- Location: Los Barrios, Spain
- Coordinates: 36°10′45.0″N 5°29′17.8″W
- Construction started: 1998
- Opening: 2000; 26 years ago

The Plaza de toros La Montera is a bull ring in Los Barrios, a town in the province of Cádiz at the southern edge of Spain, close to the British territory of Gibraltar, was opened in 2000.

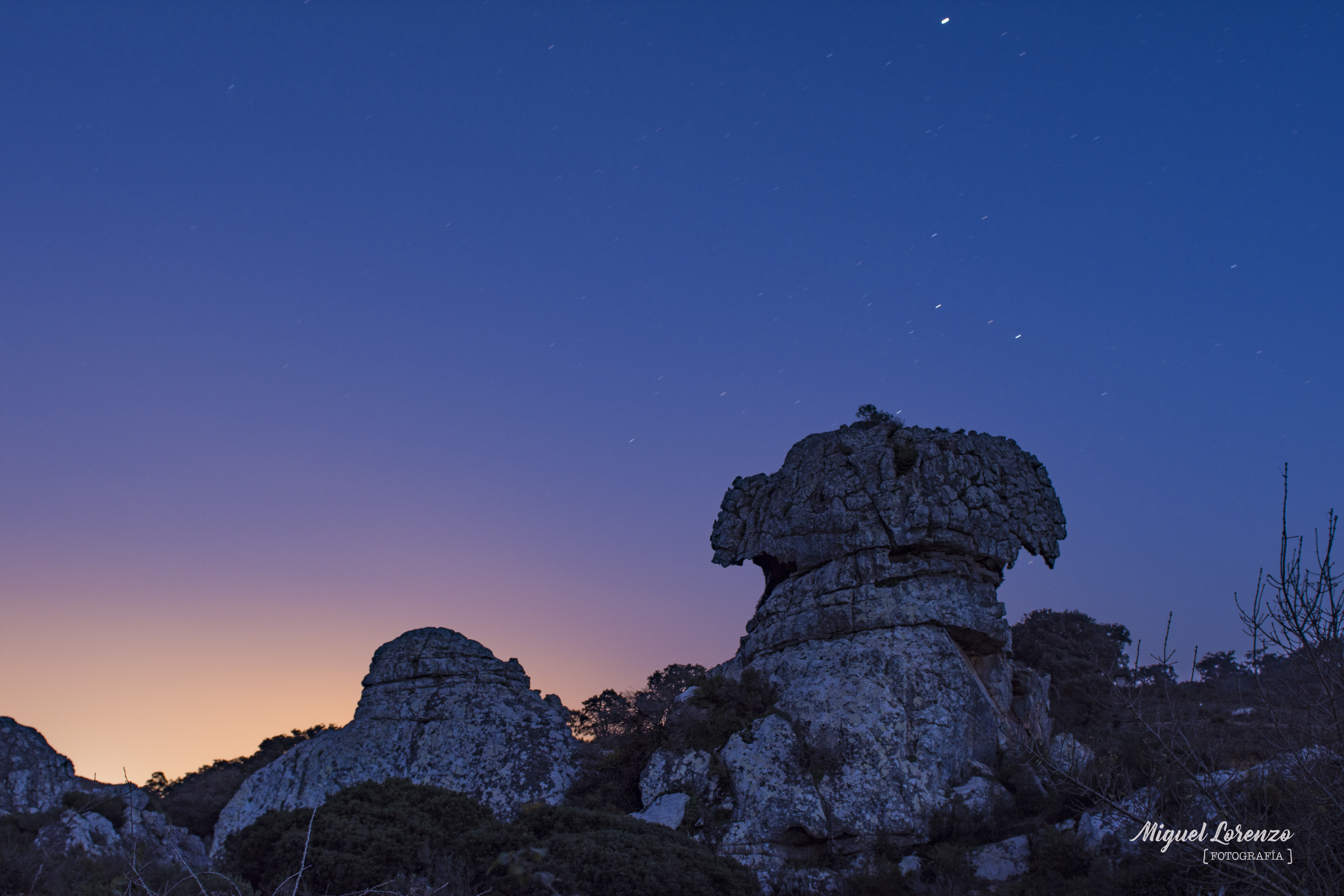
Montera del torero

Named La Montera after the nearby rock formation that looks like a bullfighter's hat (Montera del torero in Spanish).
