= Gibraltar-San Roque Refinery =

Oil refinery in Spain

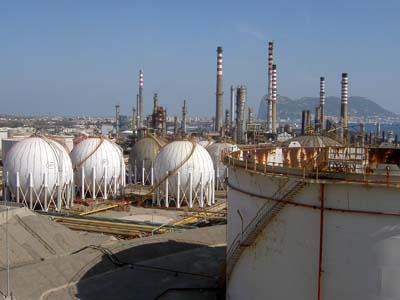
- Gibraltar-San Roque Refinery

- Location of the Gibraltar-San Roque Refinery
- Location: San Roque, Cadiz, Province of Cádiz, Spain; 36°11′08.9″N 5°23′56.3″W

Refinery details
- Owner: CEPSA
- Opened: 1967
- Capacity: 240,000 barrels per day (38,000 m^{3}/d)
- No. of employees: 1000+
- No. of oil tanks: 150+

The Gibraltar-San Roque Refinery (Spanish: Refinería de Gibraltar-San Roque) is an oil refinery owned by Moeve located on the north shore of the Bay of Gibraltar, in Guadarranque Industrial Estate, between Puente Mayorga and the Guadarranque river, in the municipality of San Roque, Cadiz, Spain. It is located next to the Los Barrios Power Plant, which is a coal fueled power station.

It is the largest refinery in the Iberian Peninsula, with a crude oil daily processing capacity of 240,000 barrels per day.

The refinery occupies 150 acres and has a refining capacity of 12 million tons per year, making it the largest Spanish refinery.

The Spanish Government has been accused of having built the refinery deliberately in an effort to negatively affect the British Overseas Territory of Gibraltar, although pollution is indiscriminate and it also affects a large Spanish population in southern Spain.

The results of local air samples by both the Gibraltar and Spanish NGOs and environmental groups are regularly reported to the relevant European Union institutions. Apart from imposing fines on the wealthy CEPSA conglomerate, no other real action is taken.

As of 2018 work began on using Detal technology which will produce linear alkylbenzene, work will take around two years to complete.

== Products produced ==
The refinery currently produces propane, butane, gasoline, aviation fuel, diesel oil and fuel oil.

== Safety record ==
On May 27, 1985, a Japanese ship called Petragen One docked in the refinery and was unloading 20,000 tons of naphtha, which exploded and also caused the Spanish tanker Camponavia to catch fire. 33 people died and 36 were injured. The fire started explosions in the Camponavia, which broke in two and sank in a slick of burning oil. The Japanese ship also snapped in two, leaving only the burning bow and stern visible above the waterline.

On January 21, 2003, the barge of CEPSA Spabunker IV, used to supply fuel to ships crossing the Strait of Gibraltar, sank during a storm on the way from the dock to seek refuge in the port of Algeciras, just a few miles away. The captain died.

In 2007 a particularly serious sulphur incident happened as well as intermittent flaring episodes. The impacts of such upsets on surrounding neighbourhoods had provoked outrage and public protest which led to the Consejería de Medio Ambiente of the Junta de Andalucía to order an independent audit aimed at investigating such incidents.

In September 2011 a large fire could be seen for miles around, with black smoke coming from the refinery.

In May 2014 a report by the World Health Organization showed that the nearby town of La Línea de la Concepción had the worst air quality in Spain. The report concentrated on PM10 and PM2.5 Pollutants in the air, which could only have come from the refinery.

In May 2016 the report by the World Health Organization had placed La Línea as the third worst place in Spain in terms of air quality.
