= Iván Ruiz (footballer) =

Spanish footballer (born 1990)

Personal information
- Full name: Iván Ruiz Pecino
- Date of birth: 16 September 1990 (age 36)
- Place of birth: Los Barrios, Cádiz, Spain
- Position: Midfielder

Team information
- Current team: College 1975
- Number: 21

Youth career
- Cádiz
- Los Barrios
- Balón de Cádiz
- Los Barrios
- Atlético Zabal
- UD Castellar

Senior career*
Years	Team	Apps	(Gls)
2010	Los Barrios	3	(0)
2011	UD Castellar		
2011–2012	Real Ávila		
2012	Dénia		
2013–2014	Los Barrios	12	(1)
2015–16	Gibraltar Phoenix	8	(1)
2016	Manchester 62	3	(1)
2016–2017	San Roque	12	(1)
2017	Los Barrios	7	(0)
2017	Gibraltar Phoenix	9	(1)
2018	Glacis United	26	(2)
2019	San Roque	17	(0)
2019–2022	Lions Gibraltar	39	(4)
2022	St Joseph's	8	(1)
2022–2023	Glacis United	12	(2)
2023–2024	Lions Gibraltar	15	(1)
2025–	College 1975	25	(2)
- * Club domestic league appearances and goals as of 21 November 2026

Iván Ruiz Pecino (born 16 September 1990) is a Spanish footballer who plays as a midfielder.

== Early life ==
Ruiz was born in Los Barrios in the Province of Cádiz, close to Algeciras.

== Club career ==
=== Early career and Football Cracks ===
Ruiz began his career in Spain with a number of sides, including spending time in the academy of Cádiz, and training with their first team. He most notably played for Los Barrios in his early career, making his senior debut in February 2010. Later in the same year, he competed in the 2010 edition of Football Cracks, a Spanish reality TV show dedicated to finding young footballing talent from around the world, sponsored by both Zinedine Zidane and Enzo Francescoli, and hosted by Nico Abad. He won the competition, with the prize being a trial with professional side Atlético Madrid, lasting the entirety of their 2010–11 pre-season preparation.

He left Los Barrios in June 2010, signing autographs for fans upon his departure, and on his arrival at Atlético Madrid he stated that he wished to be the footballing equivalent of David Bisbal, a singer who had won Operación Triunfo, another reality TV show. Atlético Madrid were initially set to go on a tour of Asia, but this was cancelled by the club due to their participation in the 2010 UEFA Super Cup. Due to this, Ruiz was instead offered a chance to train with Atlético Madrid B, which he initially declined, as it was not part of the agreement with Football Cracks, and he was not guaranteed a place in their squad. Ruiz was instead offered a chance to rejoin Los Barrios in the Tercera División, with Getafe and Italian side Palermo reportedly showing interest in him. His father, Roberto, stated that despite the approach from Getafe, Atlético Madrid asked him not to take it up, as he had a commitment to them.

In August 2010, he did eventually take up the club's offer to train with their B Team, on a two-week trial basis, stating that he "felt comfortable on [his] first day at Atlético". Ruiz left the club at the end of his two-week trial, with his father openly expressing their disappointment with the club, stating that the club had not fulfilled the obligations they agreed on Football Cracks, and after training with the subsidiary team, Ruiz was not called up to represent them in any friendly games.

=== Later career ===
In September and October 2010, he trialled with Bulgarian side CSKA Sofia and Italian side Palermo, respectively. The following year he returned to Spain, spending half a season with UD Castellar and trialling unsuccessfully with San Roque, before going on trial with Real Ávila, signing in August 2011. In January 2012, he left the club to sign for Dénia, before a return to Los Barrios; initially training with the side in January 2013, he joined permanently in July of the same year.

Following the expiration of his contract with Los Barrios, he left in September 2014, before moving to Gibraltar and signing with Gibraltar Phoenix. He also played for Manchester 62 before a return to Spain, going on trial with San Roque in August 2016. He eventually joined permanently, before another spell with Los Barrios.

== Career statistics ==
=== Club ===
Appearances and goals by club, season and competition
Club	Season	League			Cup		Other		Total	
Club	Season	Division	Apps	Goals	Apps	Goals	Apps	Goals	Apps	Goals
Los Barrios	2009–10	Tercera División	3	0	0	0	0	0	3	0
Los Barrios	2013–14	Primera Andaluza	12	1	0	0	0	0	12	1
Los Barrios	Total		15	1	0	0	0	0	15	1
Manchester 62	2015–16	Gibraltar Premier Division	3	1	0	0	0	0	3	1
San Roque	2016–17	Tercera División	12	1	0	0	0	0	12	1
Los Barrios	2016–17	Tercera División	7	0	0	0	0	0	7	0
Gibraltar Phoenix	2017–18	Gibraltar Premier Division	9	1	0	0	0	0	9	1
Glacis United	2017–18	Gibraltar Premier Division	14	2	1 (Note: Appearances in the Rock Cup)	0	0	0	15	2
Glacis United	2018–19	Gibraltar Premier Division	12	0	0	0	0	0	12	0
Glacis United	Total		26	2	1	0	0	0	27	2
San Roque	2018–19	División de Honor Andalusia	12	1	0	0	0	0	12	1
Lions Gibraltar	2019–20	Gibraltar National League	16	2	1	0	0	0	17	2
Lions Gibraltar	2020–21	Gibraltar National League	17	1	0	0	0	0	17	1
Lions Gibraltar	2021–22	Gibraltar National League	6	1	0	0	0	0	6	1
Lions Gibraltar	Total		39	4	1	0	0	0	40	4
St Joseph's	2021–22	Gibraltar National League	8	1	1	1	0	0	9	2
Glacis United	2022–23	Gibraltar Football League	12	2	0	0	0	0	12	2
Career total			47	3	2	0	2	1	51	4
