= List of shipwrecks in February 1842 =

The list of shipwrecks in February 1842 includes ships sunk, foundered, wrecked, grounded, or otherwise lost during February 1842.

== 1 February ==
List of shipwrecks: February 1842
Ship	State	Description
John	United Kingdom	The ship was driven ashore at Happisburgh, Norfolk. She was on a voyage from London to South Shields, County Durham. She was later refloated and taken into Great Yarmouth, Norfolk.
Salomon	United Kingdom	The ship was wrecked in the Bay of Biscay. She was on a voyage from London to a Mediterranean port. She was driven ashore near Bayonne, Basses-Pyrénées, France on 10 March.
Union	United Kingdom	The ship was driven ashore at Theddlethorpe, Lincolnshire. She was on a voyage from Ipswich, Suffolk to Newcastle upon Tyne, Northumberland. Union was refloated and put into Grimsby, Lincolnshire.

== 2 February ==
List of shipwrecks: 2 February 1842
Ship	State	Description
Glenroy	United Kingdom	The ship sprang a leak and foundered in the North Sea off Flamborough Head, Yorkshire. Her crew survived. She was on a voyage from South Shields, County Durham to London.
Marjery	United Kingdom	The ship struck a sunken wreck off Lowestoft, Suffolk and was damaged. She was beached at Ipswich, Suffolk on arrival from Middlesbrough, Yorkshire.
Tyne	United Kingdom	The steamship was holed by an anchor and sank at South Shields, County Durham.
Unity	United Kingdom	The schooner was in collision with a brig Undaunted (United Kingdom) and foundered in the English Channel off North Foreland, Kent.

== 3 February ==
List of shipwrecks: 3 February 1842
Ship	State	Description
Jeune Auguste	Belgium	The ship was destroyed by fire off Gonaïves, Haiti.
John	United Kingdom	The ship was wrecked on the South Breaker Ship Bar, in the Atlantic Ocean off the coast of South Carolina, United States. She was on a voyage from Liverpool, Lancashire to Charleston, South Carolina.
Oglethorpe	United Kingdom	The ship was abandoned in the Atlantic Ocean. Her crew were rescued. She was on a voyage from New York, United States to the Clyde.
Rosalie	Bremen	The ship was wrecked on a reef off Grand Bahama, Bahamas. Her crew were rescued. She was on a voyage from Havana, Cuba to Bremen.

== 4 February ==
List of shipwrecks: 4 February 1842
Ship	State	Description
Bruce	United Kingdom	The brig was driven ashore at Flamborough Head, East Riding of Yorkshire. She was refloated and resumed her voyage.
Gem	United Kingdom	The ship ran aground on the Black Rock, off the Isle of Wight. She was on a voyage from Great Yarmouth, Norfolk to Plymouth, Devon. Gem was refloated and resumed her voyage.

== 5 February ==
List of shipwrecks: 5 February 1842
Ship	State	Description
Mulliet	United Kingdom	The ship ran aground on the Herd Sand, in the North Sea off the coast of County Durham. She was on a voyage from Grangemouth, Stirlingshire to South Shields, County Durham. She was refloated the next day and taken into South Shields.
Success	United Kingdom	The ship ran aground on the Herd Sand. She was on a voyage from Ipswich, Suffolk to South Shields. She was refloated the next day and taken into South Shields.
Thomas Tyson	United Kingdom	The ship was wrecked on the Indian Rocks, in the West Indies. Her crew survived.
Union	United Kingdom	The ship was driven ashore at Flamborough Head, Yorkshire. She was on a voyage from Great Yarmouth, Norfolk to Newcastle upon Tyne, Northumberland. She was refloated and taken into Bridlington in a leaky condition.
Victory	United States	The ship was wrecked on Caja de Muertos, Puerto Rico. Her crew were rescued. She was on a voyage from Saint Vincent to Liverpool, New York.
William Salter	United Kingdom	The barque ran aground off Point Nepean, New South Wales and was consequently beached at Pope's Eye. Her crew survived. She was on a voyage from Quebec City Province of Canada, British North America to Sydney, New South Wales.

== 7 February ==
List of shipwrecks: 7 February 1842
Ship	State	Description
Brilliant	United States	The ship was driven onto the Saint Pierre Rocks, off Cette, Hérault, France and was wrecked.
Colchester	United Kingdom	The paddle tug ran aground off Berwick upon Tweed, Northumberland and was damaged. She was refloated and taken into Berwick upon Tweed for repairs.
Latona	United Kingdom	The ship was driven ashore and wrecked at Courtmacsherry, County Cork.

== 9 February ==
List of shipwrecks: February 1842
Ship	State	Description
Arden	United Kingdom	The brig was wrecked at Bodfean, Caernarfonshire. Three crew were rescued by a lifeboat.
Balloon	United Kingdom	The ship was driven ashore and severely damaged at Bridlington, Yorkshire. She was on a voyage from Bridlington to Whitby, Yorkshire. Balloon was later refloated and taken into Bridlington.
Ocean Queen	United Kingdom	The ship was driven ashore in Roundstone Bay. She was on a voyage from Liverpool, Lancashire to London. She was later refloated.
Scotia	United Kingdom	The brig was driven ashore at Garron Point, County Antrim. She was on a voyage from Glasgow, Renfrewshire to Gibraltar.
Solway	United Kingdom	The brig was wrecked at Pwllheli, Caernarfonshire. Her eleven crew were rescued.
Victoria	United Kingdom	The steamship ran ashore and was wrecked at Port Mooar, near Maughold Head, Isle of Man. All on board were rescued. She was on a voyage from Fleetwood, Lancashire to Belfast, County Antrim.

== 10 February ==
List of shipwrecks: 10 February 1842
Ship	State	Description
Europe	United States	The ship ran aground on the Gingerbread Grounds. She was on a voyage from Havre de Grâce, Seine-Inférieure, France to New Orleans, Louisiana. She was refloated on 15 February and taken into Nassau, Bahamas.
Hazard	United Kingdom	The ship was driven ashore near Allonby, Cumberland. She was refloated on 28 February and taken into Maryport, Cumberland.
John Askew	United Kingdom	The ship was driven ashore north of Ramsey, Isle of Man. she was on a voyage from Liverpool, Lancashire to Wigton, Cumberland.

== 11 February ==
List of shipwrecks: 11 February 1842
Ship	State	Description
Amedée Constance	France	The ship was driven ashore at Cherbourg, Seine-Inférieure. She was on a voyage from London, United Kingdom to Guadeloupe.
Garland	United Kingdom	The ship was driven ashore and wrecked at Cape San Blas, Florida Territory with the loss of two of her crew. She was on a voyage from Liverpool, Lancashire to Apalachicola, Florida Territory.
James	United Kingdom	The ship was driven ashore at Rathmullan, County Donegal. She was on a voyage from Troon, Ayrshire to Sligo.
Wheaton	United Kingdom	The ship was driven ashore at Hope Cove, Devon. Her crew were rescued.

== 12 February ==
List of shipwrecks: February 1842
Ship	State	Description
Combe	United Kingdom	The ship was wrecked on North Uist, Outer Hebrides with the loss of two of her crew. She was on a voyage from Newcastle upon Tyne, Northumberland to Sligo.
Jessie	United Kingdom	The sloop sank at the mouth of the River Tay with the loss of all hands.
Margaret	United Kingdom	The sloop was run down and sunk in the North Sea off Manuel Head, Fife by Monarch (United Kingdom). Her crew were rescued by Monarch. Margaret was on a voyage from Stockton-on-Tees, County Durham to Dundee, Forfarshire.
Montcherie	France	The brig was wrecked near Maldonado, Uruguay. Her crew were rescued.

== 13 February ==
List of shipwrecks: 13 February 1842
Ship	State	Description
Amanda	United Kingdom	The ship was driven ashore and severely damaged at Cobh, County Cork. She was on a voyage from Malta to Carlisle, Cumberland. Amanda was refloated.
Bombay Packet	United Kingdom	The ship was driven ashore in Liverpool Bay. She was on a voyage from Liverpool, Lancashire to Africa. She was refloated and put back to Liverpool.
Francis Stanton	United Kingdom	The ship was driven ashore at Cape Henry, North Carolina, United States. Her crew were rescued. She was on a voyage from Liverpool to Baltimore, Maryland, United States.
Mary Jane	United Kingdom	The ship was driven ashore and damaged at Cobh. She was on a voyage from Malta to Carlisle. She was refloated.
Queen Victoria	United Kingdom	The ship was driven ashore at Campamento, Spain. She was on a voyage from Marseille, Bouches-du-Rhône to London. She was refloated and resumed her voyage.

== 14 February ==
List of shipwrecks: 14 February 1842
Ship	State	Description
HDMS Allart	Royal Danish Navy	The brig was lost between Portorico and St. Jan, Danish West Indies. Her crew were rescued.
Elbe	Hamburg	The ship was driven ashore by ice at Nienstedten. She was on a voyage from St Ubes, Portugal to Hamburg.
Provens Haab	Belgium	The ship was driven ashore on "Farder", Norway. She was on a voyage from Grangemouth, Stirlingshire, United Kingdom to Antwerp or Ostend, West Flanders.
Rowland	United States	The ship was struck by lightning and damaged by fire in the Atlantic Ocean. She was on a voyage from Savannah, Georgia to Havre de Grâce, Seine-Inférieure, France.

== 15 February ==
List of shipwrecks: 15 February 1842
Ship	State	Description
Alerte	Denmark	The brig was wrecked near San Juan, Puerto Rico.
City of Limerick	United Kingdom	The ship was severely damaged by fire in Black Sod Bay. She was on a voyage from Glasgow, Renfrewshire to Limerick.
Emma	United Kingdom	The barque was abandoned in the Atlantic Ocean (49°20′N 20°15′W). Her crew were rescued by Bayman (United Kingdom). Emma was on a voyage from Newport, Monmouthshire to Boston, Massachusetts, United States.
Favourite	United Kingdom	The ship ran aground on the Goswick Ridge, in the North Sea off the coast of Northumberland. She was refloated and taken into Lindisfarne.
Helena	United Kingdom	The ship ran aground on the Plough Seat, in the North Sea off the coast of Northumberland. She was refloated and put into Lindisfarne in a severely damaged condition.
Isabella	United Kingdom	The sloop was driven ashore in the River Tay and was abandoned by her crew. She was subsequently taken into Arbroath, Forfarshire.
Majestic	United Kingdom	The steam tug was driven ashore on the coast of Northumberland. She was refloated on 18 February and taken into Berwick upon Tweed, Northumberland for repairs.
Paul Jones	United States	The ship was wrecked on Saint Domingo. Her crew were rescued. She was on a voyage from Cádiz, Spain to New Orleans, Louisiana.
Trevennance	United Kingdom	The coaster was driven ashore at Port Talbot, Glamorgan. She was on a voyage from Swansea, to Port Talbot. Trevennance was refloated on 17 February.

== 16 February ==
List of shipwrecks: 16 February 1842
Ship	State	Description
Confidence	Prussia	The ship ran aground off Hasle, Bornholm, Denmark. Her crew were rescued. She was on a voyage from Dundee, Forfarshire, United Kingdom to Memel. She was refloated on 1 March and taken into Hasle.

== 17 February ==
List of shipwrecks: 17 February 1842
Ship	State	Description
Daniel Killer	United Kingdom	The ship was wrecked on a reef off Bermuda. Her crew were rescued. She was on a voyage from New York to a Spanish port.
Eliza Ann	United Kingdom	The ship ran aground on a reef off Bald Tusket Island, Nova Scotia, British North America with the loss of two lives. She was on a voyage from Matanzas, Cuba to Halifax, Nova Scotia. She was refloated and taken into the Argyle River.
Lewis Cass	United States	The ship was wrecked on a reef off Bermuda. Her crew were rescued. She was on a voyage from New York to Port Leon, Florida Territory.
Royalist	United Kingdom	The ship ran aground on the Gunfleet Sand, in the North Sea off the coast of Essex. She was on a voyage from South Shields, County Durham to London. She was refloated and resumed her voyage.

== 18 February ==
List of shipwrecks: 18 February 1842
Ship	State	Description
Christine Marie	Duchy of Holstein	The ship ran aground on the Skagen Reef. She was later refloated and put into Frederikshavn, Denmark.
General Davies	United Kingdom	The ship ran aground at New Orleans, Louisiana, United States.
Glenview	United Kingdom	The ship ran aground at New Orleans.
Negociator	United Kingdom	The ship ran aground in the Mississippi River.
Trafalgar	United Kingdom	The ship was wrecked on Skagen, Denmark with the loss of two of her crew. She was on a voyage from Newcastle upon Tyne, Northumberland to Stettin.

== 19 February ==
List of shipwrecks: 19 February 1842
Ship	State	Description
Flora	United Kingdom	The ship was driven ashore and wrecked on Arran, Inner Hebrides. Her crew were rescued. She was on a voyage from Troon, Ayrshire to Saint Thomas, Virgin Islands.
Kent	United Kingdom	The steamship ran aground and was wrecked at Barton on Sea, Hampshire. All on board were rescued. She was on a voyage from Torquay, Devon to Southampton, Hampshire.
Saladin	United States	The ship was abandoned in the Atlantic Ocean. She was on a voyage from New York to Liverpool, Lancashire, United Kingdom.
Scipio	United Kingdom	The brig was driven ashore at Belmullet, County Mayo with the loss of her captain. She was on a voyage from Greenock, Renfrewshire to Trinidad.

== 20 February ==
List of shipwrecks: 20 February 1842
Ship	State	Description
Ann and Jane	United Kingdom	The ship was driven ashore north of Bridlington, Yorkshire. She was refloated and taken into Bridlington.
Ellen	United Kingdom	The ship struck a sunken rock off Porto, Portugal and was holed. She was on a voyage from Porto to London. She was towed into Vigo, Spain.

== 21 February ==
List of shipwrecks: 21 February 1842
Ship	State	Description
Isabel	United Kingdom	The ship sank at Stampalia, Greece. Her crew were rescued.
Heroine	United Kingdom	The ship was wrecked near Laguna. Her crew were rescued.

== 22 February ==
List of shipwrecks: 22 February 1842
Ship	State	Description
Buoyant	United States	The barque ran ashore in the Brazos River with the loss of seven of her crew.
Ocean Queen	United Kingdom	The ship struck rocks off Rota Point, Spain. She was on a voyage from Newcastle upon Tyne, Northumberland to Genoa, Kingdom of Sardinia. Ocean Queen was refloated and put into Gibraltar, where she arrived on 24 February.
Trent	United Kingdom	The ship was wrecked on the Hauxley Rocks, on the coast of Northumberland. Her crew were rescued. She was on a voyage from Leith, Lothian to London.

== 23 February ==
List of shipwrecks: 23 February 1842
Ship	State	Description
Collector	United Kingdom	The ship was wrecked near Saint Lucia.
James and Ann	United Kingdom	The ship ran aground on the Gunfleet Sand, in the North Sea off the coast of Essex. She was on a voyage from London to Newcastle upon Tyne, Northumberland. She was refloated and resumed her voyage.

== 24 February ==
List of shipwrecks: 24 February 1842
Ship	State	Description
Gemelo	Spain	The ship was lost south of Aveiro, Portugal. She was on a voyage from "Luarzzes" to Barcelona.
Mary	United Kingdom	The ship was driven ashore and wrecked east of Almería, Spain. Her crew were rescued. She was on a voyage from Hull to Livorno, Grand Duchy of Tuscany.
Resource	United Kingdom	The ship foundered off Sardinia with the loss of seven of her nine crew. She was on a voyage from Naples, Kingdom of the Two Sicilies to Falmouth, Cornwall.

== 25 February ==
List of shipwrecks: 25 February 1842
Ship	State	Description
Despatch	United Kingdom	The ship was wrecked on the Kentish Knock. Her seven crew survived.
Elizabeth	United Kingdom	The ship was driven ashore in Kilcattan Bay. Her crew were rescued. She was on a voyage from Runcorn, Cheshire to Belfast, County Antrim. She was refloated on 12 March.

== 26 February ==
List of shipwrecks: 26 February 1842
Ship	State	Description
Lively	United Kingdom	The ship was wrecked on the Bembridge Ledge, off the Isle of Wight. Her crew were rescued. She was on a voyage from Jersey, Channel Islands to Portsmouth, Hampshire.

== 27 February ==
List of shipwrecks: 27 February 1842
Ship	State	Description
Adelphia	United Kingdom	The sloop foundered in the Irish Sea off the coast of Anglesey. Her crew were rescued by HMS Medusa (Royal Navy). She was on a voyage from Bangor, County Down to Liverpool, Lancashire.
Adonia	United Kingdom	The brigantine was wrecked near Portavogie, County Down. Her crew were rescued. She was on a voyage from Ardrossan, Ayrshire to Plymouth, Devon.
Camilla	United States	The ship ran aground off "Wittenburgen". She was on a voyage from Charleston, South Carolina to Hamburg. Camilla was later refloated.
Cruikston Castle	United Kingdom	The ship was driven ashore south of Savannah, Georgia, United States. She was on a voyage from the Clyde to Savannah. She had been refloated by 19 March.
Diana	United Kingdom	The brig was driven ashore and severely damaged at Buddon Ness, Forfarshire.
Fifeshire	United Kingdom	The barque sank after hitting Arrow Rock at the entrance to Nelson Harbour, New Zealand. She was outward bound from Nelson to China.
Jane	United Kingdom	The ship was abandoned in the North Sea 14 nautical miles (26 km) east of the Farne Islands, Northumberland. Her crew were rescued. She was on a voyage from Limekilns, Fife to Travemünde, Prussia.
Lady Selina	United Kingdom	The ship was wrecked on Skomer, Pembrokeshire. Her crew were rescued. She was on a voyage from Wexford to Llanelly, Glamorgan.
Lord Abercrombie	United Kingdom	The barque was wrecked near Workington, Cumberland. Her crew were rescued.
Sovereign	United Kingdom	The schooner was driven ashore at Kirkcudbright.
Tiger	United Kingdom	The ship was driven into Elizabeth (United Kingdom) and then driven ashore at Westport, County Mayo.

== 28 February ==
List of shipwrecks: 28 February 1842
Ship	State	Description
Adelphia	United Kingdom	The ship foundered in the Irish Sea off the coast of Anglesey. Her crew were rescued. She was on a voyage from Bangor, County Down to Liverpool, Lancashire.
Athol	United Kingdom	The ship ran aground on the Baccar Reef, off Tobago. She capsized and was wrecked.
Mary Ann	United Kingdom	The ship was in collision with Peggy (United Kingdom) at Hull, Yorkshire and was beached.

== Unknown date ==
List of shipwrecks: Unknown date in February 1842
Ship	State	Description
Caldee	United Kingdom	The ship ran aground on the Arklow Banks, in the Irish Sea off the coast of County Wicklow on or after 26 February. She was on a voyage from Greenock, Renfrewshire to Mauritius. Caldee was later refloated and put back to Greenock, where she arrived on 9 March.
Clyde	United Kingdom	The ship was driven ashore in the Belfast Lough. She was on a voyage from Liverpool, Lancashire to Tampico, Mexico. She was refloated on 11 February and taken into Belfast, County Antrim.
Elizabeth	United States	The ship was driven ashore in the Mississippi River. She was on a voyage from New Orleans, Louisiana to Cádiz, Spain. She was refloated and consequently put into Nassau, Bahamas, where she arrived on 1 March.
Faulkland	United Kingdom	The ship was driven ashore and wrecked at Naples, Kingdom of the Two Sicilies before 9 February with the loss of all but her captain.
Gjemsoe Kloster, Glernso Kloster or Gremso Kloster	Norway	The ship foundered in the North Sea off the coast of Norway between 1 and 12 February. She was on a voyage from Langesund to a French port. The ship was driven ashore near Soggendal on 12 February.
Halvert	France	The ship was wrecked near Brest, Finistère in the week ending 7 February. Eleven crew survived.
Isabel	United Kingdom	The ship was wrecked on Stampalia, Greece. She was on a voyage from Adalia, Ottoman Empire to London.
Jean	United Kingdom	The ship was driven ashore near Roseneath Point, Dunbartonshire before 12 February.
Mary Dixon	(United Kingdom of Great Britain and Ireland) New South Wales	The ship was driven ashore at "Fort Drake".
Melona	United Kingdom	The ship was driven ashore near Scarborough, Yorkshire. She was on a voyage from South Shields, County Durham to Jersey, Channel Islands. Melona was refloated and proceeded on her voyage, but put into Ramsgate, Kent, where she arrived on 1 March.
Oceana	France	The ship was wrecked in Old Harbour Bay, Jamaica. All on board were rescued. She was on a voyage from Havre de Grâce, Seine-Inférieure to New Orleans, Louisiana.
Victor	France	The ship was wrecked on the Almadies, off the coast of Senegal before 5 February. All on board were rescued.
