= María Ladvenant =

Spanish stage actress

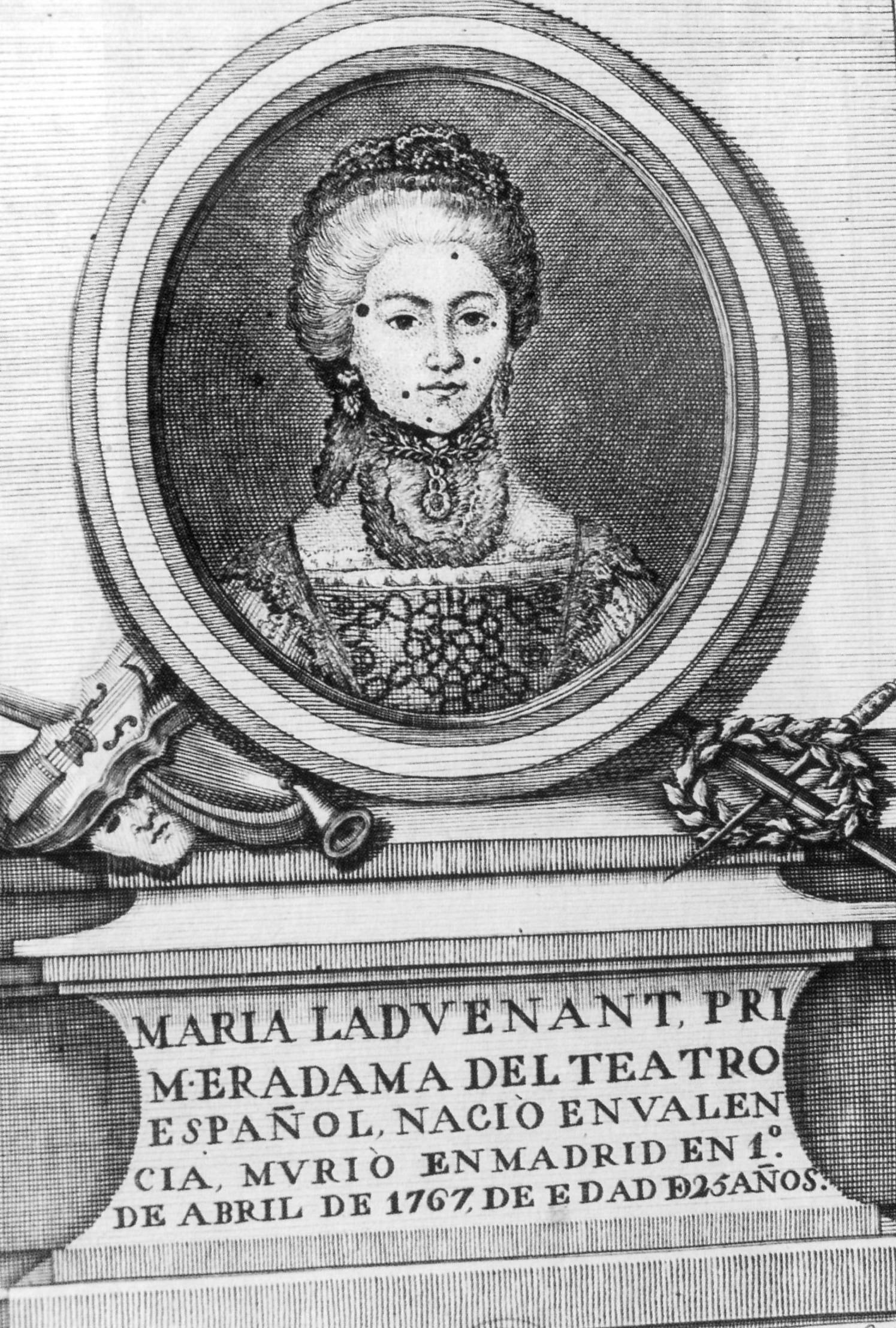
María Ladvenant

María Ladvenant (1741, Valencia–1767, Madrid) was a Spanish stage actress.

Her short and successful but tumultuous career and her early death made her the subject of legend and she was celebrated by authors such as José Cadalso, Leandro Fernández de Moratín and Jovellanos.
