= Torre del Rocadillo =

Coordinates: 36°10′56″N 5°24′33″W

Rocadillo Tower
- Torre del Rocadillo (Spanish)
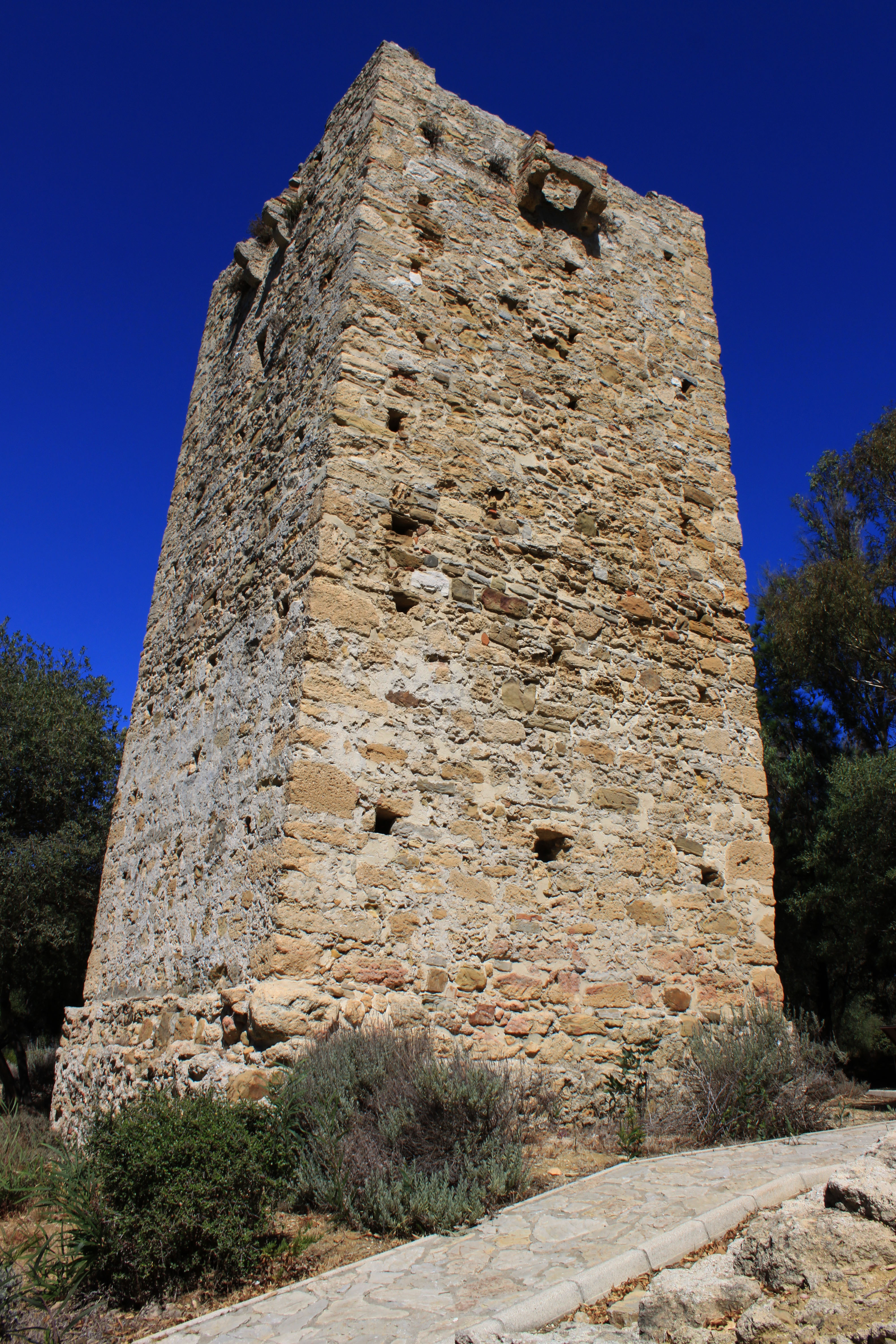

- Location within Spain
- Location: San Roque, Spain

History
- Built: 16th century

Spanish Cultural Heritage
- Official name: Torre del Rocadillo
- Type: Non-movable

Torre del Rocadillo is a historic ruined tower, located about a mile to the west of Puente Mayorga in the municipality of San Roque in the Province of Cádiz, Andalusia, Spain. It was constructed in the 16th century.
