= Pinar del Rey =

Pinar del Rey may refer to:

- Pinar del Rey (Madrid), a ward (barrio) of Madrid, Spain
  - Pinar del Rey (Madrid Metro), a railway station
- Pinar del Rey (park), in San Roque, Cádiz, Spain
