= Taraguilla =

- Settlement
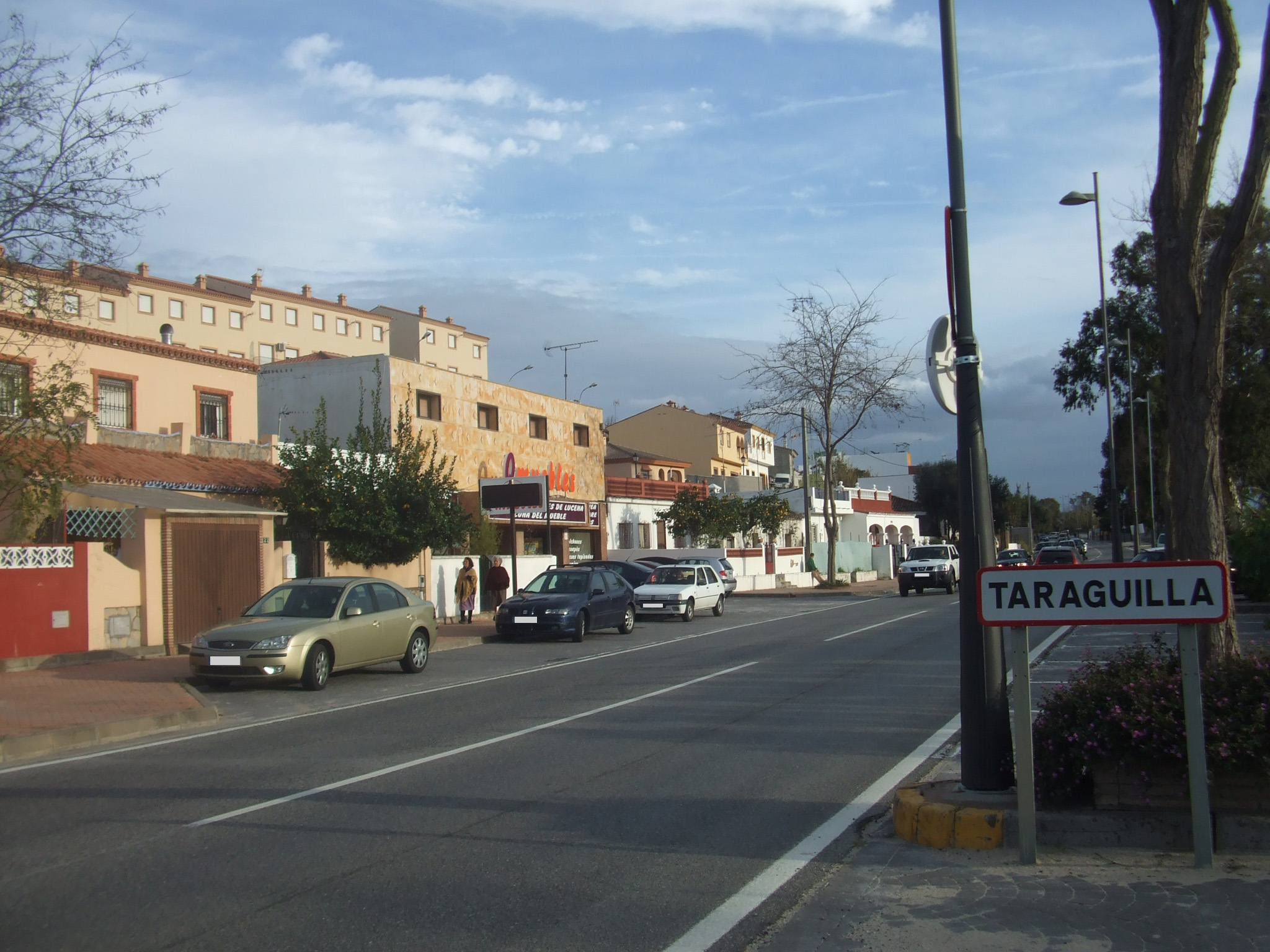

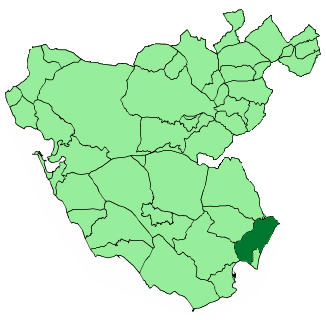
- Location of Taraguilla

- Location in Spain
- Coordinates: 36°12′22″N 5°25′25″W
- Country: Spain
- Autonomous community: Andalusia
- Province: Cádiz
- Comarca: Campo de Gibraltar
- Judicial district: San Roque, Cadiz

Population (2009)
  - Total: 3,057
- Demonym(s): Taraguillense, Taraguillero/a
- Time zone: UTC+1 (CET)
  - Summer (DST): UTC+2 (CEST)
- Postal code: 11369 (Carteia, Guadarranque, Miraflores y Taraguilla)
- Dialing code: (+34) 956 78 XX XX
- Official language(s): Spanish

Taraguilla (sometimes called Taraguillas) is a small town located near Algeciras in the Province of Cadiz.

== Description ==
Taraguilla lies within the municipality of San Roque, about 3 kilometres (1.9 mi) to the west of the centre of San Roque, and it is located in San Roque's Distrito Interior. Immediately to the north is the community of Estación de San Roque, built around the eponymous railway station, while the community of Miraflores is situated just to the east. The A-405 road to Jimena de la Frontera runs to the west of Taraguilla and the Autovía A-7 defines the southern edge of the town. To the west, across the A-405 road, is the Guadarranque river. In 2010 a bypass was built that improved links to the A-405 and the A-7 whilst avoiding Taraguille. The surrounding area is heavily industrialised. The CEPSA Gibraltar-San Roque oil refinery is located a short distance to the south on the other side of the A-7. A number of bus routes pass through Taraguilla.
