= Refinería de Santa Cruz de Tenerife =

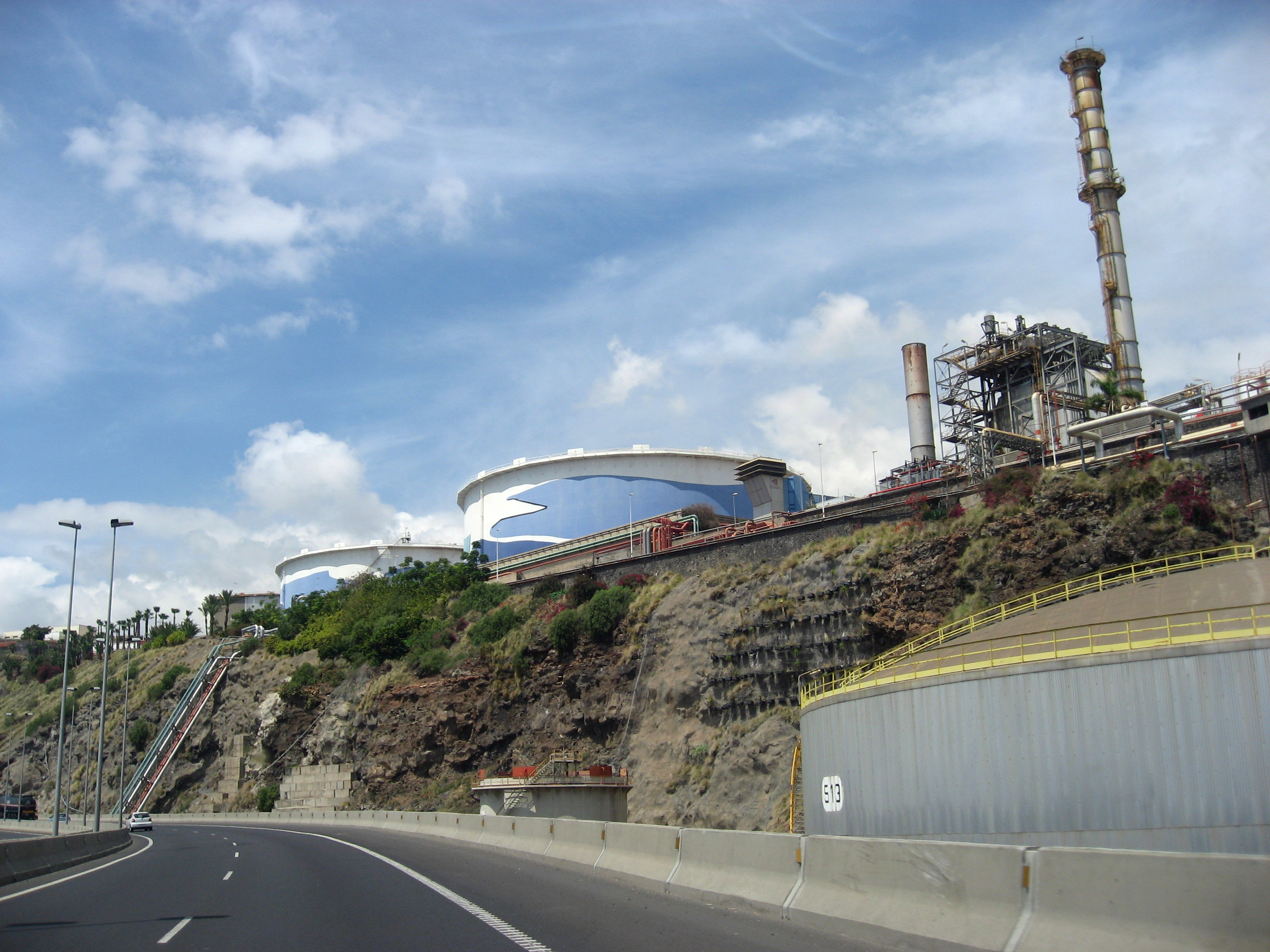
- Refinería de Santa Cruz de Tenerife
- Interactive map of Refinería de Santa Cruz de Tenerife
- Location: Santa Cruz de Tenerife, Santa Cruz de Tenerife, Spain; 28°27′10″N 16°15′53″W

Refinery details
- Operator: Compañía Española de Petróleos
- Opened: 1930
- Capacity: 4.8 million tonnes/year
- No. of employees: 436

The Refinería de Santa Cruz de Tenerife is an oil refinery in Santa Cruz de Tenerife, Tenerife, Canary Islands, Spain.

The refinery, located just outside Santa Cruz de Tenerife, was the first refinery built in Spain. When it opened in November 1930, it had a refining capacity of 250,000 tons. It was built in Tenerife due to the Oil Monopoly Law of 1927 (Spanish: Ley del Monopolio de Petróleos de 1927), which created the state-owned Campsa company and prohibited privately owned oil industries in mainland Spain.

It supplied the Canary Islands with fuel (and hence electrical energy), as well as refueling ships at the port of Santa Cruz de Tenerife, and providing petroleum products to Africa and the Americas. It also provided petroleum products to mainland Spain until the Gibraltar-San Roque Refinery came online in the 1960s.

It was renovated in the 1980s, including the installation of a digital control room. By 2008 it was refining 4,500,000 tonnes per year, occupying 573,000 square metres (6,170,000 sq ft). In 2001 it was the first Canarian industry to follow the Eco-Management and Audit Scheme.

The refinery was shut down in 2015. In 2018, it was announced that the refinery would be dismantled, with 2/3 of the land used for public purposes and 1/3 used commercially.
