= Plaza de toros de San Roque =

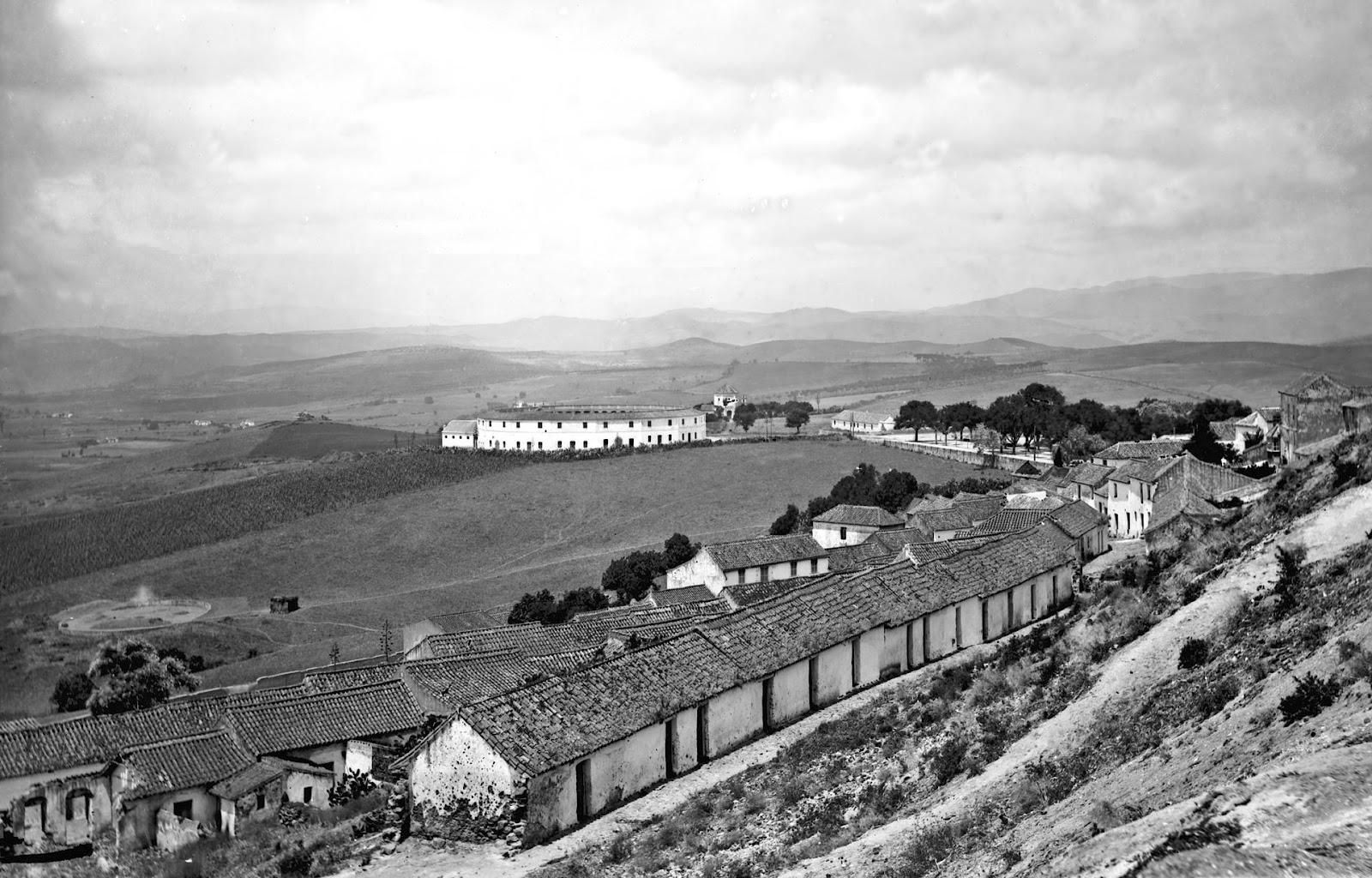
- Interactive map of the Plaza de toros de San Roque area

General information
- Type: Bull Ring
- Location: San Roque, Cádiz, Spain
- Coordinates: 36°12′33.2″N 5°23′23.4″W
- Construction started: 1853
- Opening: 1853; 173 years ago

The Plaza de toros de San Roque is a bull ring in San Roque, a town in the province of Cádiz at the southern edge of Spain, close to the British territory of Gibraltar, was opened in 1853.

== History ==
The Feria Real de San Roque (Royal Fair of San Roque in English), is the city's main yearly Street fair, held on the second Tuesday of August. The fair begins with the coronation ceremony of the juvenile and child queens and their respective courts, although the stands and attractions located in the Fairground El Ejido do not open until Wednesday, the day of the inaugural cavalcade. The Royal Fair closes on a Sunday night with a fireworks show and at 7am on the Monday with the Running of the Bulls known locally as Toro del Aguardiente which has occurred yearly since 1649, named as terrified participants are given a shot of the strong alcoholic spirit ‘Aguardiente’ for courage, before running with the bulls to the Plaza de toros de San Roque, marking the end of the fair.
