= Santa María la Coronada Church =

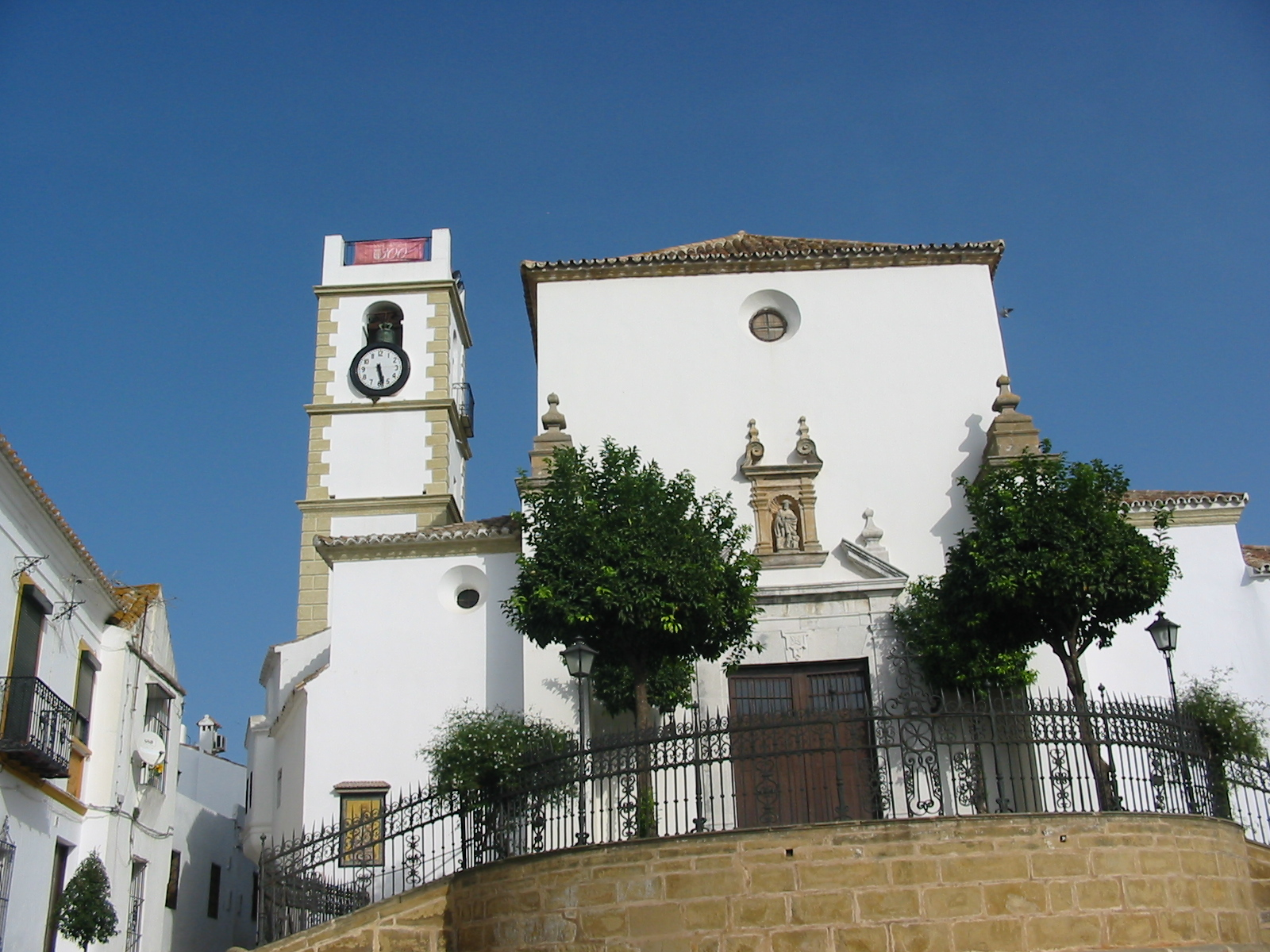
- Santa María la Coronada Church
- Santa María la Coronada Church
- 36.2098°N 5.3841°W
- Country: Spain
- Denomination: Roman Catholic

History
- Dedicated: 1735

Santa María la Coronada Church is a parish church in the town of San Roque in the Province of Cádiz, Spain.

== Description ==
The church was reputedly consecrated to Saint Mary the Crowned because it was named after the Gibraltar main church by the early inhabitants who had fled after the Capture of Gibraltar in 1704. The main building dates from the 18th century and features Spanish-Tuscan architecture and Baroque artwork. The church is said to be in a better condition than it might due to the priest who had charge of it in 1704. It is said that the British soldiers went on a spree after they had taken Gibraltar and every local church was desecrated with the exception of this church because the priest stood his ground and his bravery created respect in the drunken sailors. Work began in 1735 on the construction of a church over the foundations of the 1508 Chapel of Saint Roch.The church was declared a listed building (Spanish: Bien de Interés Cultural) in 1974.

On the main altar, is the statue of Saint Mary the Crowned which is honoured alongside Saint Sebastian and Saint Joseph. These 15th century statues pre-date the 1735 rebuilding as they were smuggled out of Gibraltar after 1704 after the Exodus of Gibraltar (the exodus of the Spanish population of Gibraltar after it was taken over by Anglo-Dutch forces during the War of the Spanish Succession). Two side chapels are reserved for The Holy Burial and The Most Holy Christ of Humbleness and Patience statues which were also brought as part of the exodus. The image of the Most Holy Christ of the Happy Death is the work of San Roque-born sculptor Luis Ortega Bru. José Cadalso, a local poet, playwright, essayist (author of Cartas marruecas), and soldier who was killed during the Great Siege of Gibraltar in 1782 is buried in one of the side chapels. The church has the Gibraltar parish records from 1556 until 1704, as they were taken there by the inhabitants of Gibraltar when they left the town in 1704 and settled down in what today is San Roque.
