= Luis Ortega Bru =

Spanish sculptor

- Born: September 16, 1916
- Died: November 21, 1982 (aged 66)
- Education: School of Arts and Crafts of Linea de la Concepcion
- Notable work: "La Piedad"
- Style: Christian figures
- Awards: Primer Premio Nacional de Escultura

Luis Ortega Brú (September 16, 1916 – November 21, 1982) was a Spanish sculptor and carver. He was famed for his Christian figures, especially Jesus and the Virgin Mary.

== Biography ==
A native of San Roque, Cádiz, his father was a potter, who influenced him from quite a young age with clay figures. In 1931, he studied sculpture at the School of Arts and Crafts of Linea de la Concepcion, and in 1934 received drawing lessons with a teacher and poet from San Roque, José Domingo de Mena.

His parents were shot during the Spanish Civil War, and in 1940 he was sentenced to three years' imprisonment for the offense of aiding the rebellion. In 1944 he moved to Seville, enrolling in the School of Applied Arts. In this city he became known in art circles, making his first exhibition in 1949. In 1952 he received the Primer Premio Nacional de Escultura (National Award for Sculpture) for "La Piedad" ("Piety"). In 1955 he moved to Madrid as a master sculptor of the Talleres Arte de Granada, later opening his own workshop in the capital. In 1978 he returned to Seville, working in the studio of Guzmán Bejarano. He died in Seville in 1982.

There is a museum dedicated to his work in his home town and his local parish church features his Most Holy Christ of the Happy Death.
