= Los Barrios Power Plant =

Power station in Los Barrios, Spain

Los Barrios
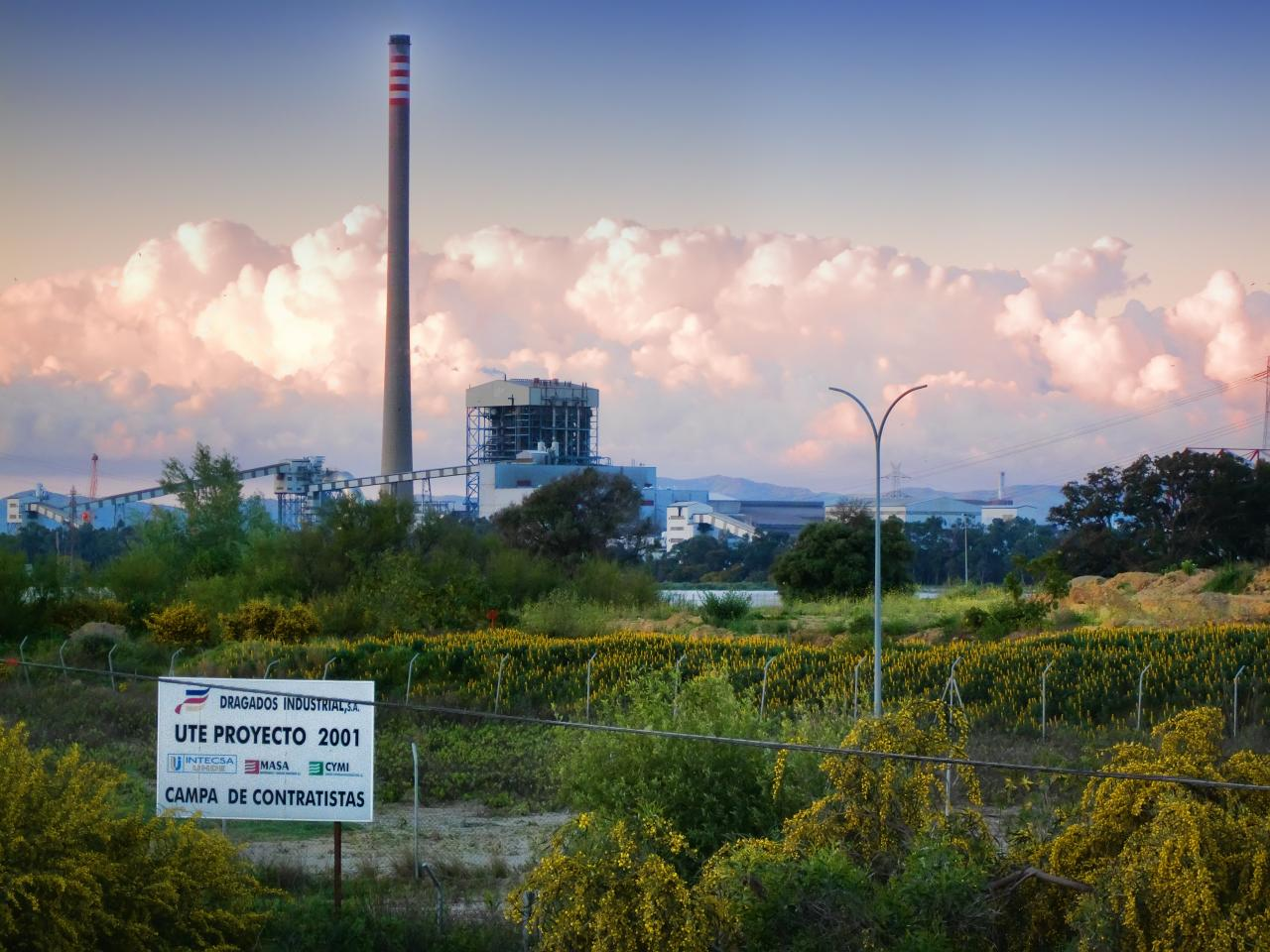
- Country: Spain
- Location: Los Barrios
- Coordinates: 36°10′58″N 5°25′12″W
- Status: Operational
- Commission date: 1985
- Owner: E.ON
- Operator: E.ON

Thermal power station
- Primary fuel: Coal

Power generation
- Units operational: 1
- Make and model: General Electric
- Nameplate capacity: 567 MW

External links
- Commons: Related media on Commons

The Los Barrios Power Plant coal-fired power station is based on the Rankine Cycle. It is located in the municipality of Los Barrios in southern Spain, next to the Gibraltar-San Roque Refinery.

The plant is kept in reserve for Spain's electricity grid. It provides direct employment to over 200 employees and it has a capacity of 567.5 MW.
