= Feria Real de San Roque =

Royal Fair of San Roque Feria Real de San Roque
- Dates: second Tuesday of August, ending on a Sunday
- Locations: San Roque, Cádiz, Spain
- Country: Spain

The Feria Real de San Roque, known as the Royal Fair of San Roque in English, is San Roque's main street fair, held on the second Tuesday of each August. It is located in the El Ejido fairground.

== Activities ==
The fair begins with the coronation ceremony of the juvenile and child queens and their respective courts. The stands and attractions located in the fairground open on Wednesday, the day of the inaugural cavalcade.

The Spanish word feria originally designates a fair (agricultural, books, ...). Bullfights are often held on the occasion of fairs, so the Spaniards came to designate by the term "fair" a series of bullfights organized on this occasion, and often - especially in Andalusia - the festivities that accompany these bullfights. In many parts of Spain, bullfights festivities and feria are managed independently.

The Royal Fair closes on a Sunday night with a fireworks show and at 7am on the Monday with the Running of the Bulls known locally as Toro del Aguardiente which has occurred yearly since 1649, named as terrified participants are given a shot of the strong alcoholic spirit ‘Aguardiente’ for courage, before running with the bulls to the San Roque bullring, marking the end of the fair.
