= San Roque railway station =

Railway station in San Roque, Spain

San Roque-La Linea station
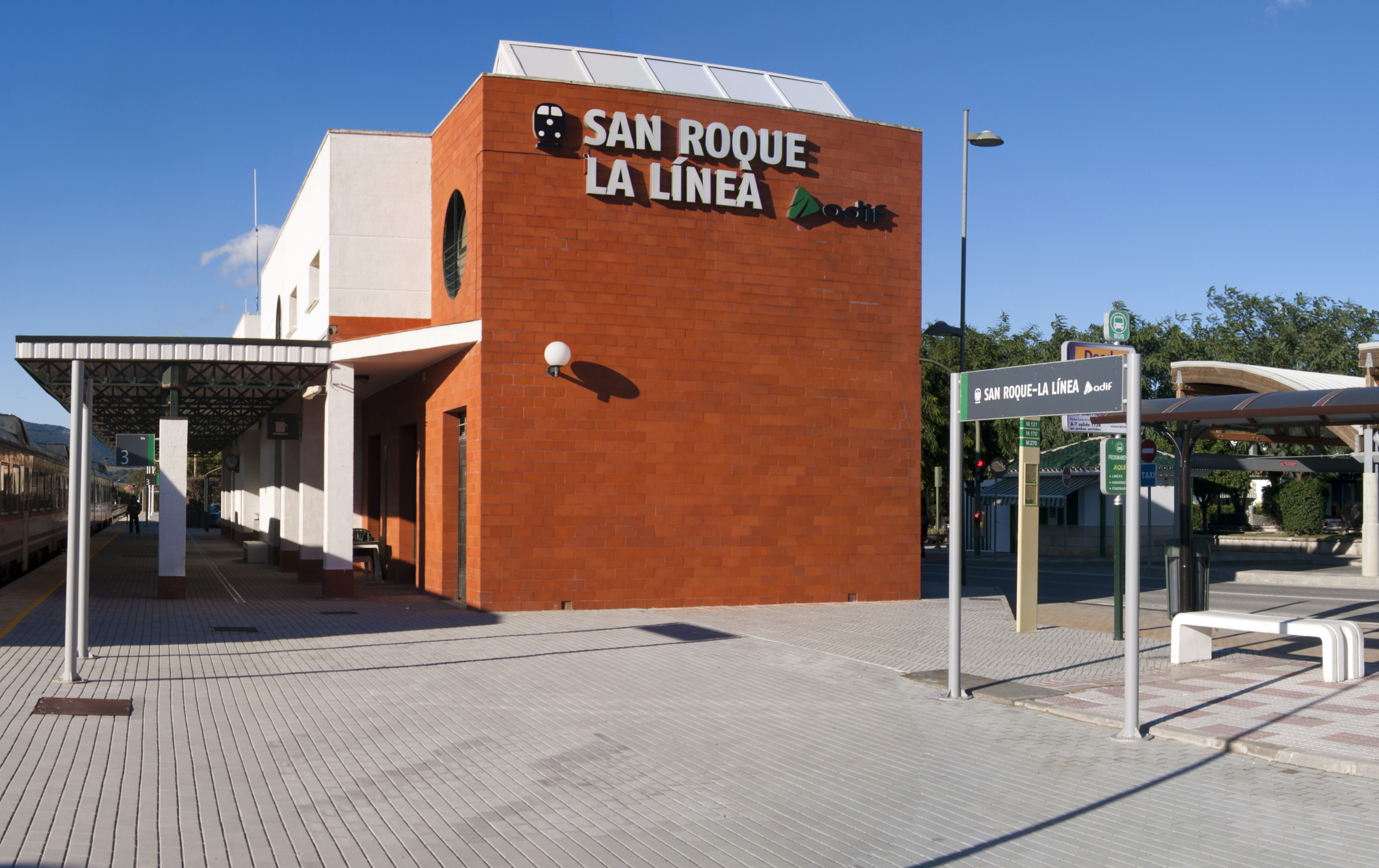

General information
- Location: San Roque, Andalusia; Spain
- Coordinates: 36°12′50″N 5°25′56″W
- System: Railway Station
- Owner: Adif
- Line: Algeciras-Bobadilla railway

History
- Opened: 1909

Passengers
- 2018: 60,386
Location

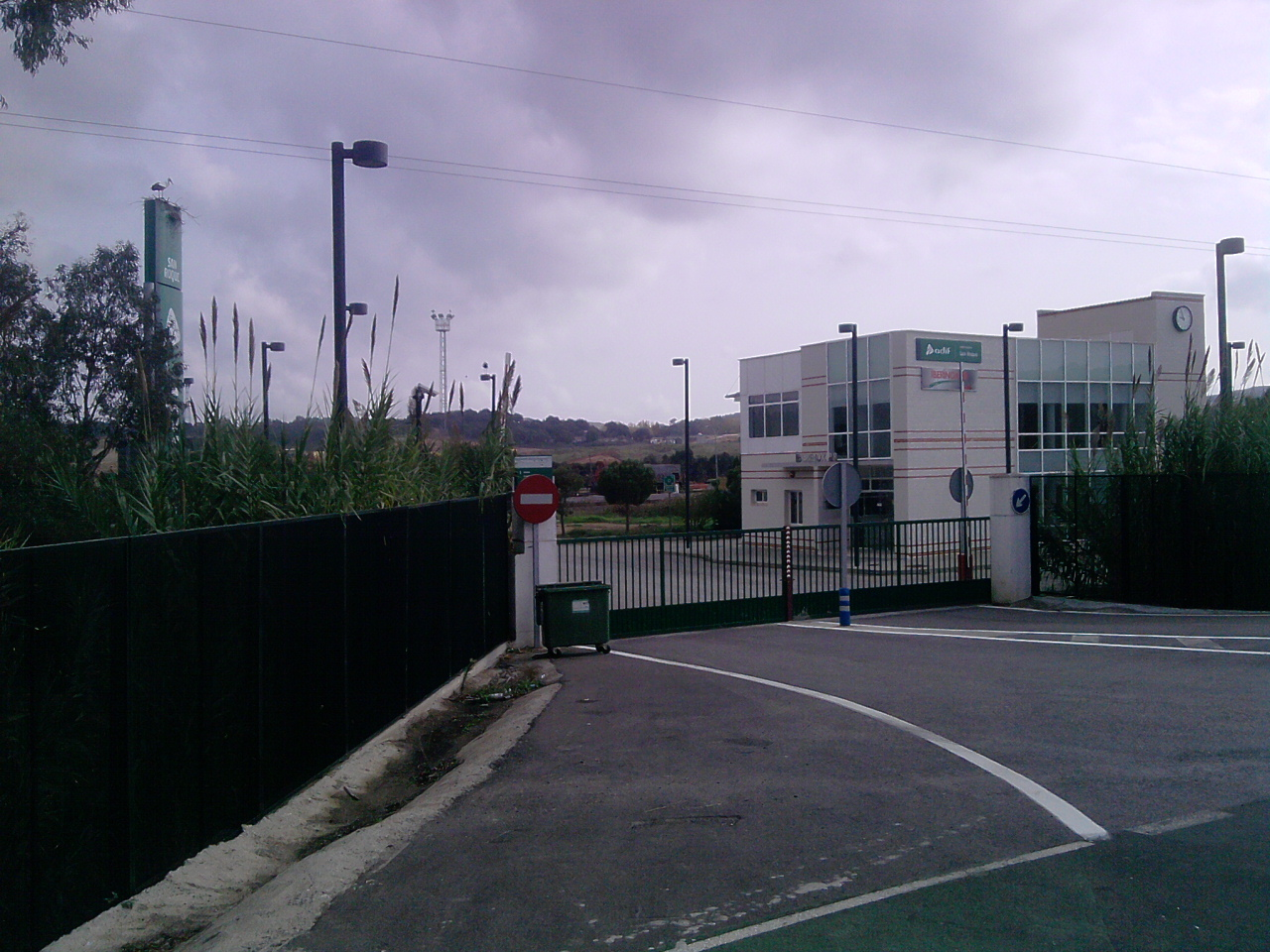
Logistics Centre (goods station) San Roque.

San Roque station (called in the railway system San Roque-La Línea, due to the proximity of La Línea de la Concepción) is located in a neighbourhood belonging to the municipality of San Roque in the Cadiz province. The population of the neighbourhood is 2,582 inhabitants and it is situated between the river and the Guadarranque mountain. This neighbourhood is bordered by Taraguilla.

The neighbourhood was founded in 1909, the date on which they built the railway station and surrounding neighbourhoods were established mainly from the nearby Ronda mountains leading to the neighbourhood.

== Adif Station ==
The importance of this neighborhood is that it is located ADIF railway station in the municipality of San Roque, which also provides service to La Linea de la Concepcion and Gibraltar, about 125,000 people in total. This station was opened in 1909 on the Algeciras-Bobadilla railway line and is an early stop on the Algeciras-Granada Renfe service with three trains a day.

Preceding station	Renfe Operadora	Following station
Ronda towards Madrid Puerta de Atocha	Intercity	Algeciras Terminus
Almoraima towards Granada	Media Distancia	Los Barrios towards Algeciras

This station is being redesigned to allow greater accessibility to the disabled.

== Communications ==
The San Roque station is included in the fare system of the Metropolitan Transport Consortium of Campo de Gibraltar. It belongs to the AB zone (Central Bay Arc).

Bus routes stopping at the station San Roque
Line	Way	Office
M-121	Los Barrios - La Linea	Comes
M-170	San Pablo - Jimena - Castellar - Algeciras	Comes
M-270	San Pablo - Jimena - Castellar - La Linea	Comes
City Buses
1	San Roque City Centre - Rail Station	Esteban

== Freight ==
A few miles north is the freight station of San Roque, one of the 19 stations of this kind in Spain, Adif maintained and operated by Renfe. The logistics terminal is the second busiest in Andalusia, Seville, just behind-the Bold. It is accessible from the A-405.
