= Los Cortijillos =

- Barriada (pedanía)
- Location in the Province of Cádiz Los Cortijillos (Spain)
- Coordinates: 36°11′15″N 5°26′15″W
- Country: Spain
- Autonomous community: Andalusia
- Province: Cádiz
- Comarca: Campo de Gibraltar
- Municipality: Los Barrios
- Judicial district: Algeciras

Population (2009)
  - Total: 2,636
- Time zone: UTC+1 (CET)
  - Summer (DST): UTC+2 (CEST)
- Postal code: 11370, Railway station: 11379
- Dialing code: (+34) 956
- Official language(s): Spanish

Los Cortijillos is a village and district of the Spanish municipality of Los Barrios of the Province of Cádiz, Andalucia, Spain. It is located six kilometres east of the main town of the municipality, just south of Guadacorte, between Gibraltar and Algeciras. As of 2009 had a population of 2,636 inhabitants. There is an industrial park and marshes in the area.
