= UD Los Barrios =

Association football club in Spain

- Full name: Unión Deportiva Los Barrios
- Nickname: Steelers
- Founded: 1993
- Ground: San Rafael; Los Barrios, Spain
- Capacity: 2,500
- Owner: Reygadas Sports Group
- Chairman: José Alfredo Reygadas
- Manager: Jorge Moreno
- League: División de Honor – Group 1
- 2024–25: División de Honor – Group 1, 6th of 16
Home colours	Away colours

Unión Deportiva Los Barrios is a Spanish football team based in Los Barrios, Province of Cádiz, in the autonomous community of Andalusia. Founded in 1993, it plays in División de Honor – Group 1. The team holds home games at Estadio San Rafael, with a 2,500-seat capacity.

In December 2017, Los Barrios was taken over by Heritage Sports Holdings, a group owned by Paul Collado, Pablo Dana and former Real Madrid defender Michel Salgado. The takeover also includes a link with Gibraltar United of the Gibraltar Premier Division, a club which is also owned by Heritage Sports Holdings.

== Season to season ==
Season	Tier	Division	Place	Copa del Rey
1993–94	5	Reg. Pref.	6th	
1994–95	5	Reg. Pref.	7th	
1995–96	5	Reg. Pref.	5th	
1996–97	5	Reg. Pref.	7th	
1997–98	5	Reg. Pref.	1st	
1998–99	4	3ª	16th	
1999–2000	4	3ª	16th	
2000–01	4	3ª	16th	
2001–02	4	3ª	9th	
2002–03	4	3ª	17th	
2003–04	4	3ª	8th	
2004–05	4	3ª	2nd	
2005–06	4	3ª	10th	
2006–07	4	3ª	7th	
2007–08	4	3ª	9th	
2008–09	4	3ª	3rd	
2009–10	4	3ª	7th	
2010–11	3	3ª	20th	
2011–12	4	1ª And.	1st	
2012–13	3	3ª	15th	

Season	Tier	Division	Place	Copa del Rey
2013–14	5	1ª And.	2nd	
2014–15	4	3ª	14th	
2015–16	4	3ª	10th	
2016–17	4	3ª	12th	
2017–18	4	3ª	17th	
2018–19	4	3ª	7th	
2019–20	4	3ª	16th	
2020–21	4	3ª	4th / 5th	
2021–22	5	3ª RFEF	17th	
2022–23	6	Div. Hon.	8th	
2023–24	6	Div. Hon.	8th	
2024–25	6	Div. Hon.	6th	
2025–26	6	Div. Hon.		

- 22 seasons in Tercera División
- 1 season in Tercera División RFEF

== Notable players ==
- (Gibraltar) Liam Walker
- (Spain) Pirulo
