= Puente Mayorga =

- Barriada (pedanía)
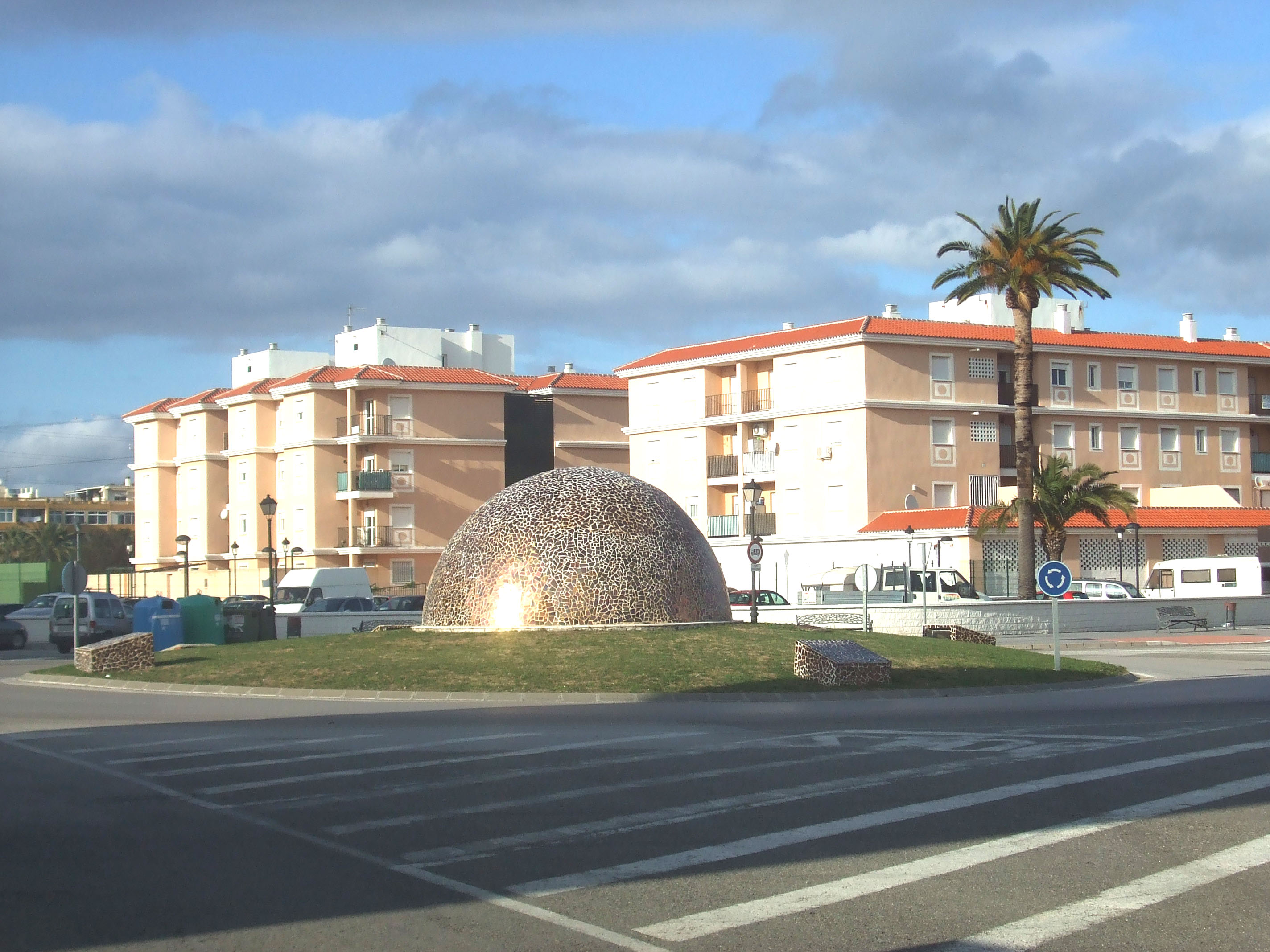

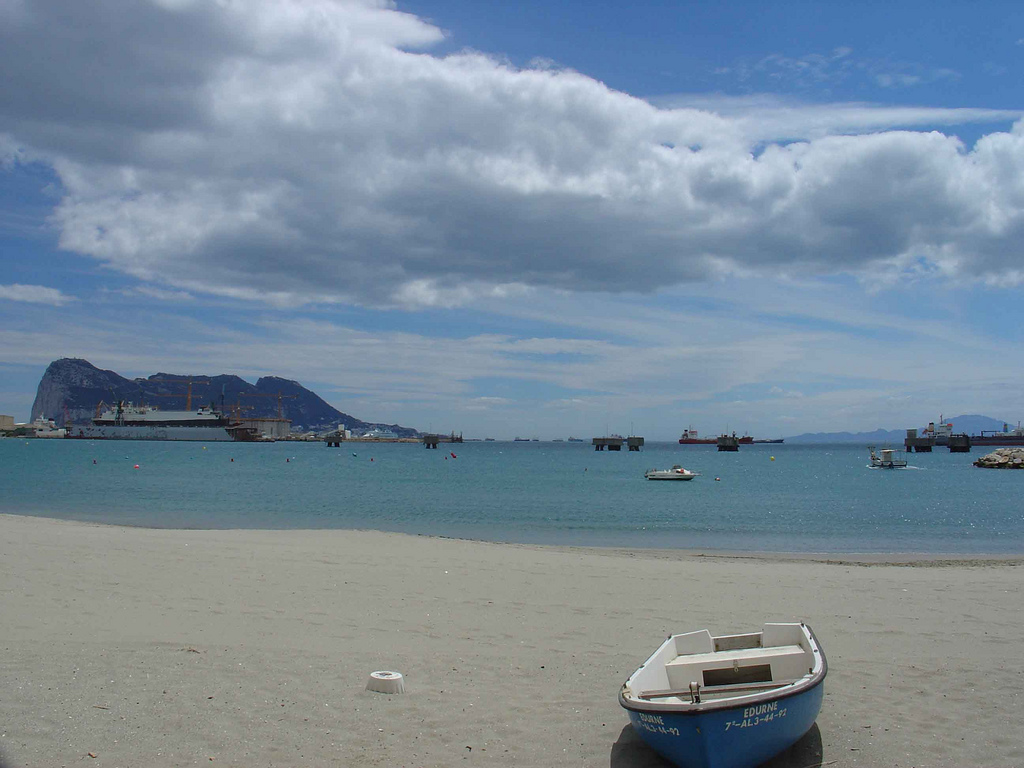
- View from Puente Mayorga across to Gibraltar

- Location in the Province of Cádiz Puente Mayorga (Spain)
- Coordinates: 36°10′51″N 5°23′11″W
- Country: Spain
- Autonomous community: Andalusia
- Province: Cádiz
- Comarca: Campo de Gibraltar
- Municipality: San Roque
- Judicial district: Algeciras

Population (2011)
  - Total: 2,245
- Time zone: UTC+1 (CET)
  - Summer (DST): UTC+2 (CEST)
- Postal code: 11370, Railway station: 11379
- Dialing code: (+34) 956
- Official language(s): Spanish

Puente Mayorga is a coastal village and district of the municipality of San Roque of the Province of Cádiz, Andalucia, Spain. Although it belongs administratively to San Roque, it is three kilometres south of the centre and is located on the Bay of Gibraltar, to the northwest of Gibraltar, and is effectively a northwestern suburb of La Línea de la Concepción. As of 2011 it had 2245 inhabitants. Of note is the Parish Church of San Hiscio and the Torre del Rocadillo, a historic tower situated about a 1-mile to the west.

This neighborhood is named after the bridge over the Arroyo de Cachón, a tributary of the Guadarranque which separates this village from a large industrial park across the river. Puente Mayorga lies along CA-34. The highway CA-2321 links with Guadarranque. A regular bus runs between Puente Mayorga and the towns of San Roque and La Línea de la Concepción.
