= José Cadalso =

Spanish soldier, author, poet, playwright and essayist (1741–1782)

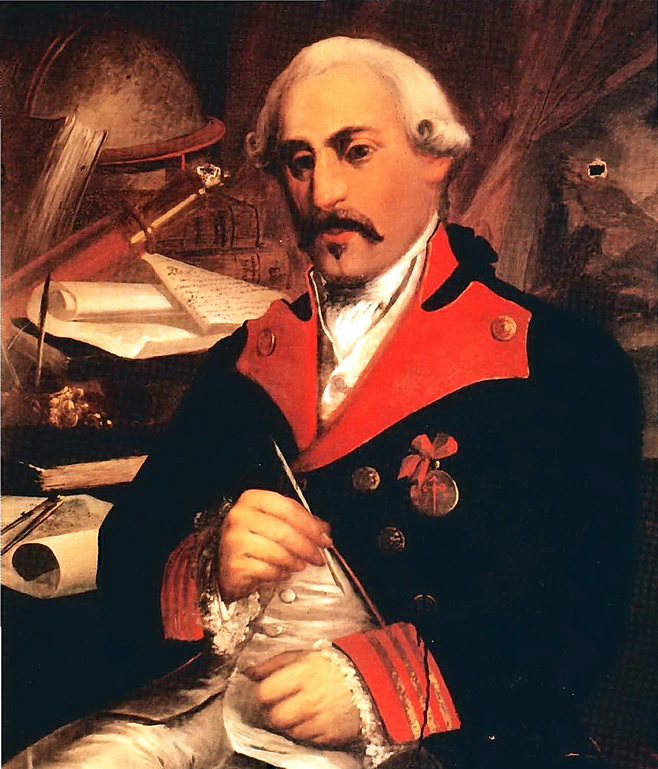
José Cadalso

José de Cadalso y Vázquez (Cádiz, 1741 – Gibraltar, 1782) was a Spanish soldier, novelist, poet, playwright and essayist. He was one of the major authors of Spanish Enlightenment literature.

== Career ==
Before completing his twentieth year, Cadalso had traveled through Italy, Germany, England, France and Portugal, and he had studied the history and literature of these countries. On his return to Spain he entered the army and rose to the rank of colonel.

Cadalso was the embodiment of the Enlightenment ideal of the "hombre de bien", a learned and well-rounded citizen whose multitude of interests could be utilized to improve society. He was a central figure in the literary landscape of eighteenth-century Spain, especially in the tertulia held at the Fonda de San Sebastián. He influenced a number of Spanish authors, not least among them a young and talented Juan Meléndez Valdés.

=== Works ===
His first published work was a verse tragedy, Don Sancho García, Conde de Castilla (1771). In 1772, he published his Los eruditos a la violeta (Wise men without learning), a commercially successful prose satire on the obsession with superficial knowledge and the appearance of erudition. In 1773 appeared a volume of miscellaneous poems, Ocios de mi juventud (Pastimes of my youth).

Cadalso is best known for his Cartas marruecas (Moroccan letters), an epistolary novel published posthumously by the Correo de Madrid newspaper from 1789 to 1790, and as a book in 1793. The Cartas marruecas have often been compared to Montesquieu's Lettres persanes (Persian letters, 1721), although in reality both works represented the period's fascination with epistolary narrative. Cartas marruecas and Noches lúgubres (Mournful nights) are often considered Cadalso's best works, although they are stylistically and thematically different.

Whereas Cartas marruecas is a rational, multi-perspectival examination of Spanish society through the eyes of a young Moroccan, Noches lúgubres is a short prose work centered on a mourning protagonist's desire to disinter his dead lover. It was inspired by the death of actress María Ignacia Ibáñez in Cadalso's arms in April 1771, when she was 26. This work, and a number of Cadalso's anguished lyrics, are considered antecedents of Romanticism in Spain, if not fully Romantic in their own right.

A three-volume edition of Cadalso's works appeared at Madrid in 1823. This was supplemented by the Obras inéditas (Paris, 1894) published by R. Foulch-Delbosc.

== Death ==
Cadalso was killed at the Great Siege of Gibraltar, on 27 February 1782, just 15 days after being promoted to colonel. He has a tomb in Saint Mary the Crowned Church in San Roque.
