= Juan Carlos Ruiz Boix =

Spanish politician (born 1974)

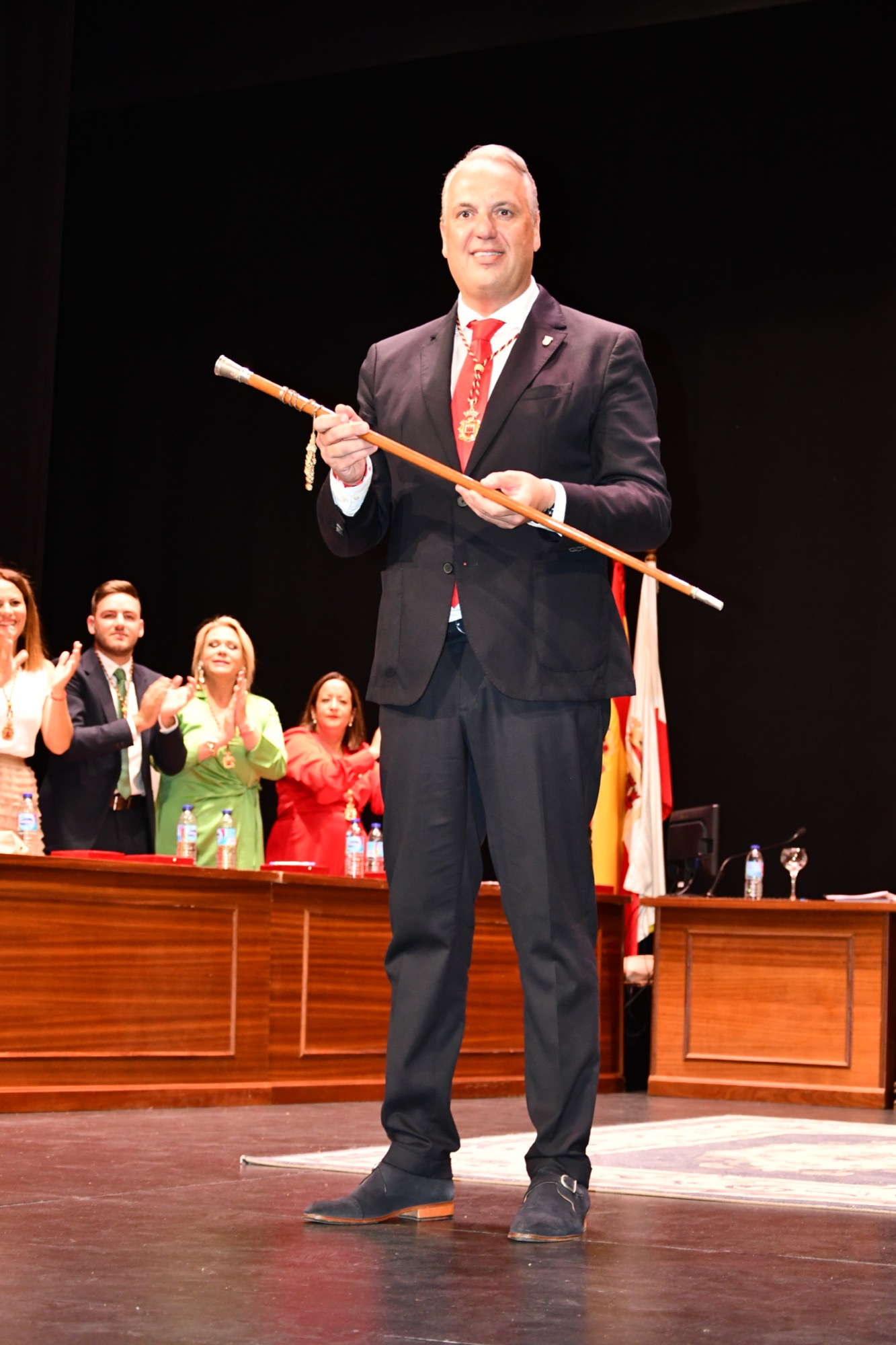
- Ruiz Boix in 2023

Member of the Congress of Deputies
- Incumbent
- Assumed office 17 August 2023
- Constituency: Cádiz

Personal details
- Born: 28 October 1974 (age 51)
- Party: Spanish Socialist Workers' Party

Juan Carlos Ruiz Boix (born 28 October 1974) is a Spanish politician serving as a member of the Congress of Deputies since 2023. He has served as mayor of San Roque since 2011.
