= Pinar del Rey (park) =

Public park in San Roque, Cádiz, Spain

- Location within Spain
- Type: Public park
- Location: San Roque, Cádiz
- Coordinates: 36°13′56″N 5°24′00″W
- Area: 338 hectares (840 acres)
- Created: 1800
- Status: Open year round

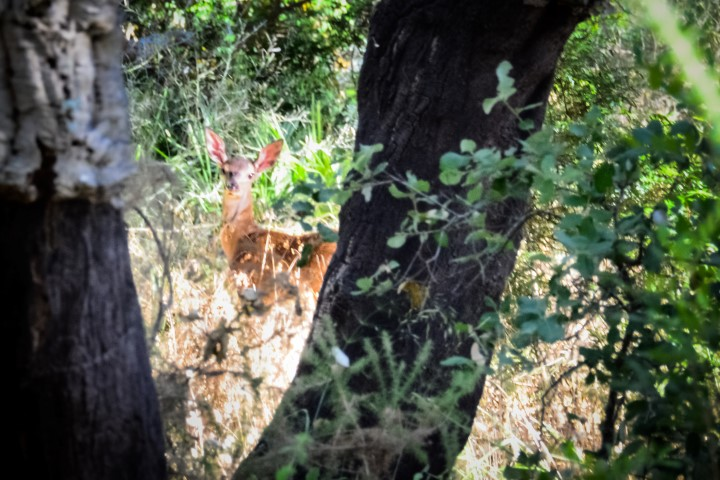
A wild deer. The previous week I disturbed a family of wild boar; unfortunately I didn't have my camera with me.

Pinar del Rey is a public park in San Roque, Cádiz in the south of Spain, with mainly pine trees. The Alhaja stream runs through the park.

== History ==
It was king Ferdinand IV of Castile who donated this area to the City of Gibraltar in 1310.

The forest dates back to 1800 when the Spanish Navy planted pine trees here to supply timber to build warships. The trees were never cut down as the combined Spanish and French fleet were defeated in the Battle of Trafalgar in 1805.
