= Campamento (San Roque) =

- Barriada (pedanía)
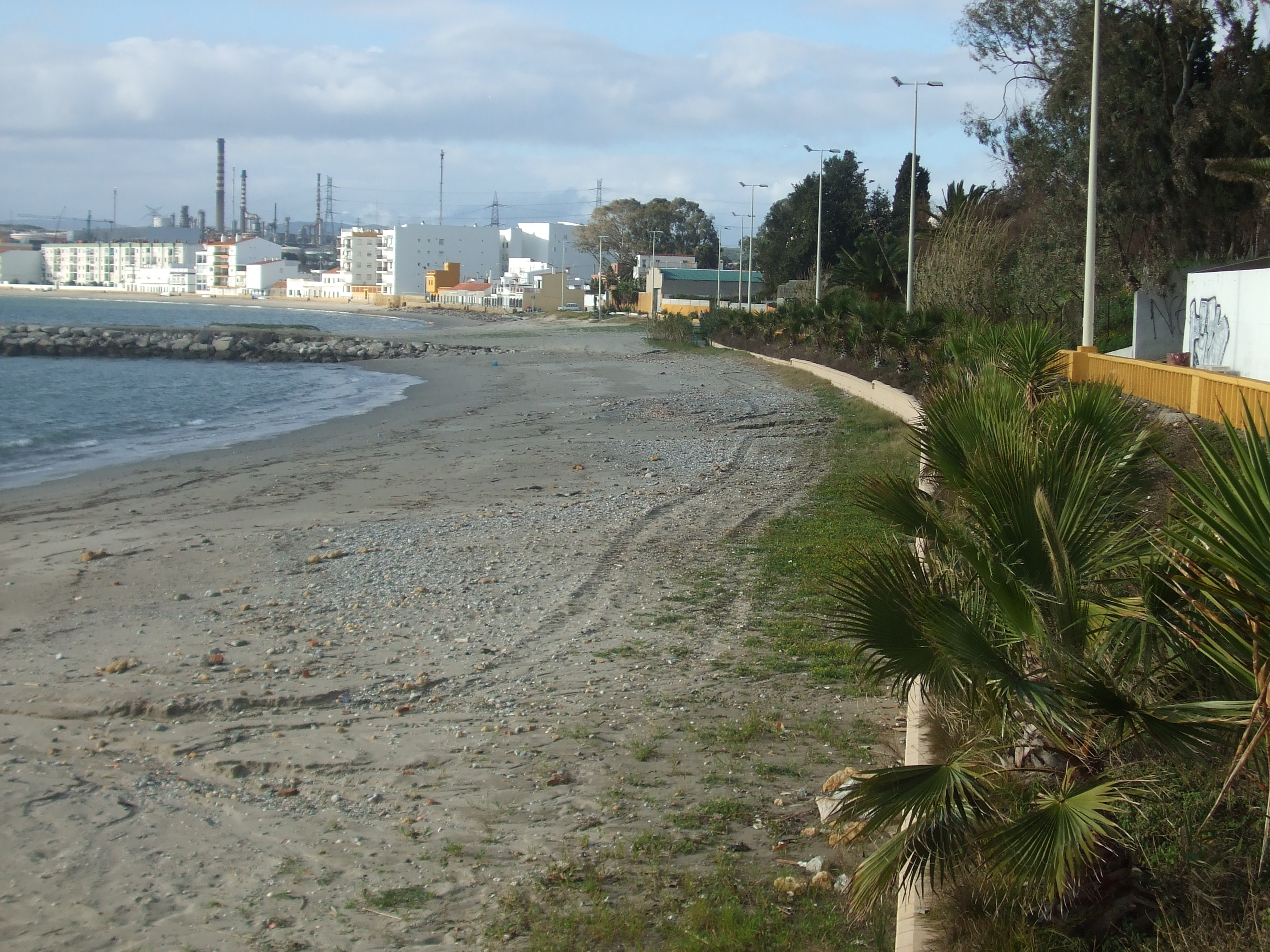
- Campamento Beach

- Location in the Province of Cádiz Campamento (Spain)
- Coordinates: 36°10′41″N 5°22′39″W
- Country: Spain
- Autonomous community: Andalusia
- Province: Cádiz
- Comarca: Campo de Gibraltar
- Municipality: San Roque
- Judicial district: Algeciras

Population (2011)
  - Total: 1,836
- Time zone: UTC+1 (CET)
  - Summer (DST): UTC+2 (CEST)
- Postal code: 11368
- Dialing code: (+34) 956
- Official language(s): Spanish

Campamento is a coastal village and district of the municipality of San Roque of the Province of Cádiz, Andalucia, Spain. Although it belongs administratively to San Roque, it is four kilometres south of the centre and is located on the Bay of Algeciras, to the northwest of Gibraltar, and is effectively a northwestern suburb of La Línea de la Concepción. As of 2011 it had 1836 inhabitants.

Campamento lies along the motorway Autovía CA-34. The highway CA-2321 links with Guadarranque. A regular bus runs between Campamento and the towns of San Roque and La Línea de la Concepción.

== History ==
This neighborhood is named after Spanish troops setting up camp during the Great Siege of Gibraltar. In the seventeenth century the cortijos of Benalife and Buena Vista were established.
