= Los Barrios =

- Municipality
- Villa de Los Barrios
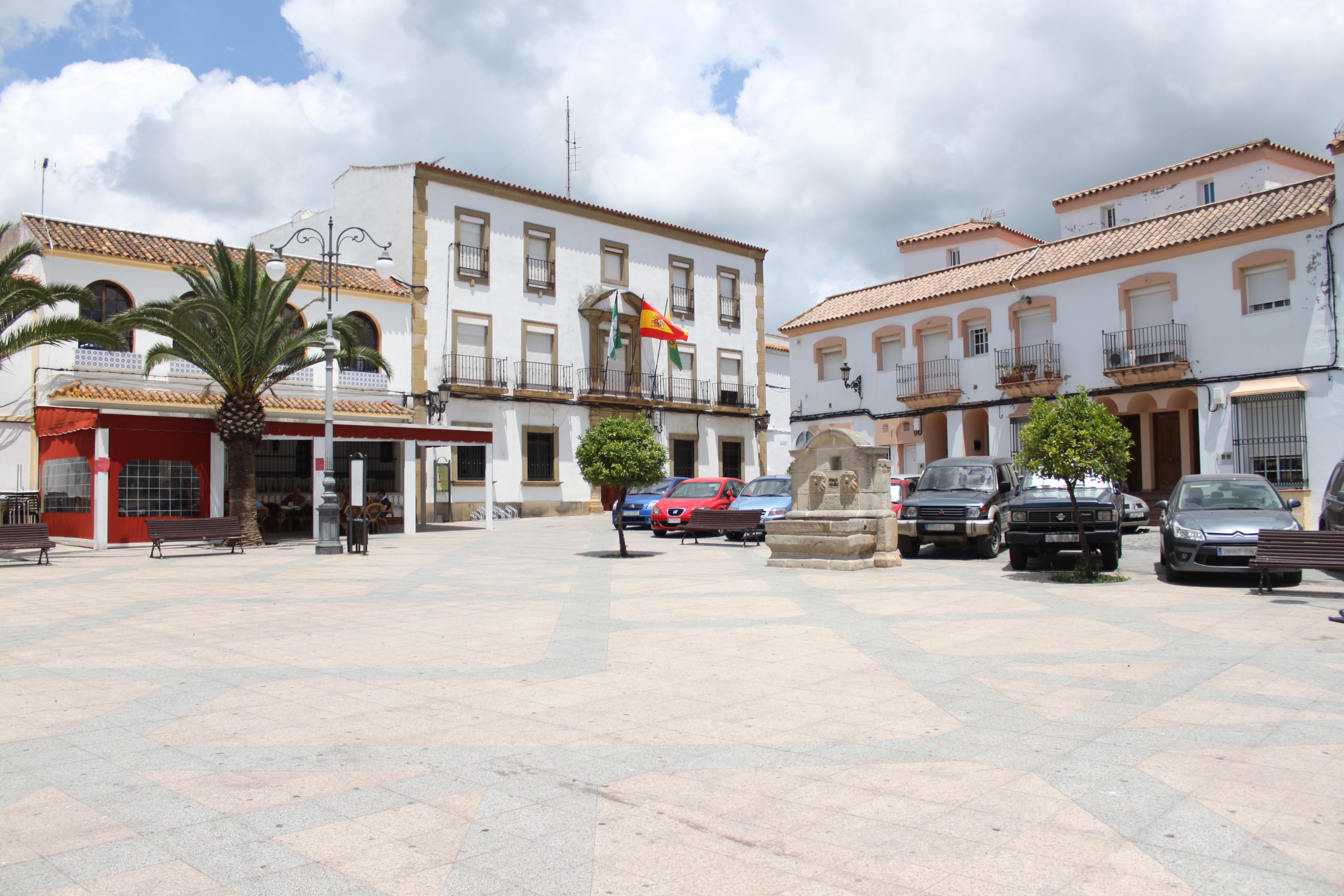

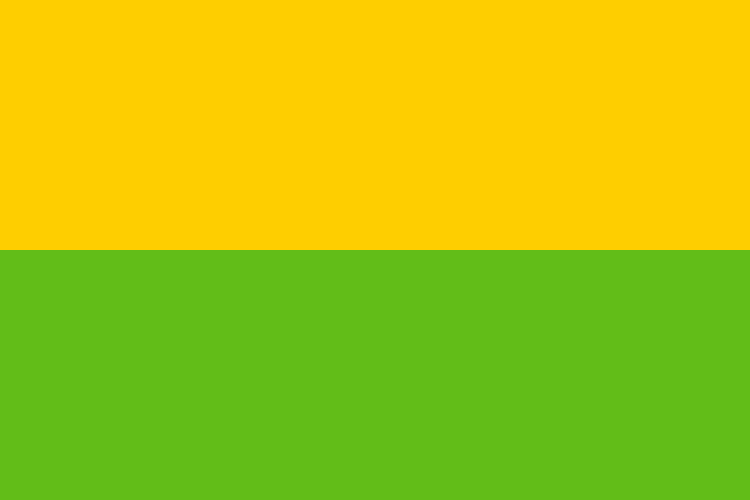
- Flag Coat of arms

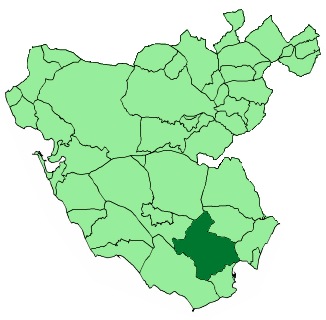
- Location of Los Barrios

- Location in Spain Los Barrios (Andalusia) Los Barrios (Spain)
- Coordinates: 36°11′N 5°29′W
- Country: Spain
- Autonomous community: Andalusia
- Province: Cádiz
- Comarca: Campo de Gibraltar
- Judicial district: Algeciras
- Founded: 1704

Government
  - Mayor: Miguel Fermín Alconchel (2019) (LB100X100)

Area
  - Total: 331.33 km^{2} (127.93 sq mi)
- Elevation: 23 m (75 ft)

Population (2025-01-01)
  - Total: 24,449
  - Density: 73.790/km^{2} (191.12/sq mi)
- Demonym(s): Barreños, Barriopeños
- Time zone: UTC+1 (CET)
  - Summer (DST): UTC+2 (CEST)
- Postal code: 11370, Railway station: 11379
- Dialing code: (+34) 956
- Website: Official website

Los Barrios is a small town and municipality in the south of Spain. It is part of the province of Cádiz, which in turn is part of the Andalusia region. It belongs to the Campo de Gibraltar comarca. The town's name means “the districts” or “the neighbourhoods” in English.

== History ==
Although the area is known to have been inhabited since prehistoric times, the town is of relatively recent provenance, having been founded in 1704 by refugees from Gibraltar. After abandoning their homes following Gibraltar's capture by Anglo-Dutch forces during the War of the Spanish Succession, some of the inhabitants of Gibraltar took refuge around the existing hermitage of San Isidro at the confluence of the rivers Guadarranque, Guadacorte and Cañas.

The temporary encampment eventually became a permanent settlement. In 1717 the settlers were ordered to concentrate themselves at Los Barrios and the neighbouring communities of Algeciras and San Roque (Cádiz). The three communities had a single administration at San Roque until undergoing a three-way split in 1756.

Los Barrios was principally an agricultural and fishing district until the Francisco Franco era; it is now heavily industrialised. The Autovía A-381 road starts here and it is known as the Route of the Bull as it travels past many bull farms. Guadacorte, Los Cortijillos and Palmones are settlements and districts of Los Barrios.

200 people are employed at the Los Barrios Power Plant.

== Notable people ==
- Iván Ruiz (born 1990), footballer

== See also ==
- List of municipalities in Cádiz
