= Guadarranque =

River in Spain

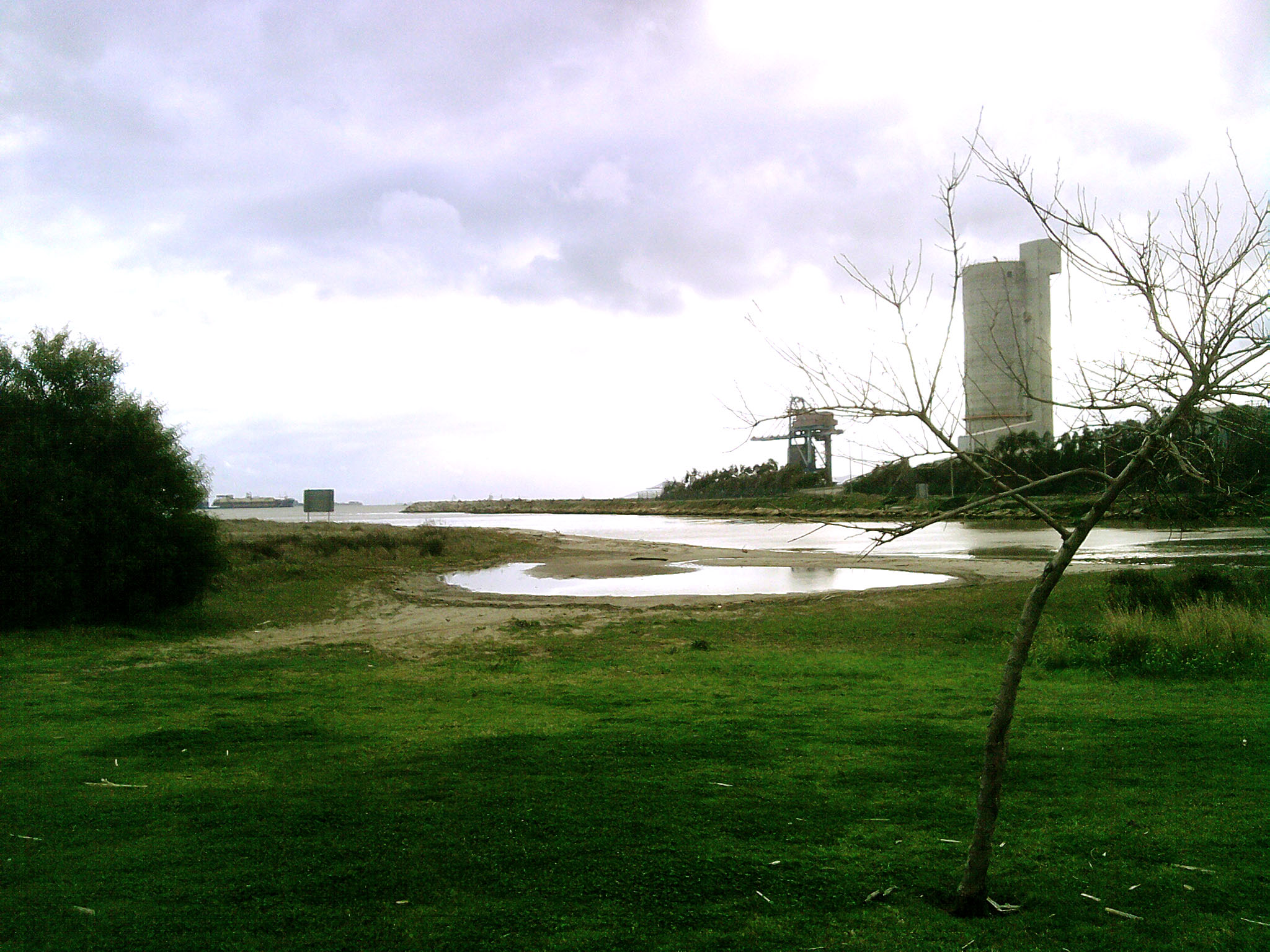
Guadarranque river

The Guadarranque (Spanish: Río Guadarranque) is a short coastal river of Spain in the Andalusian comarca of Campo de Gibraltar in the province of Cádiz. It is impounded to form the Embalse de Guadarranque. Its name is derived from the Arab Wadi Ramke or "river of mares". The Guadarrranque, 43 kilometres (27 mi) long, rises in the monte de Castellar, a short distance from the city of Castellar Viejo, and empties into the Bay of Algeciras.

The Guadarranque solar power plant (Spanish: Parque Solar Guadarranque) is a photovoltaic solar power plant in the Guadarranque industrial park, named after the river, in San Roque, Cádiz.

This river should not be confused with the other Guadarranque River in the Montes de Toledo.
