= San Roque, Spain =

San Roque
- Municipality
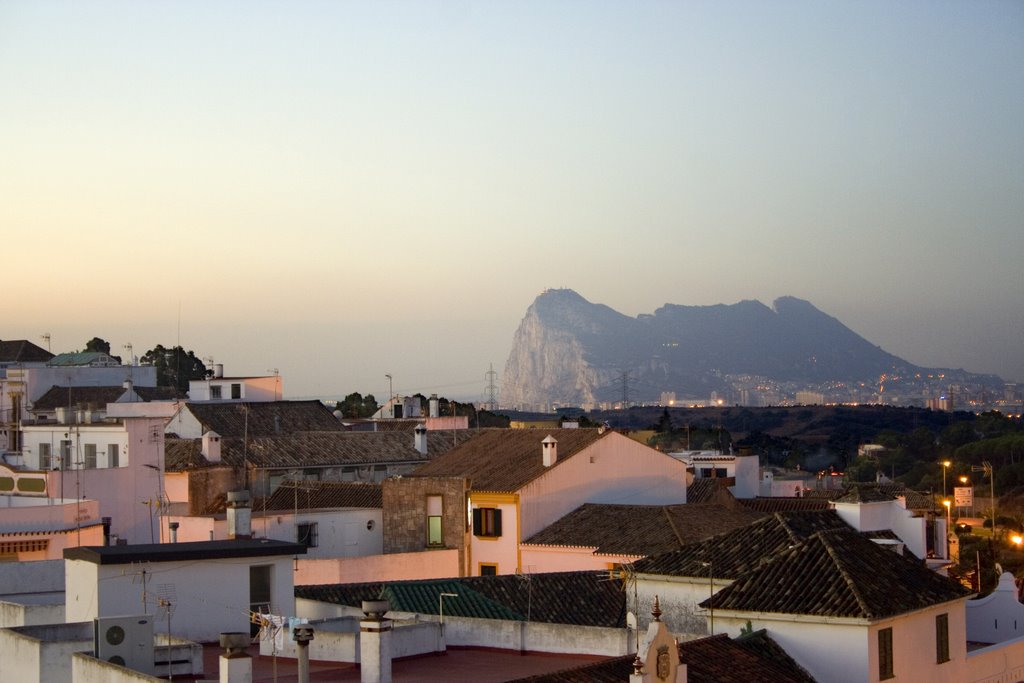
- View of San Roque at dusk showing The Rock in the background

- Flag Coat of arms
- Motto: "Muy Noble y Muy Leal ciudad de San Roque, donde reside la de Gibraltar" (Very Noble and Very Loyal city of San Roque, where Gibraltar lives on)
- Interactive map of San Roque
- Location in the Province of Cádiz San Roque (Andalusia)
- Coordinates: 36°12′35″N 5°23′4″W
- Country: Spain
- Autonomous community: Andalusia
- Province: Cádiz
- Founded: 21 May 1706

Government
  - Alcalde: Juan Carlos Ruiz Boix (PSOE)

Area
  - Total: 146.88 km^{2} (56.71 sq mi)
- Elevation: 108 m (354 ft)

Population (2025-01-01)
  - Total: 34,310
  - Density: 233.6/km^{2} (605.0/sq mi)
- Demonym: Sanroqueño/a
- Time zone: UTC+1 (CET)
  - Summer (DST): UTC+2 (CEST)
- Postal code: 11360, 11310, 11311, 11312, 11313, 11314, 11368, 11369
- Dialing code: (+34) 956 78 XX XX
- Official language(s): Spanish
- Website: www.sanroque.es

San Roque is a municipality of Spain belonging to the province of Cádiz, which in turn is part of the autonomous community of Andalusia. It is also part of the comarca of Campo de Gibraltar. Located in the southern end of the Iberian Peninsula, San Roque is a short way inland of the north side of the Bay of Gibraltar, to the north of the Gibraltar peninsula. The municipality has a total surface of 145 km^{2} with a population of approximately 25,500 people, as of 2005.

The foundation of San Roque as a city owes to the creation of a sort of Gibraltar-in-exile by refugees fleeing from the Rock in the wake of its seizure by Anglo-Dutch forces in 1704.

In addition of the main nucleus of San Roque, the municipality also includes settlements such as Puente Mayorga, Guadarranque, Sotogrande, Campamento, or Guadiaro.

== Placename ==
San Roque is Spanish for Saint Roch, a Christian saint who was revered in a shrine dating back to 1508 that predates the foundation of the town.

== Geography ==
San Roque lies in the comarca of Campo de Gibraltar, the south-eastern division of Cadiz province. It is bordered to the northwest by the municipalities of Jimena de la Frontera, Castellar de la Frontera, and Los Barrios, and to the south by La Línea de la Concepción, beyond which is Gibraltar itself.

== History ==
=== Precedents ===
The area around San Roque has been inhabited since prehistoric times. The oldest known settlement within the municipality is the ruined town of Carteia, founded by the Phoenicians. It became a Phoenician tradepost and evolved into a Carthaginian town by 228 BCE. Its major trade was in local wine and garum or salazón, a fish-based sauce.

Carteia was captured by Rome in 206 BCE. A few years later, in 171 BCE, Iberian-born children of Roman soldiers appeared before the Roman Senate to request a town to live in, and were given Carteia, named Colonia Libertinorum Carteia.

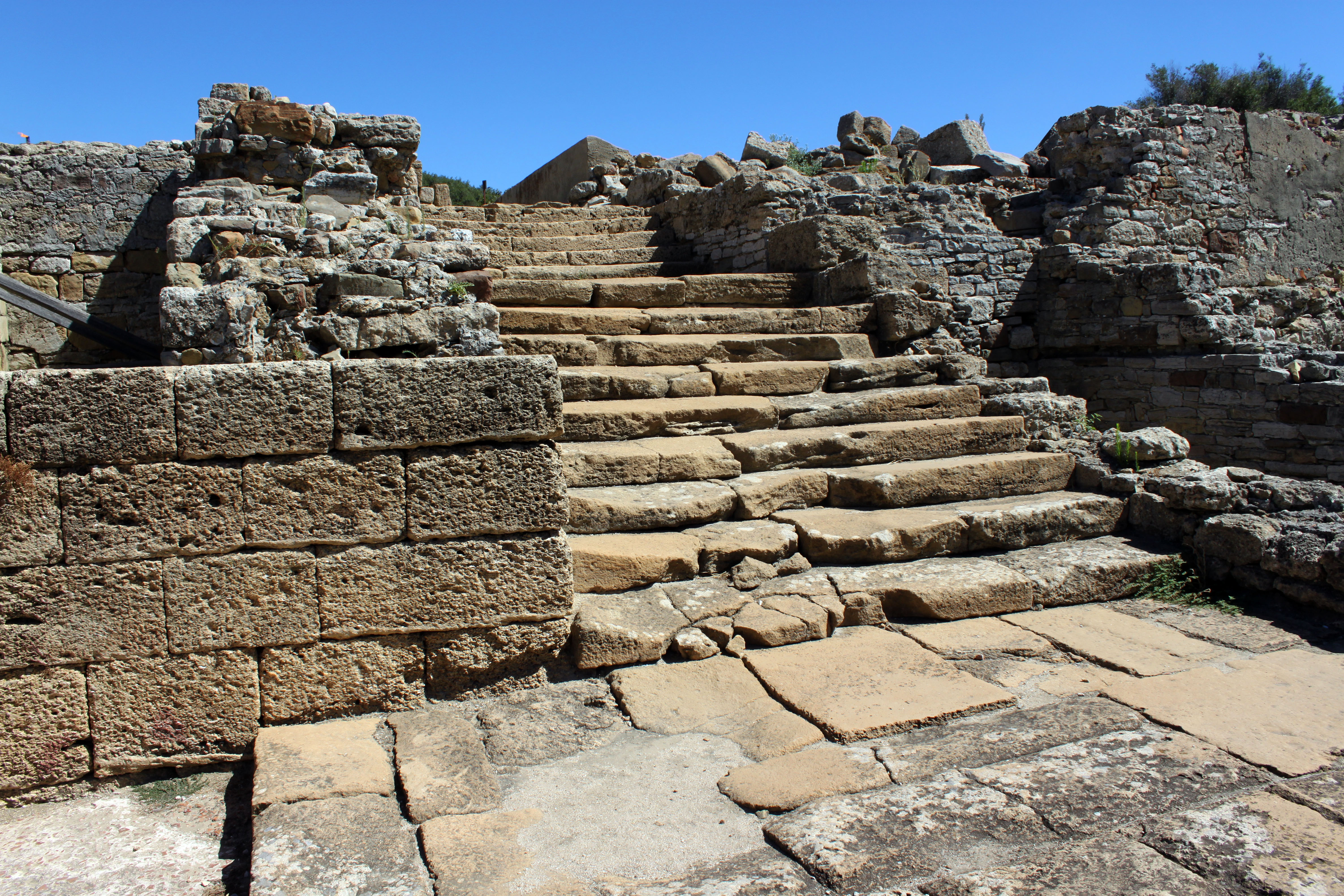
Roman forum, Carteia

After the fall of Rome, the Vandals briefly established themselves in the area until 428 before they embarked on the conquest of North Africa, via an invasion fleet across the Strait of Gibraltar. The Visigoths replaced them around the 6th century. The Byzantine Empire made incursions into Andalusia between 554 and 626, occupying Carteia for a number of years, before finally being ejected by the Visigoths.

In 711, Carteia and the surrounding area became the beachhead for the Umayyad conquest of the Iberian Peninsula led by Tariq ibn Ziyad. Alfonso XI of Castile took control of the territory by defeating a Muslim Merinid army in the 14th century. Over the next few centuries, the population was gradually Hispanicised and Christianised.

In 1649 a quarter of the Gibraltar population perished from epidemic disease. A number of residents retreated to the area of San Roque, and survived the outbreak, believed to be typhoid.

=== Foundation ===
The modern settlement of San Roque was established by the former Spanish inhabitants of Gibraltar, after the majority fled following the takeover by Anglo-Dutch forces and their Spanish allies during the War of the Spanish Succession in 1704. The establishment became a new town in 1706, addressed by King Philip V of Spain as "My city of Gibraltar resident in its Campo" and "My well beloved", because it remained loyal to his cause during the War of Succession. Gibraltar's City Council, banner and records were moved there. San Roque official motto is "Very Noble and Very Loyal city of San Roque, where Gibraltar lives on" (Spanish: Muy Noble y Muy Leal ciudad de San Roque, donde reside la de Gibraltar).

In 1873, during the Spanish First Republic, the town declared its independence as the Canton of San Roque for a few months.

== Main sights ==
Historical population
Year	Pop.	±%
1999	22,719	—
2000	22,990	+1.2%
2001	23,570	+2.5%
2002	23,981	+1.7%
2003	25,163	+4.9%
2004	24,757	−1.6%
2005	25,548	+3.2%
Source: INE (Spain)

The New Saint Roch's Chapel (Sp.: Ermita de San Roque) was erected in 1801. Its style is neoclassical. The shrine houses a statue of Saint Roch. In the fourth week of April every year, a procession is held on the saint's honour, with people carrying his image on a float. The statue is then taken from the temple to the Pinar del Rey pinewoods nearby and back. During the Spanish War of Independence, Saint Roch's Chapel was ransacked by the Napoleonic troops and the historic statue of the saint was destroyed. The image was replaced in 1833 by a new one donated by an army captain from San Roque called Juan Rojas, who was stationed in Seville. At the time this city was suffering from cholera epidemics, so Captain Rojas vowed to make the effigy himself if he and his family recovered from the disease. This happened indeed and the new image of Saint Roch was donated to the church by Rojas.

The parish church, Santa María La Coronada Church, is consecrated to Saint Mary the Crowned and it was declared a listed building in 1974. The main building dates from the 18th century and features Spanish-Tuscan architecture and Baroque artwork. Work began in 1735 on the construction of a church over the foundations of the 1508 Chapel of Saint Roch.

The Governor's Palace (Spanish: Palacio de los Gobernadores), which houses the municipal art gallery "Luis Ortega Bru", is also located in the same square.

The oldest bar in the town is the Bar Torres, adjacent to the central square.

Mathew Arnold's brother is buried in San Roque.

== Economy and industry ==
The main economic activities are tourism and manufacturing.

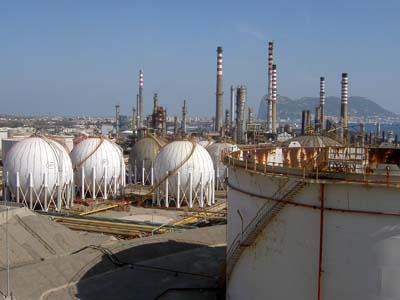
The CEPSA Gibraltar-San Roque Refinery

CEPSA Gibraltar-San Roque Refinery, built in 1967, is situated in Guadarranque Industrial Estate. It is the largest in the Iberian Peninsula, with a crude oil daily processing capacity of 240,000 barrels per day.

Local San Roque Club is an important source of tourism. Sotogrande is an exclusive beach and golf resort located in the municipality.

The beaches of Campamento and Puente Mayorga, although no longer so popular as in the sixties due to the nearby industrial activity, are close to San Roque town, facing the Bay of Gibraltar.

== Fairs ==
The Feria Real de San Roque (Royal Fair of San Roque in English), is the city's main yearly Street fair, held on the second Tuesday of August. The fair begins with the coronation ceremony of the juvenile and child queens and their respective courts, although the stands and attractions located in the Fairground El Ejido do not open until Wednesday, the day of the inaugural cavalcade. The Royal Fair closes on a Sunday night with a fireworks show and at 7am on the Monday with the Running of the Bulls known locally as Toro del Aguardiente which has occurred yearly since 1649, named as terrified participants are given a shot of the strong alcoholic spirit ‘Aguardiente’ for courage, before running with the bulls to the San Roque bullring, marking the end of the fair.

== Notable residents ==
- Carlos Pacheco (comic book artist)

== Sister cities ==
- Pylaia, Thessaloniki, Greece

== See also ==
- Algeciras
- San Roque station
- List of municipalities in Cádiz
