= Algeciras Bay metropolitan area =

Algeciras Bay Metropolitan Area
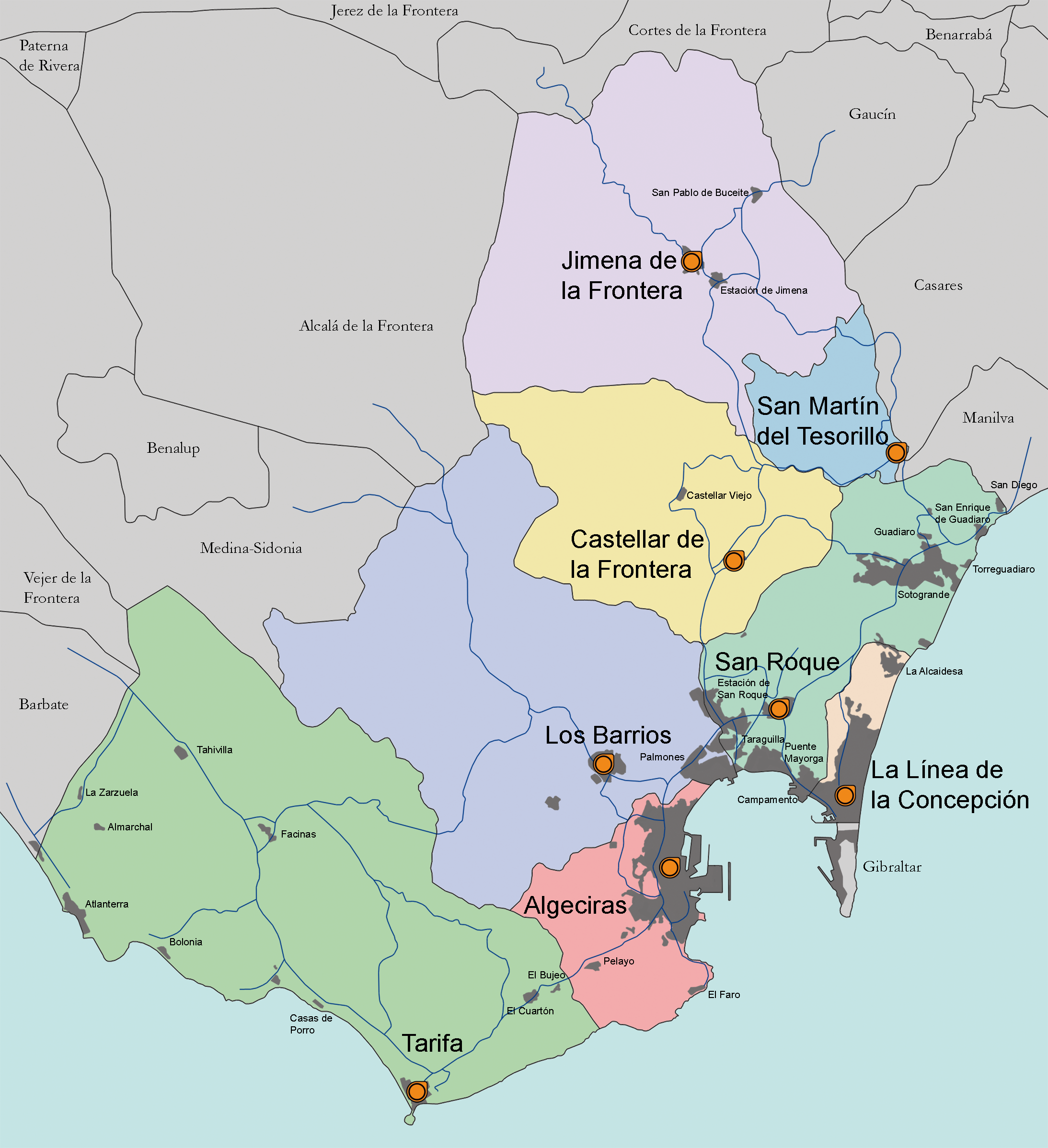
- Autonomous community: Andalusia
- Province: Cádiz

Area
  - Total: 1,527.65 km^{2} (589.83 sq mi)

Population (2023)
  - Total: 273,593
  - Density: 179.09/km^{2} (463.8/sq mi)
- Largest city: Algeciras (123,639 inhabitants)
- Subdivision: 8 municipalities

The metropolitan area of the Bay of Algeciras is one of the nine Andalusian metropolitan areas identified in the Andalusian Territorial Planning Plan, which encompasses the seven municipalities concentrated around Campo de Gibraltar, located in the extreme south of the Iberian Peninsula and that they add a population of almost 275,000 inhabitants.

== Urban area ==
The urban area includes urbanized and almost contiguous nuclei, for residential or industrial use, which are on the coast of the bay of Algeciras and its immediate surroundings. They would be the municipalities of Algeciras, Los Barrios, San Roque (except the Guadiaro Valley district) and La Línea. Although it is outside the definition of the Junta de Andalucía, as it is outside its jurisdiction, the population of the British Overseas Territory of Gibraltar, located next to La Línea, is also part of the urban continuum.

The metropolitan area contains the urban area, adding the rest of the region. Approximately 90% of the population of the metropolitan area lives in the urban area. On the outskirts of the Bay of Algeciras we find, in a first level of distance, a series of population centers between ten and twenty kilometers from it, including Tarifa, Castellar de la Frontera, San Martín del Tesorillo, the Guadiaro Valley and the Secadero neighborhood belonging to the Malaga municipality of Casares. A second group of rural population centers appears over twenty kilometers from the Bay, highlighting Jimena de la Frontera and the towns of Facinas and Tahivilla, belonging to the municipality of Tarifa.

Other definitions for this urban agglomeration also include Gibraltar and even Ceuta, since these two cities, mainly Gibraltar, directly influence the economy and society of the area. Sometimes it is also called the Campo de Gibraltar metropolitan area. Therefore, if we included these two populations, the area would contain around 375,546 inhabitants, being one of the most many in Andalusia.

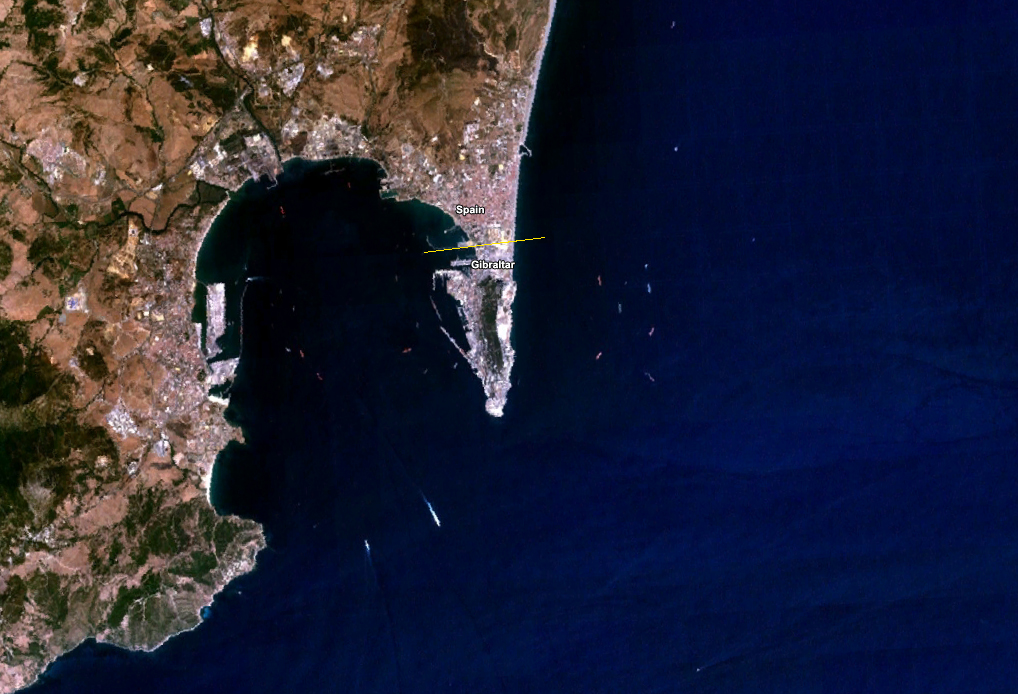
View of the Bay of Algeciras from satellite.

Municipality	Population (2017)	Population (2023)	Area
Algeciras	121,133	123,639	86.00 km²
Los Barrios	23,374	24,219	331.33 km²
Castellar de la Frontera	3,022	3,020	178.84 km²
Jimena de la Frontera	9,685	6,675	345.66 km²
La Línea de la Concepción	63,146	63,773	19.27 km²
San Roque	29,969	33,646	146.88 km²
Tarifa	18,088	18,621	419.67 km²
Total	268,417	275,516	1,527.65 km²

== See also ==
- Campo de Gibraltar Metropolitan Transport Consortium
- Demography of Andalusia
- Gibraltar Field
- Annex: Metropolitan areas of Andalusia
