= El Zabal =

- Barriada (pedanía)
- Location in the Province of Cádiz El Zabal (Spain)
- Coordinates: 36°11′4″N 5°21′9″W
- Country: Spain
- Autonomous community: Andalusia
- Province: Cádiz
- Comarca: Campo de Gibraltar
- Municipality: La Línea de la Concepción
- Judicial district: Algeciras
- Time zone: UTC+1 (CET)
  - Summer (DST): UTC+2 (CEST)
- Official language(s): Spanish

El Zabal is an industrial village and northern suburb of La Línea de la Concepción in the Province of Cádiz, Andalucia, Spain. It lies along the A-353 road. Several companies including Industria Metalica Luis Guitierrez, Guillermo Leiva SI, and Vimar La Linea SL have factories here and historically it was an area of orchards. The VII Marcha Internacional No Violenta had their headquarters in Casatuya in El Zabal.
