= Jorge Caballero =

Jorge Caballero may refer to:

- Jorge Caballero (guitarist) (born 1977), Peruvian guitarist who performed with Grisha Goryachev
- Jorge Caballero (actor) (born 1992), Mexican actor
- Jorge Caballero (painter) (1902-1992), Chilean painter
- Jorge Luis Caballero Torres (born 1994), Mexican football player
