= Pedro Valiente =

- Village
- Location in the Province of Cádiz Pedro Valiente (Spain)
- Coordinates: 36°02′19″N 5°37′19″W
- Country: Spain
- Autonomous community: Andalusia
- Province: Cádiz
- Comarca: Campo de Gibraltar
- Municipality: Tarifa
- Judicial district: Algeciras
- Time zone: UTC+1 (CET)
  - Summer (DST): UTC+2 (CEST)
- Official language(s): Spanish

Pedro Valiente is a small village in the municipality of Tarifa in the Province of Cadiz in southern Spain. It is located 4.5 kilometres (2.8 mi) by road to the northwest of Tarifa, across the Salado River. The Tarifa Kite School and Guzman House, a restaurant, are located here. There are also numerous apartments in the vicinity.
