= Castle of Castellar de la Frontera =

- Castillo de Castellar de la Frontera (Spanish)
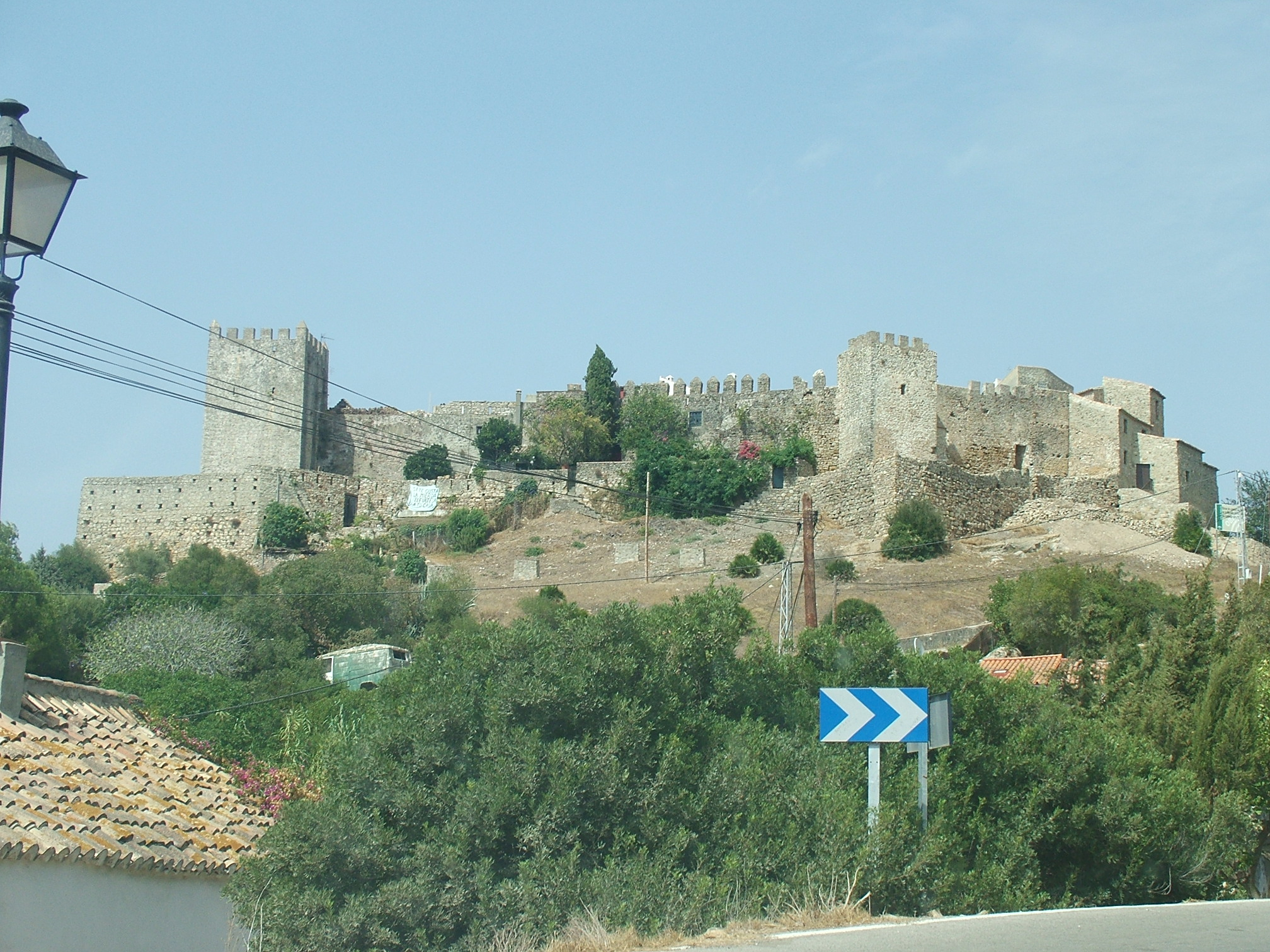
- The castle in 2005

- Location within Spain
- 36.31865°N 5.45327°W
- Location: Castellar de la Frontera, Cádiz, Andalusia, Spain

History
- Built: c. 13th century

Spanish Cultural Heritage
- Official name: Castillo de Castellar de la Frontera
- Type: Non-movable
- Criteria: Monument
- Designated: 1963
- Reference no.: RI-51-0001454

The Castle of Castellar de la Frontera (Spanish: Castillo de Castellar de la Frontera) is a castle located in Castellar de la Frontera, Spain. It was declared Bien de Interés Cultural in 1963.

The castle was listed as one of the 13 most impressive castles of Andalusia by the magazine National Geographic in 2022. Ana Cristina Ruiz of the Diario de Cádiz described the castle as one of the best-preserved in Europe. The castle was built around the 13th century. Just a few kilometers north of the Strait of Gibraltar, the castle had strategic maritime importance during the Reconquista.
