= Grisha Goryachev =

Russian classical guitarist (born 1977)

Grigory "Grisha" Goryachev (Russian: Гриша Горячев) (born 29 December 1977 in St. Petersburg) is a Russian virtuoso flamenco and classical guitarist now living in the United States. A master of both flamenco and classical guitar, he is one of the world's few guitarists to continue the traditions of solo flamenco in concert performances. He is heavily influenced by Paco de Lucía and Sabicas. Goryachev is technically a highly proficient player, testament to his background in classical guitar from a very young age.

== Biography ==
A native of St. Petersburg, Goryachev began to play the guitar at the age of six, taught by his father Dmitry, a master teacher and player of the classical guitar and learned quickly. He was a child prodigy, performing regularly in the top concert halls of St. Petersburg, Moscow, Minsk, Riga and other cities in the Soviet Union from the age of nine, receiving wide coverage in Soviet magazines and newspapers. His father was able to obtain copies of recordings of flamenco greats such as Juan Martín and Sabicas, attracting his interest from an early age. But exposure was limited; Goryachev has said, "I had very bad access to recordings. Most of what I used to pick up were pirates." Goryachev has said of his allurement to flamenco, "It was everything: the sound of the guitar, the rhythms. It's hard not to be moved by this music. It moves me so much that I want to cry." He performed as a child on Soviet radio and television and participated in the TV marathon, Revival of St. Petersburg, broadcast across the world. In 1986 he saw Paco de Lucía at a concert in Russia at the peak of his career which he says "blew his mind" and was "absolutely amazing"; it was a massive influence on him and a turning point in his life. From this point he concentrated on learning flamenco, helped by his father, transcribing many unpublished pieces completely by ear as he listened to recordings. He learned to play flamenco purely by listening to recordings of the masters, professing never to have learned from tablature in his life. His tremolo picking was initially poor, but on the advice of his father he practiced it slowly for two years, after which he was able to play proficiently. He was driven to play like his newfound hero, and would play along with the recordings, attempting to match the pace of de Lucia's picados. His initial study into flamenco covered the works of Juan Martín, and he performed these in concert while still a boy.

In 1991, Goryachev performed at UN headquarters in New York City and also toured Scandinavia where he performed for royalty. In 1993, he represented his native city in the Days of St. Petersburg at the Jerusalem Festival, and in 1994 he performed at an Andrés Segovia memorial concert at the Festival International de Colmar in Colmar, France. In 1997 he toured Spain and met and performed with his hero, flamenco master Paco de Lucía who aided him in applying for a visa to go to the United States. Goryachev said, "I met Paco when I was touring Spain and I played for him at his home. He said that I sounded very good, but if I wanted to play flamenco I had to move to Spain. I never managed to do that." His repertoire now also includes the music of other flamenco masters such as Vicente Amigo, Manolo Sanlucar and Rafael Riqueni.

In May 2005 he was awarded a special prize for the Best Performance of Spanish Music at the VI International Classical Guitar Competition in Almería, Spain, later performing at the Festival de Música Española de Cádiz and the Festival de Música de Jimena de la Frontera. He is a graduate of the New England Conservatory of Music in Boston, where he studied under Eliot Fisk. Both Fisk and Christopher Parkening have praised Goryachev's abilities.

Goryachev has recorded two albums of flamenco music: Alma Flamenca and Homenaje a Sabicas. Today, Goryachev is one of the world's few guitarists to continue the traditions of solo flamenco in concert performances. He has professed his desire to see more guitarists follow his example in playing traditional flamenco to keep the music alive and to encourage classical players to play flamenco compositions in their repertoire and accept it. However, the Boston Globe says that his "repertoire ranges from traditional flamenco to jazzier works by contemporary composers".

In May 2012 he performed Joaquín Rodrigo's popular Concierto de Aranjuez at the Melrose Memorial Hall in Boston. In October 2012 he performed with Peruvian guitarist Jorge Caballero at the 2012 Texas A&M International Guitar Symposium and Competition at Rudder Theatre.
