= Jimena de la Frontera =

- Municipality and Town
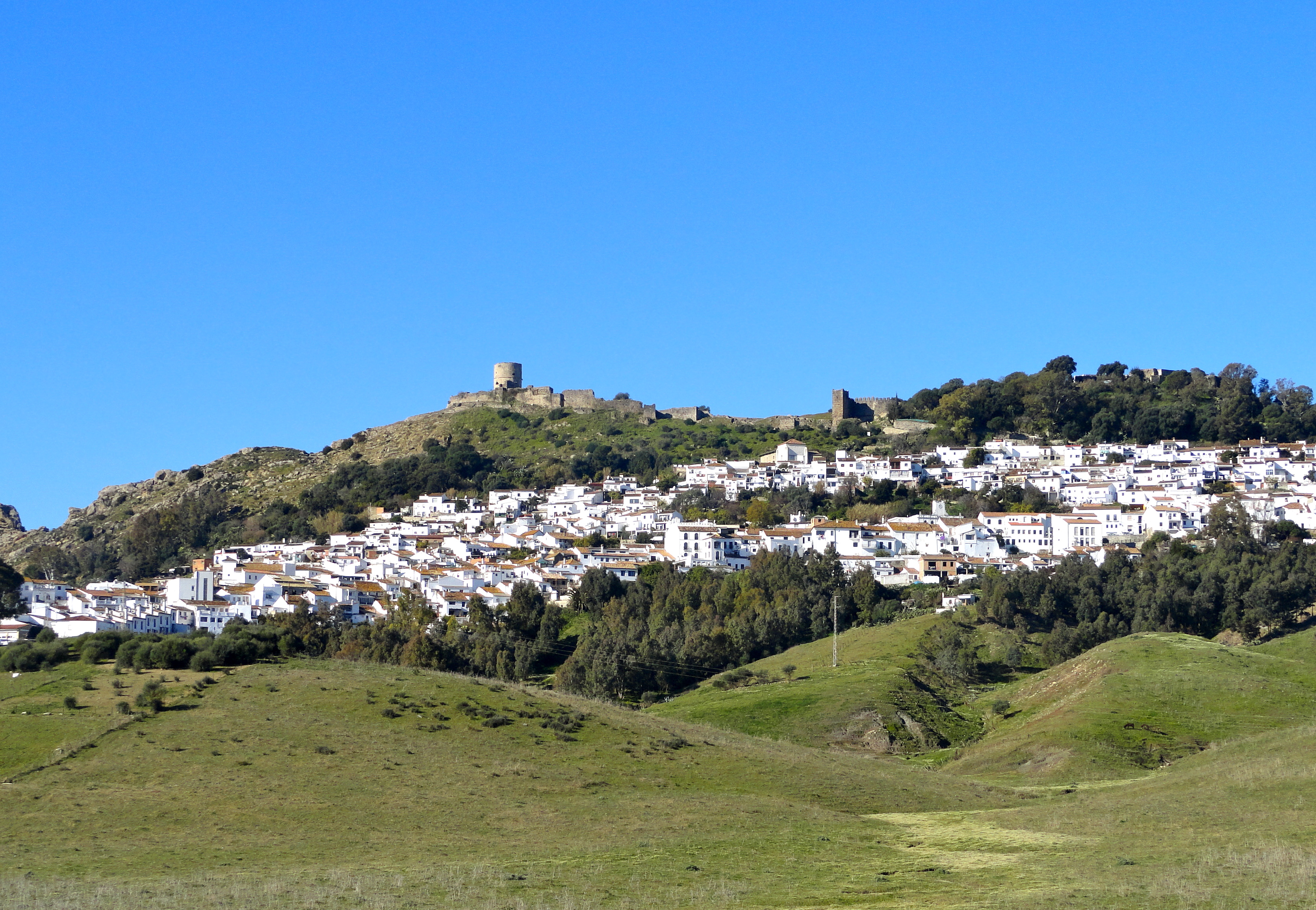
- View of Jimena from one of the fields surrounding it.

- Flag Coat of arms

- Location in the Province of Cádiz Jimena de la Frontera (Andalusia) Jimena de la Frontera (Spain)
- Coordinates: 36°26′N 5°27′W
- Country: Spain
- Autonomous community: Andalusia
- Province: Cádiz
- Comarca: Campo de Gibraltar
- Municipality: Jimena de la Frontera
- First settled: 8th century BCE

Government
  - Mayor: Francisco José Gómez Pérez (IU)

Area
  - Total: 345.66 km^{2} (133.46 sq mi)
- Elevation: 99 m (325 ft)

Population (2022)
  - Total: 6,681
  - Density: 19.33/km^{2} (50.06/sq mi)
- Demonym(s): Jimenato, ta
- Time zone: UTC+1 (CET)
  - Summer (DST): UTC+2 (CEST)
- Postal code: 11330; 11339 (Los Ángeles)
- Dialing code: (+34) 956
- Website: jimenadelafrontera.es

Jimena de la Frontera is a historic town and municipality located in the province of Cádiz, Spain. According to estimates made by the National Statistics Institute of Spain (INE), the municipality has a population of 6,707 inhabitants as of 2020. The municipality contains three major towns, Jimena de la Frontera, Los Ángeles and San Pablo de Buceite. Other towns include Montenegral Alto and Marchenilla.

It is situated in the eastern part of the province, on the A-405 (San Roque-Ronda) road. It is located near Málaga, practically being the border between the provinces of Málaga and Cádiz. Its location between the Serranía de Ronda and the Bay of Algeciras preserves one of the most important Mediterranean forest spots in southern Europe: the Alcornocales Natural Park. Almost two thirds of the municipality belong to the park.

== History ==
=== Origins ===
The existence of caves and natural shelters with abundant remains and cave paintings throughout the Campo de Gibraltar indicates the existence of human settlements that date back to the Palaeolithic. Jimena de la Frontera is no exception, with the paintings of Laja Alta, with unique maritime scenes from the Bronze Age in the Iberian Peninsula.

The ancient Phoenician city of Oba, known for its minting of coins in the Libyan-Phoenician alphabet, is usually identified with Jimena. In the castle, epigraphs have been found with the text: res publica Obensis. This name was used during Roman times. During this period, Jimena flourished as a commercial and strategic center. According to local tradition, the great-grandfather of Mark Antony was born here. The location of the town, sheltered by hills but reasonably close to the Strait of Gibraltar, meant that its strategic functionality was exploited by the different peoples that have populated it. Thus, after the fall of the Roman Empire, the site served as a defensive post over the Strait of Gibraltar for the Visigoths, who lost it to Byzantine hands in the 6th century.

The arrival of the Muslims in the 8th century did not alter this situation. The conquerors carried out a series of actions to reinforce the enclave, already called Xemina (from which the Christian name of Ximena and later Jimena would derive), building a new fortification. The town was in the hands of the Marinids, until 1319, when Ismail I gave it, along with other cities, to the Nasrid kingdom of Granada in exchange for help against Christian advances.

=== After the Reconquista ===
It remained at the frontier position of the Nasrid kingdom (hence its name of de la Frontera) until 1431, when it was conquered during the Reconquista by Pedro García de Herrera, Marshal of Castile, under the reign of Juan II of Castile, who took the town on March 11. Its border situation was not stable, since it made it change hands between Muslims and Christians during the 15th century on some occasions. In 1451 it returned to Nasrid power, until in 1456, Enrique IV conquered it definitively, handing it over to Beltrán de la Cueva, beginning the rebuilding and repopulation of the town during the last third of the 15th century. Finally in 1510 it went to the Casa de Medina Sidonia, sold by its previous lords, the Dukes of Alburquerque. A few years later, the troops formed in this city participated in the taking of Granada under the command of Rodrigo Ponce de León, for which the Catholic Monarchs gave the town the title of Loyalty in 1493, and later, in 1498, Royal Charter.

The end of the conflicts makes the town lose its military condition in favor of other more productive activities such as agriculture, especially cereal and legumes, cattle ranching and the exploitation of forests, which report abundant amounts to the Duchy of Medina Sidonia. A consequence of the economic development is the growth of the population, which begins to settle outside the walled enclosure. In the seventeenth century, disputes began with the Duke of Medina Sidonia to obtain freedom from the manorial system, although without any result.

The loss of Gibraltar in the 18th century once again transformed Jimena into a military enclave, this time in a fight with the English. Felipe V granted him in 1717 the dictate of Faithful for his attitude during the War of the Spanish Succession. At the end of the century the second blast furnace began to be built, along the banks of the Hozgarganta River, which supplied the warlike needs of the area. The company was maintained as long as these circumstances persisted, but the high costs and the site of Gibraltar ended its existence.

=== Modern history ===
The Spanish War of Independence has Jimena as the scene of battles, with disastrous consequences, human losses and local historical heritage (such as the loss of municipal archives during the French invasion).

After this conflict, the 19th century passed between shocks, such as Riego's pronouncement in 1820, carried out in Jimena by the "Prince" Battalion, one of the first to rise up and based in the town. Apart from this, two events determined the development of the town: the decree of suppression of the manors in 1837, which led to the independence of the ducal power and the appointment of the city by King Alfonso XII of Spain in 1879.

The initial consideration of San Pablo de Buceite and San Martín del Tesorillo as towns must be specifically sought in 1869, when the estates of Buceite and Montenegral Bajo were sold, where these population centers were integrated, by the Duke of Medina Sidonia to the Marquis of Larios.

Between 1875 and 1879 the Rural Colonies of Buceite and Tesorillo were established. At the end of the last century, in 1887, the properties of the heirs of the Marquis de Larios became part of the Guadiaro Industrial and Agricultural Society, beginning to be called San Pablo de Buceite and San Martín del Tesorillo.

In the 1930s, the Sociedad Industrial y Agrícola de Guadiaro (Guadiaro Industrial and Agricultural Society) was bought by Juan March Ordinas, a Mallorcan businessman and banker (Banca March), who in 1944 decided to disintegrate the large estate to pass into the hands of small owners that remain to this day.

During the Civil War and the subsequent Francoism there was an important repression in the town, especially with the destruction of La Sauceda.

In 2018, after 20 years, the Junta de Andalucía approved the segregation of San Martín del Tesorillo. Today, Jimena's population of around 7,000 has been made up of an increasing number of British ex-pats.

The town is served by road and rail. The main road stretches north to Ronda, and south to San Roque. The railway station is situated just outside the town in nearby Los Ángeles. Several trains a day stop at Jimena on the line between Algeciras and Granada.

== Castle ==
The castle was built on the hill by the Moors around 750 CE. as part of making Jimena a strategic military position, today it is known as Castle of Jimena de la Frontera. Views stretch as far Gibraltar to the south. It is believed that the castle was built on Roman ruins, constructed using locally sourced limestone.

It was declared an asset of cultural interest with the category of Monument in 1931, it is the emblematic building par excellence of the town. The fortress, probably built on the ruins of the ancient city of Oba and which, due to its easy defense and strategic location, especially in times of Muslim domination and above all, due to its border position, will reach its maximum splendor.

The castle was taken by the Jerezan people in 1430, reconquered by the Granadines in 1451 and definitively integrated into the Crown in 1456.

Inside there is a cemetery with two mass graves from the Civil War.

It consists of an elongated irregular wall to adapt to the terrain at the top. With watchtowers arranged in sections, the set of the Torre del Reloj (or Albarrán) stands out, with a bent entrance arch and cisterns from different periods.

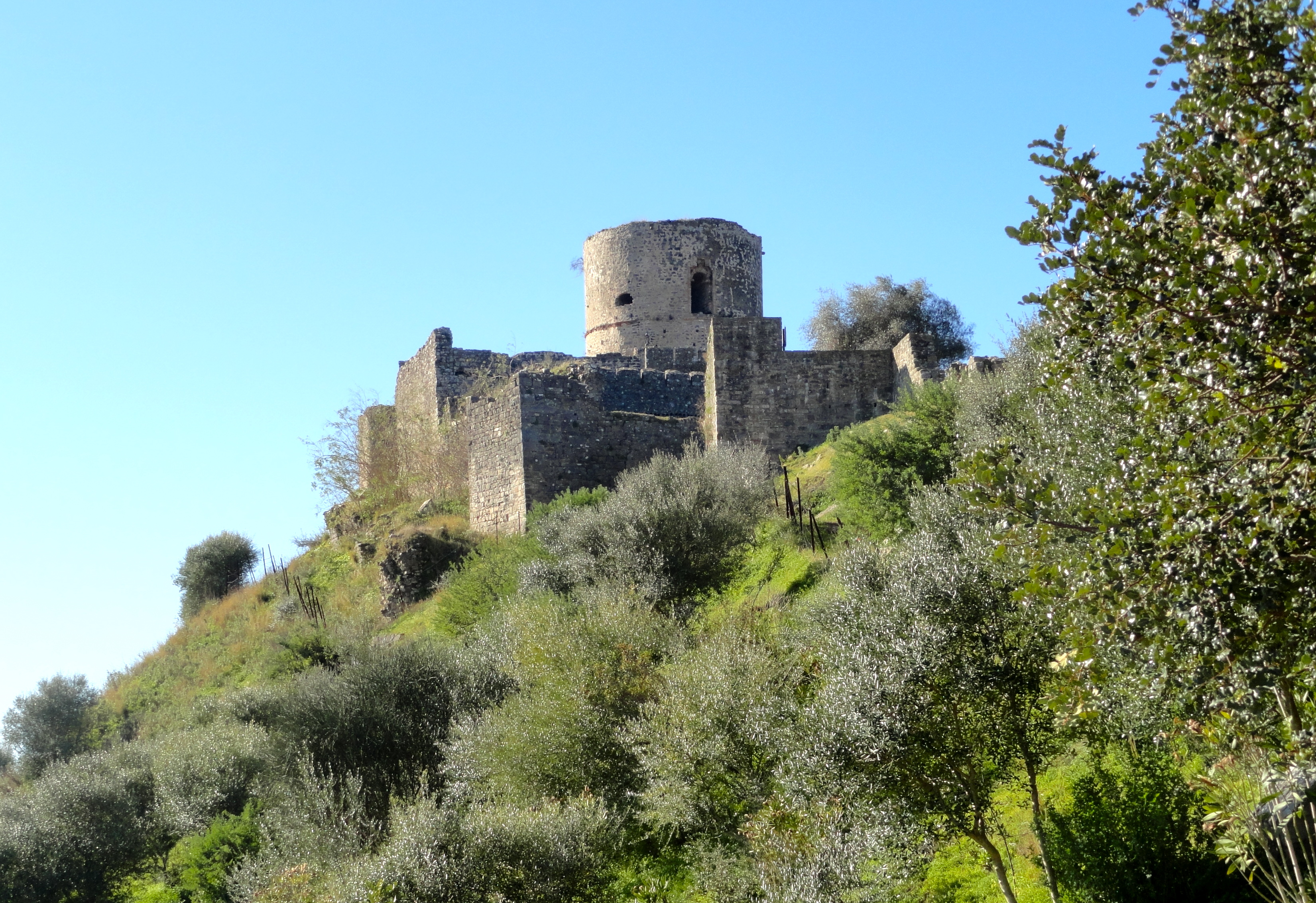
A view of the Castle

The Alcázar also stands out, renovated after the Christian capture, with its airy and circular keep, which inside hides a previous one with a polygonal plan.

== Monuments ==
Declared a historical artistic complex in 1983 by the State and ratified by the Junta de Andalucía's 84/2004 decree, the artistic and monumental heritage of Jimena de la Frontera is extensive:

=== Civil monuments ===
- Cave paintings at the La Laja Alta Cave, where you can see a sample of prehistoric art.

La Laja Alta is a shelter at the bottom of the Garganta de Gamero, on a siliceous sandstone slope, with cave paintings of schematic art. Anthropomorphic figures, quadrupeds, geometric motifs, symbols and a complete naval scene in the lower part are situated on the walls: with red and black strokes made with the fingers, with eight ships whose shapes, varied in size and elements of navigation, dates it possibly prior to 4000 BCE. This cave is the only one where maritime scenes with groups of ships are represented.

- Necropolis of Buceite:

There are archaeological remains of a Byzantine necropolis near San Pablo de Buceite, where funerary remains and coins have been found. In the 1950s a Byzantine tomb was found on the Los Zarzales hill and inside there was a clay pot and a bronze oil lamp, of Byzantine origin, which can be placed chronologically between the 6th and 7th centuries. The lamp is in the Municipal Museum of San Roque.

- Baño de la Reina Mora (Bath of the Moorish Queen):

Behind the castle, there are remains on the ground, probably of a Mozarabic church carved out of living rock. The Baño de la Reina Mora is shaped like a bath, the reasoning behind its name. Most likely, it was a life-size font for a baptism by immersion, a very common practice among early Christians.

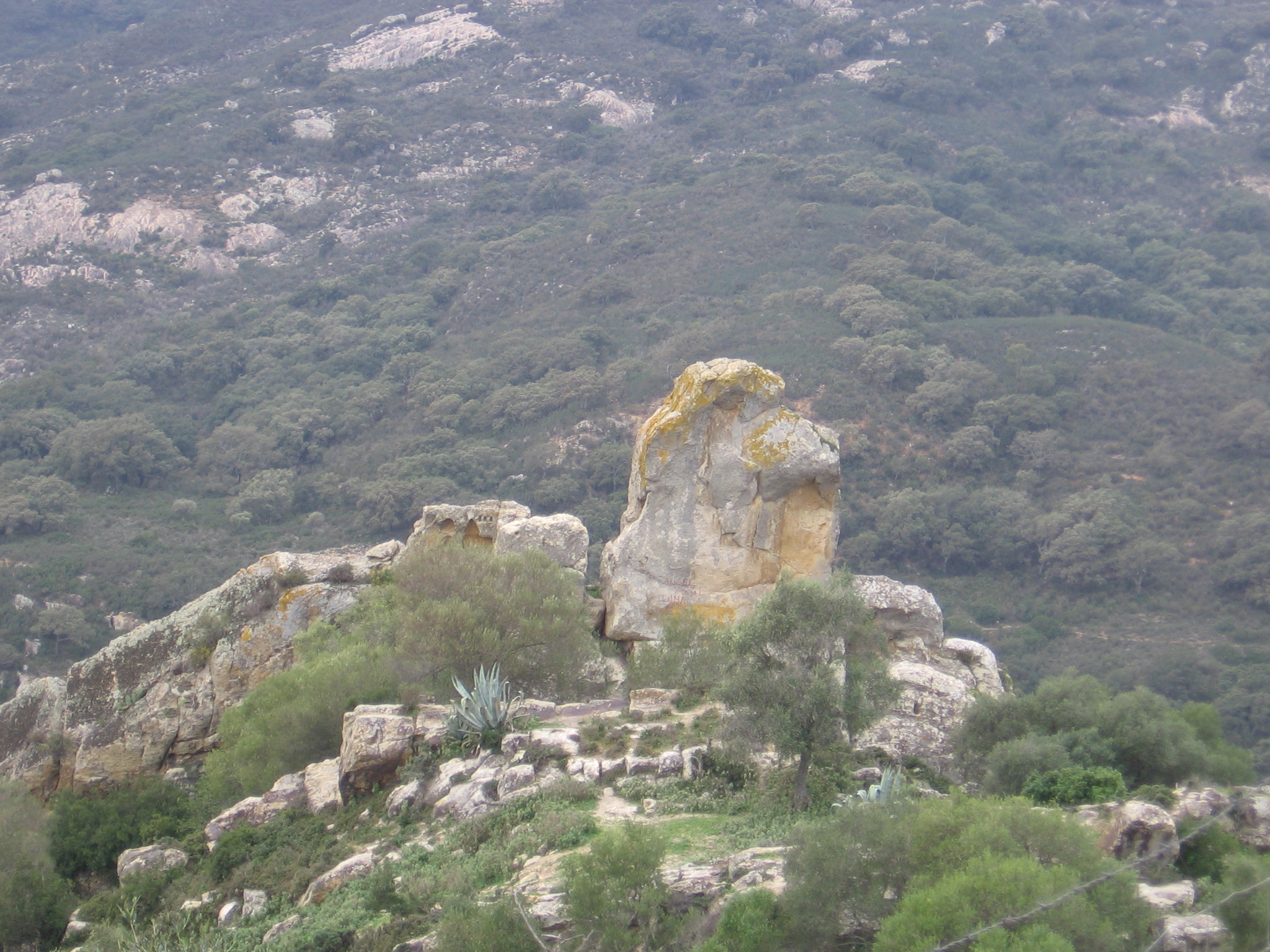
The Baño de la Reina Mora, as seen from the Castle

- Royal Artillery Factory:

The Royal Artillery Factory built in the 18th century can be considered as the second Andalusian blast furnace, with the other one being located at Cartajima. They arise from the efforts made by Eduardo Boyetet who proposed the idea of smelting weapons in the area to King Charles III in 1761. An iron mine was near San Pablo de Buceite, whose production would supply raw material to the Royal Artillery Factory and wood (for fuel) would come from the existing forest masses. The bellows were moved by the water carried by the canal. Its foundry, which didn't prosper until 1777 and was abandoned in 1788, was designed to cover the supply to the Indies, took on the needs arising from Gibraltar, where most of its production was destined. There are remains of a factory that didn't operate on known as La Fábrica de las Bombas (the Bomb Factory) on the banks of the Guadiaro River. On the banks of the Hozgarganta, on La Pasada de Alcalá, there are more significant remains, such as the main wall. The absence of a continuous and sufficient flow from the river sentenced its abandonment. The channel, about 600 metres (2,000 ft) long and 4 metres (13 ft) wide, reaches a depth of 5 metres (16 ft) in some areas. The canal is built with sturdy stonework, sometimes dug out of the rock itself. It became operational in April 1780, coinciding with the Great Siege of Gibraltar.

- "La Sauceda" House of Memory, to commemorate the atrocities that occurred at El Marrufo during the Civil War.

=== Religious monuments ===
- Sanctuary of Our Lady Queen of Angels:

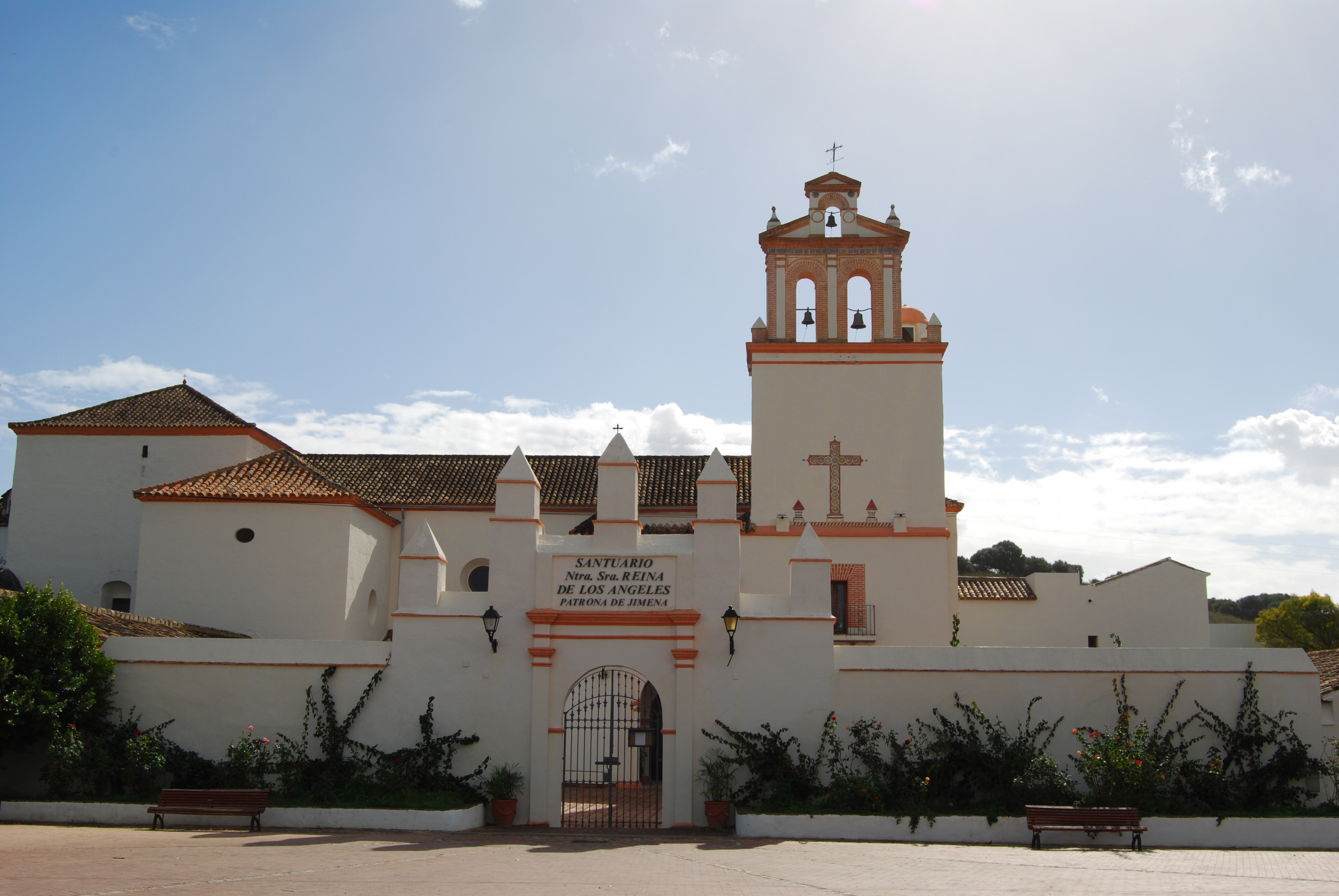
Sanctuary of Our Lady Queen of Angels

The Sanctuary of Our Lady Queen of Angels (Spanish: Santuario de Nuestra Señora Reina de los Ángeles) is located two kilometers from the center of the municipality. It was built at the end of the 15th century and renovated during the 17th century. It housed a community of Franciscans and, after the taking of Gibraltar by the English, it served as a refuge for the Poor Claires that fled from the Rock. The church of the Sanctuary consists of a single barrel-vaulted nave with lunettes, which leads to the main chapel and is closed by a dome on horns and a high choir at the foot. The sacristy and the cloister are noteworthy, a square plan with arches and brick pillars, with a garden in the center. The Virgin's alcove is in the Baroque style and her icon, is made of painted stone and seems very primitive. As with most Marian icons, tradition tells that it was carved by Saint Luke and brought from Antioch to Spain in 190 CE.

- Bell tower of the Church of Our Lady Crowned:

It's an isolated bell tower in the Plaza de la Constitución and is the only remaining part of the church of Nuestra Señora la Coronada (Our Lady Crowned). The first reference we have of La Coronada is in a book by Fray Jerónimo de la Concepción, published in the Spanish Netherlands in 1690. In 1736 the diocesan archives stated that the church already showed disrepair, and after its demolition in 1946 the bell tower remained as the only remaining piece of its existence. It is a prismatic tower with two bodies, the lower one a sturdy parallelepiped with an interior spiral staircase to access the upper body, with four openings.

- Church of Our Lady of Victory:

The Church of Our Lady of Victory, or the old Convent of Saint Anne (Spanish: Iglesia de Nuestra Señora de la Victoria) has two naves and is attached to the old Minim convent. The Minims settled in the place c. 1600, taking over the previous chapel dedicated to Saint Anne. It is very modern, with an airy bell tower, a simple front and an outdoor patio. The two strangely articulated naves attached to the rectory seem to be part of the old structure. The church owes its current name to the patron saint of Málaga, Our Lady of Victory (during the Siege of Málaga by the Catholic Monarchs, they received a Marian icon from Emperor Maximilian of Austria, which they promptly gave the name "Victory").

- Church of Mercy:

At the top the town and close to the Castle, there are remains of a Gothic church (the Iglesia de la Misericordia): the walls, the vault, with stone ribs and brickwork, as well as the central pointed arch. This church with a single nave was likely renovated during the 16th century, given the Renaissance details that it has, such as the Ionic capitals on the semi-columns of the interior, on which arches rest. It stands out due to the façade, with a straight lintel and recessed pilasters, and the pointed arches at the bottom. It now serves a tourist office.

- Chapel of Solace:

The Ermita del Consuelo is an old chapel, in the center of Jimena. It is a deconsecrated building with a brick façade and a semicircular arch.

== Geography ==
Jimena de la Frontera is located in the north of an expanse of fertile plains bordered on the south by the Atlantic Ocean and the Mediterranean Sea. Located in the heart of the Los Alcornocales Natural Park and perched on a hill, the Cerro de San Cristóbal, the municipality has a large variety of landscapes.

Jimena de la Frontera enjoys a moderate Mediterranean climate. There are 3,000 hours of sunshine per year, which contributes to average temperatures of between 18 and 20 °C (64 and 68 °F). However, the rainfall pattern differs significantly from the rest of southern Spain, due to the topography of the Strait of Gibraltar region, which is swept by east and west winds that bring humidity and, therefore, rainfall averaging 900 to 1,000 mm (35 to 39 in).

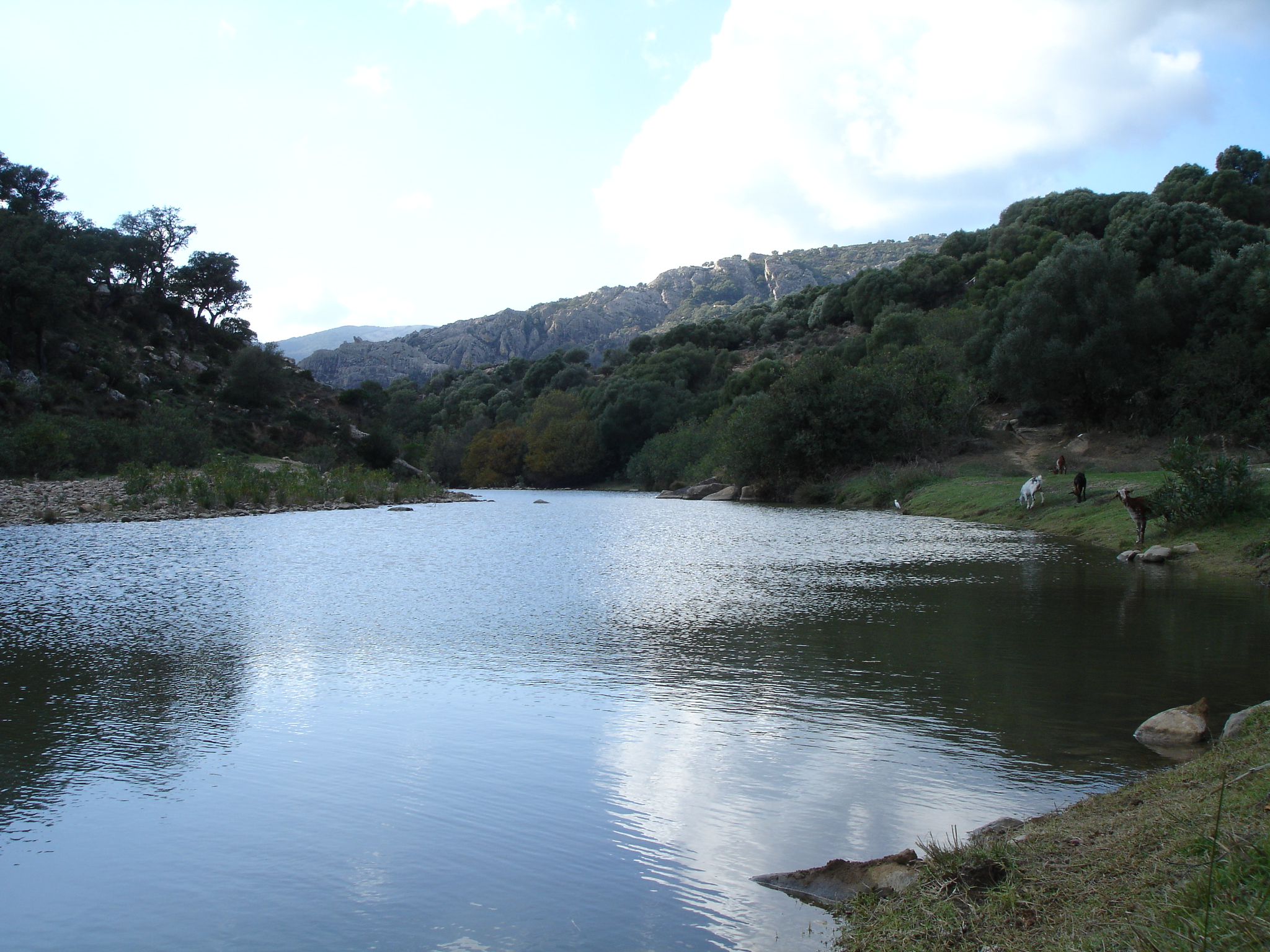
The Hozgarganta, near Jimena

For this reason, rivers that have a regular flow – in contrast to the discontinuous flow of many Andalusian rivers on the Mediterranean side – are of great importance. Three of such rivers flow through the municipality: the Guadiaro, a river from the province of Málaga, which ends its course in the province of Cádiz, and the Guadarranque, a river that rises in Jimena de la Frontera. The most important river, however, is the Hozgarganta, which flows into the Guadiaro shortly before its mouth. It flows through the urban centre of Jimena and is characterised by its unregulated wildness. The river has a well-preserved fauna and flora, and is covered in places by a gallery forest; and is one of the last untouched rivers in Spain.

== Demographics ==
demographic vertical bar chart of Jimena de la Frontera between 1842 and 2021
De jure census population, according to the INE.
De facto census population, according to the INE.

== Festivals ==
- Town Carnival - February (March in 2019)
- Agricultural Fair - Second week of May
- Annual Village Fair - Second week of August
- Devotion to the Reina de los Angeles - First week of September
- Festival de Música de Jimena de la Frontera- Second week of July

== Gallery ==
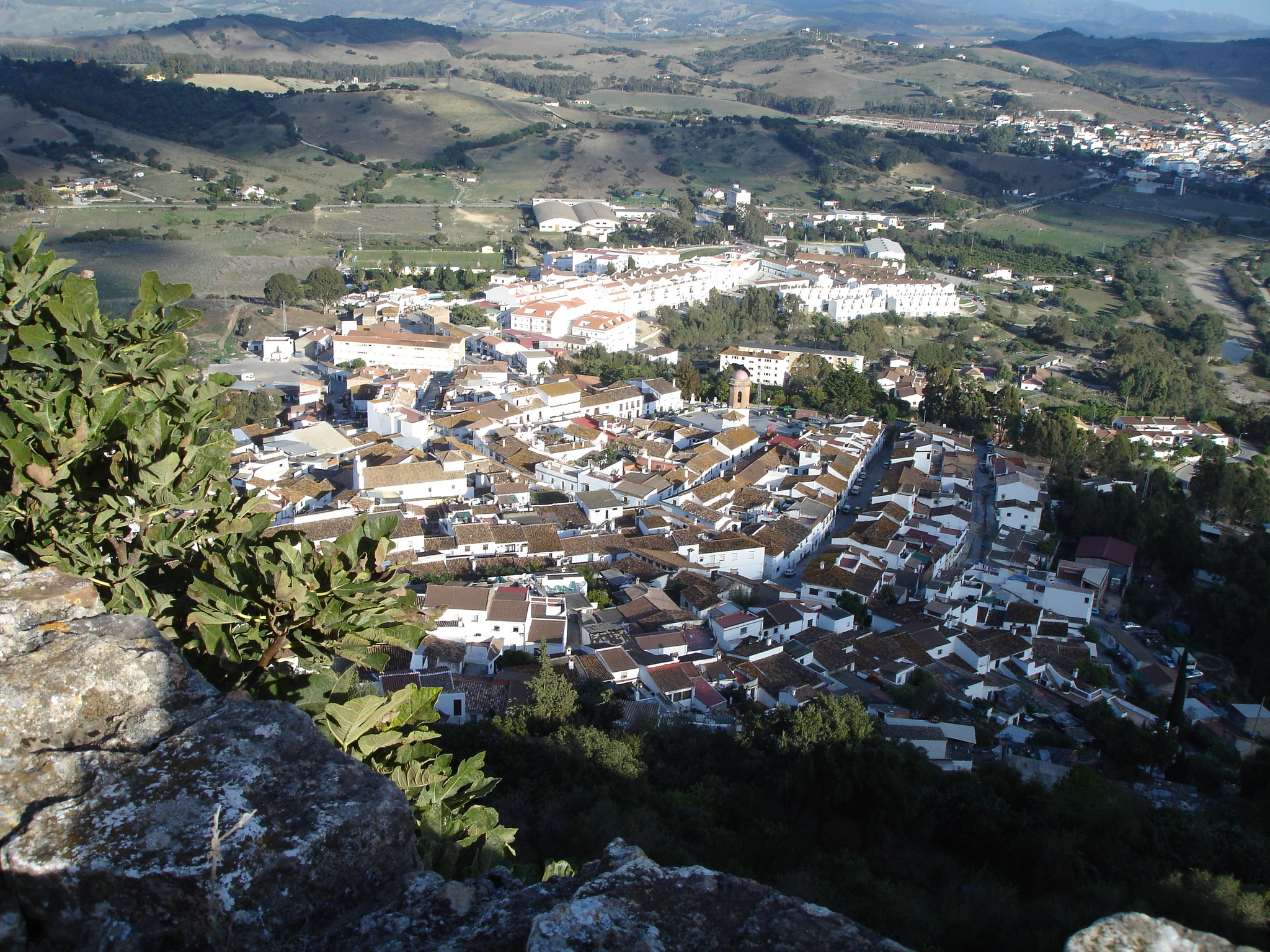
Jimena from its castle

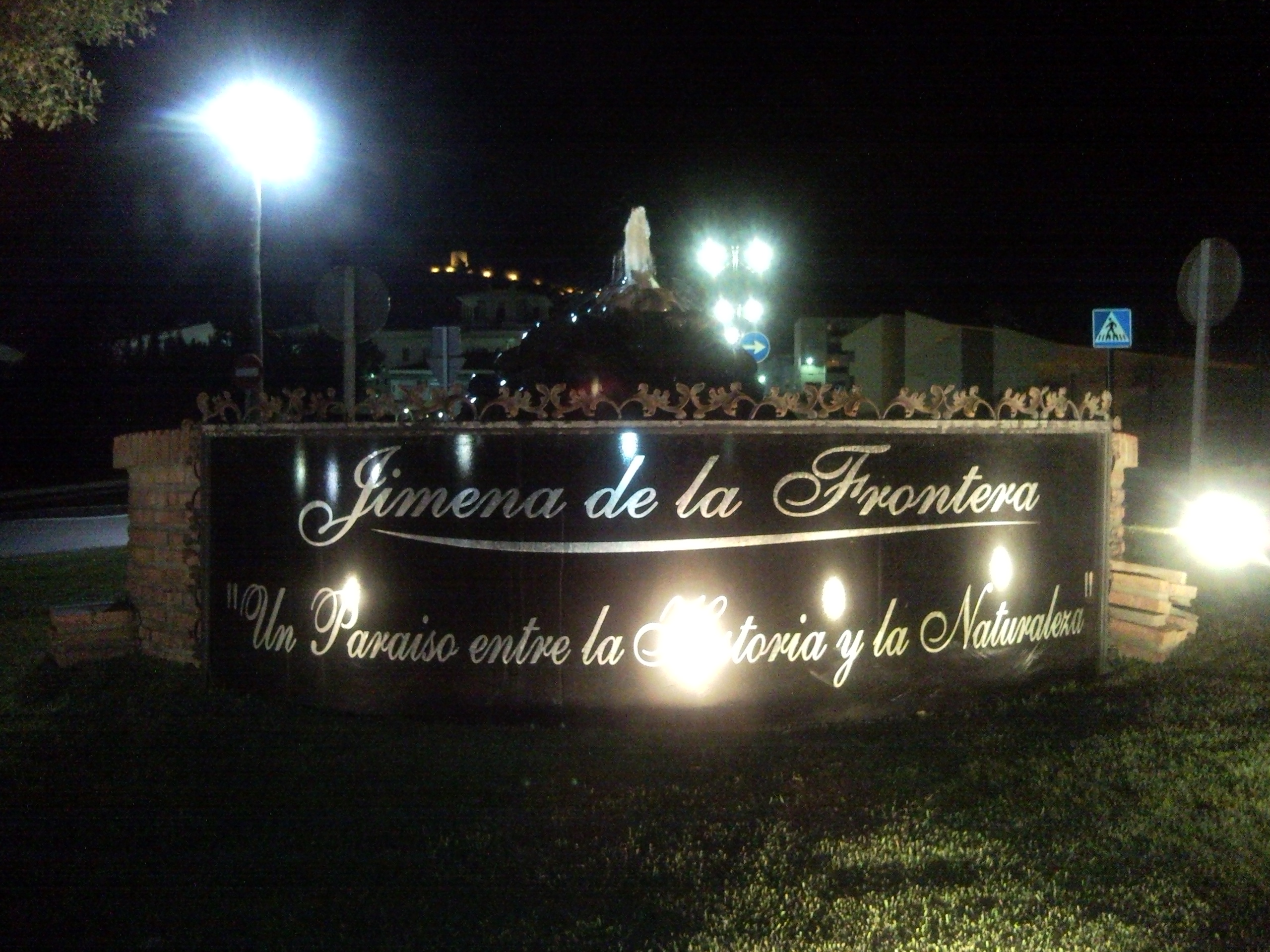
At night. Castle lit up in background

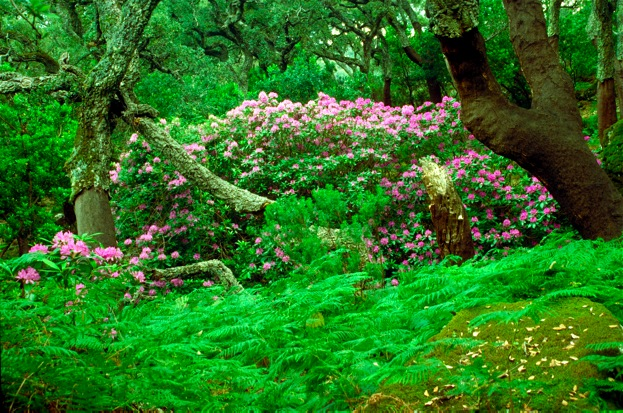
Los Alcornocales Natural Park view

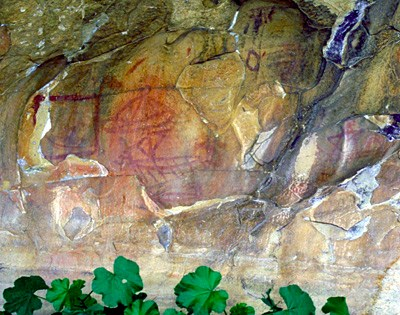
Prehistoric paintings inside Cueva de la Laja Alta

== See also ==
- List of municipalities in Cádiz
