= Castle of Jimena de la Frontera =

- Castillo de Jimena de la Frontera (Spanish)
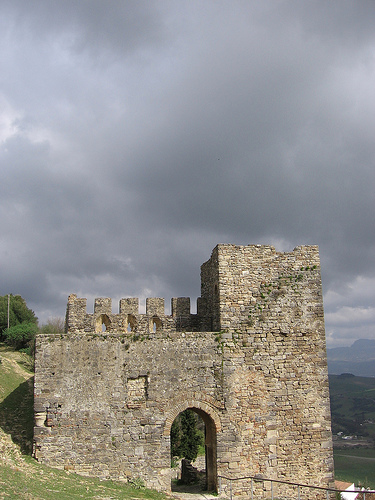

- Location within Spain
- 36.432334°N 5.455473°W
- Location: Jimena de la Frontera, Spain

Spanish Cultural Heritage
- Official name: Castillo de Jimena de la Frontera
- Type: Non-movable
- Criteria: Monument
- Designated: 1931
- Reference no.: RI-51-0000500

The Castle of Jimena de la Frontera (Spanish: Castillo de Jimena de la Frontera) is a castle located in Jimena de la Frontera, Spain. It was declared Bien de Interés Cultural in 1931.

The castle is situated on the outskirts of Jimena de la Frontera in the Province of Cádiz, Spain. The castle was originally built by the Grenadian Moors of the Umayyad Caliphate ruling over the area of Hispania Baetica (modern Andalusia) in the 8th Century. It served as one of many castles guarding both the approach to the fortifications around Gibraltar and the Bay of Algeciras where the strategic and important Moorish stronghold and fortress of Algeciras was located.

== History ==
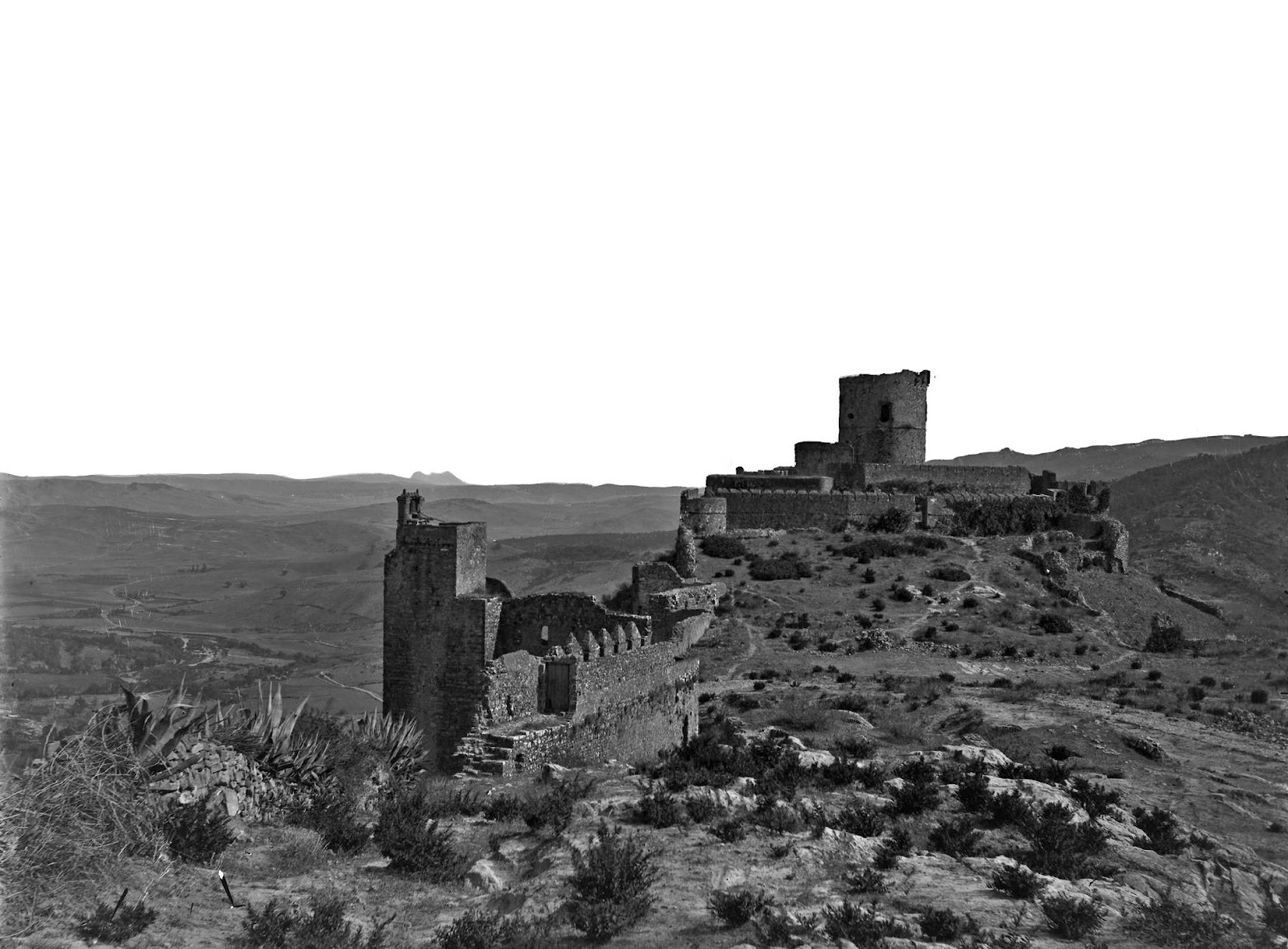
Photo of the Castillo de Jimena taken sometime between 1879 and 1890

The fortress was likely built over the ruins of the ancient city of Oba which dated to the pre-Roman Celtiberian period. Given its strategic location on the frontier of the Gibraltar region, this fortress proved an important Moorish stronghold throughout the Muslim domination of the Iberian Peninsula.

The castle was taken by the Jerezanos in 1430 and retaken by the Moorish Kingdom of Granada in 1451. In 1465, it was integrated into the Kingdom of Castille as the property of the crown. It was declared a national monument of Spain in 1931, described as the building that best represents the town of Jimena de la Frontera.

== Structure ==
The outer defenses consist of a long irregular wall that is lengthened in places to adapt to the uneven mountainous terrain. Watchtowers line this wall at regular intervals. The most well known tower is the Torre del Reloj or Albarrán (English: Clock Tower) and together, the towers have a very effective line of sight and defense forming an easily defensible arch of a fire zone. Various trenches also exist, all dug in different eras.

Inside the walls stands the Alcázar which was built or renovated after the Christian takeover of the castle. the Torre del Homenaje, with its large circular dome juts out of the Alcázar at a height of 13 meters making it the tallest tower of the castle. The inside of the Torre del Homenaje hides an earlier polygonal pattern tower that was presumably built over after the Christian takeover.

== Gallery ==
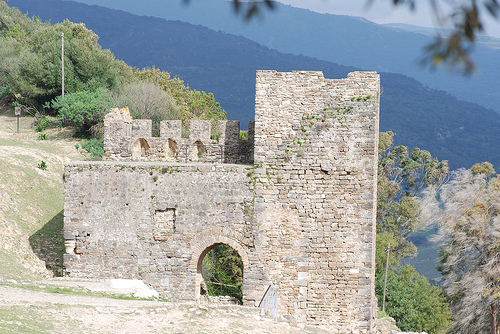
Castle door from inside

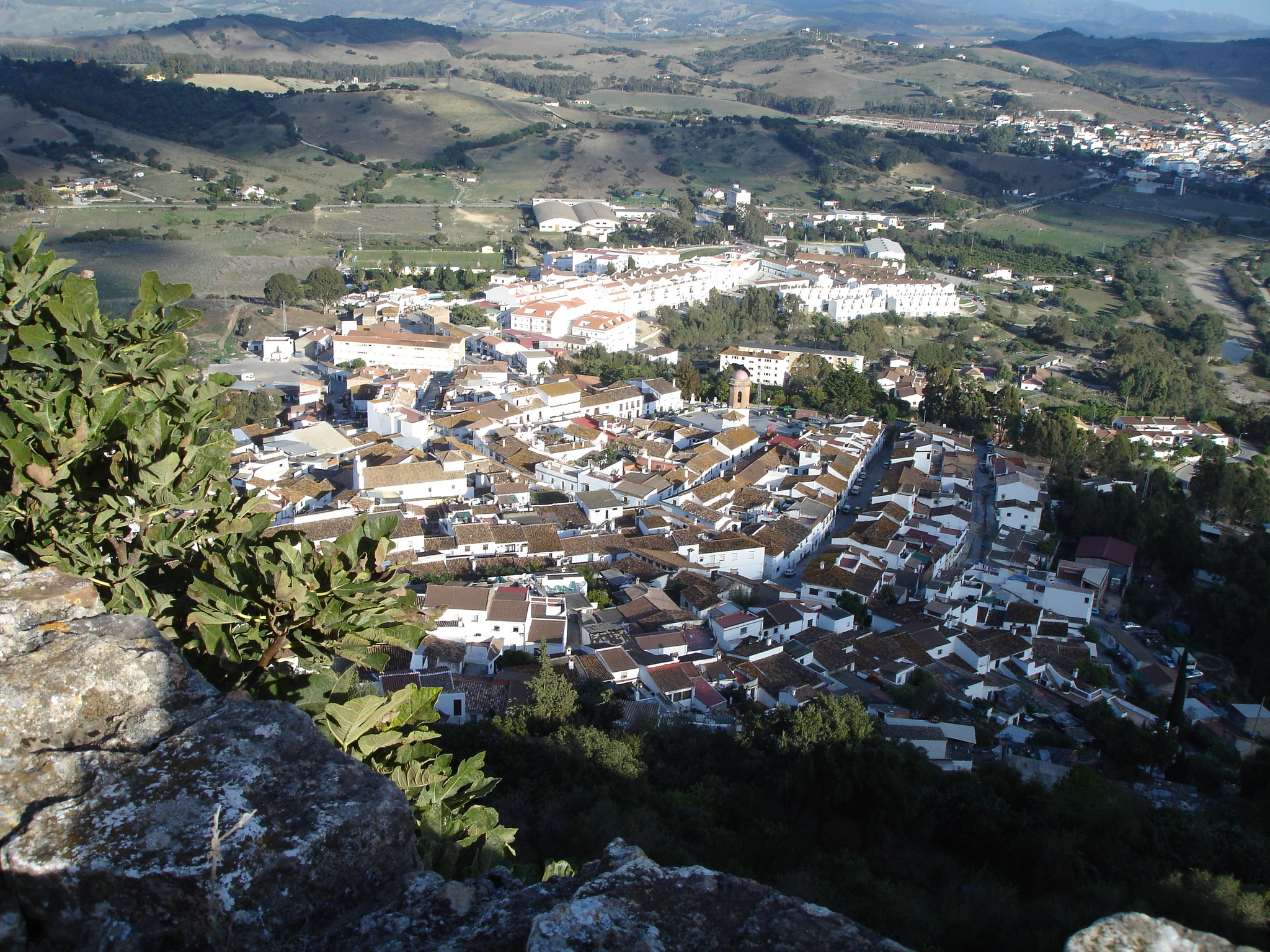
Town of Jimena from the Castle

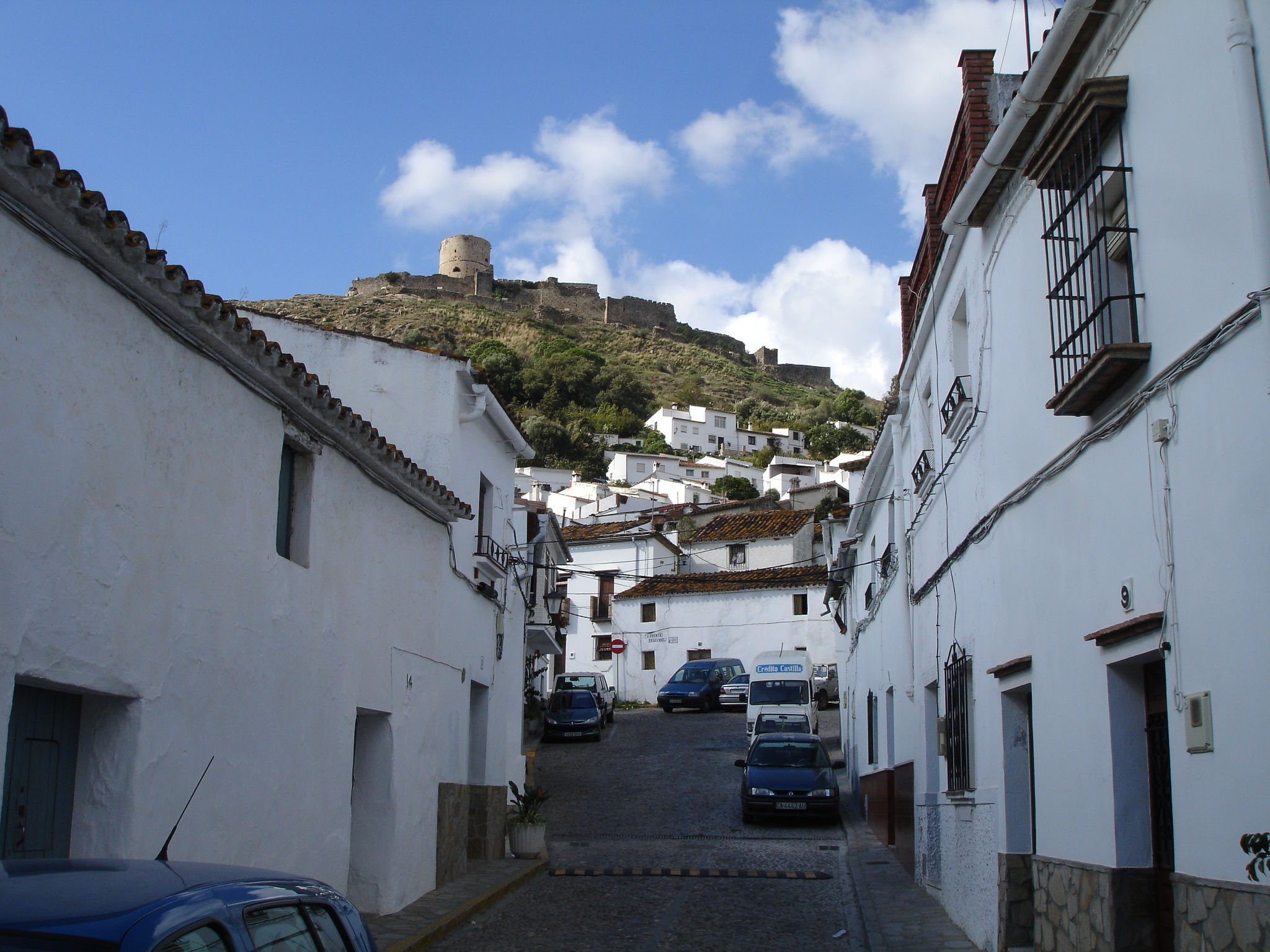
Castle view from Jimena
