= San Martín del Tesorillo =

- Municipality
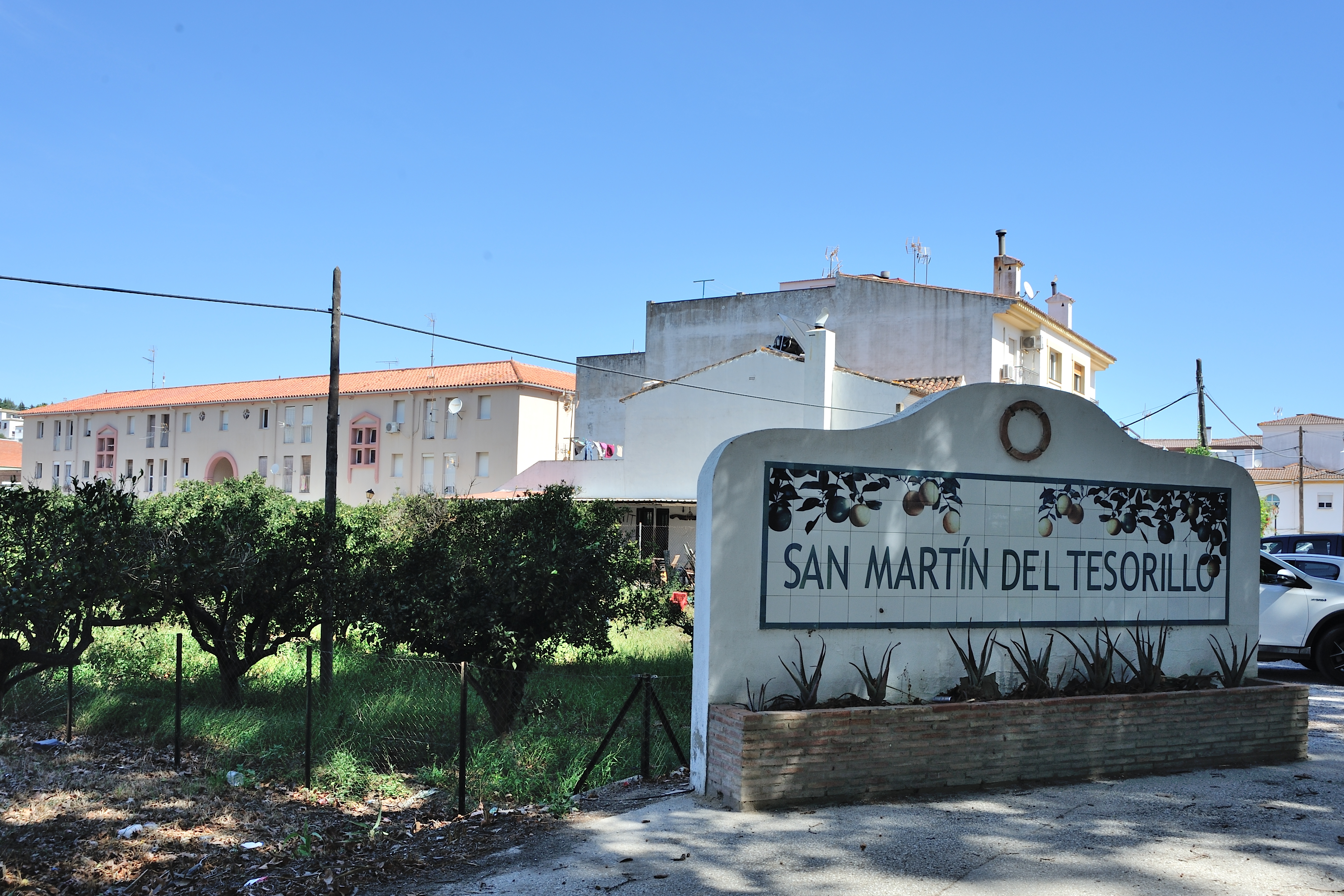

- Flag Coat of arms

- Location in Spain
- Coordinates: 36°20′39″N 5°19′13″W
- Country: Spain
- Autonomous community: Andalusia
- Province: Cádiz
- Comarca: Campo de Gibraltar
- Judicial district: San Roque

Government
  - Alcalde: Jesús Fernández Rey (IU)

Area
  - Total: 48.57 km^{2} (18.75 sq mi)
- Elevation: 12 m (39 ft)
- Time zone: UTC+1 (CET)
  - Summer (DST): UTC+2 (CEST)
- Website: Official website

San Martín del Tesorillo is a municipality located in the province of Cádiz, in the autonomous community of Andalusia, Spain. It was constituted as an independent municipality from Jimena de la Frontera on 2 October 2018.

== History ==
The first agricultural colony was founded by Martín Larios y Larios, son of Martín Larios Herreros, the first Marquess of Larios, and president of the Guadiaro Industrial and Agricultural Society. This company, together with the Larios de Gibraltar Society, created several agricultural colonies in the Campo de Gibraltar area, among them San Martín del Tesorillo, which was dedicated to the cultivation and transformation of wheat; San Pablo de Buceite, dedicated to the cultivation and transformation of olive oil; and San Luis de Sabinillas, with sugar production. These foundations were produced after buying large estates from the House of Medina Sidonia in 1869. In the 1930s, the famous Majorcan smuggler and landowner, Juan March, bought the latifundios to the Larios family and divided them into plots, putting them up for sale to farmers in other areas of Andalusia and Valencia. The presence of settlers from Jimena and other municipalities in the Campo de Gibraltar was scarce, it seems, due to the misgivings that this landowner produced in the region.

Although San Martín del Tesorillo was declared an agricultural colony in 1879, its consolidation as a population center began in the 1930s after its division into parcels and the arrival of settlers. The recognition of municipal autonomy and its jurisdictional term, of 4857 hectares, was approved by Decree of the Junta de Andalucía on 24 April 1999 under the figure of an Autonomous Local Entity. Since 1999, its City Council had a series of its own powers and others delegated by the Jimena de la Frontera city council and rights over the income and debts generated in its jurisdictional term. In 2018, San Martín del Tesorillo was separated from the city council of Jimena de la Frontera and since October 3 of that year is officially a new municipality.
