= Festival de Música de Jimena de la Frontera =

Festival de Música de Jimena de la Frontera is a music festival in Jimena de la Frontera, Spain.
