= San Pablo de Buceite =

- Town
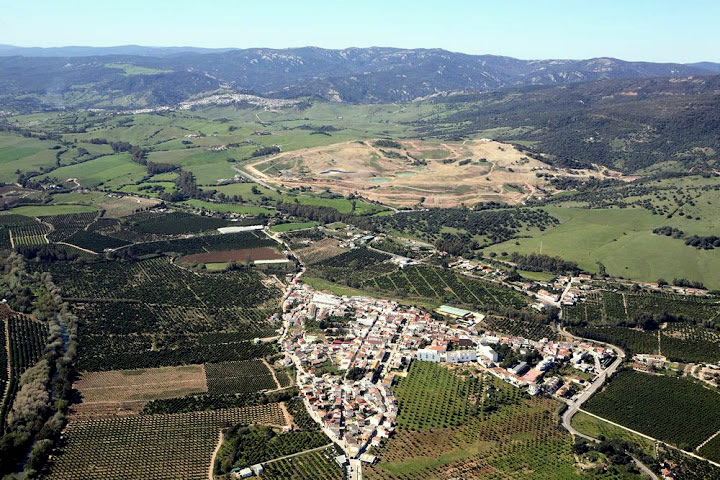
- Aerial photograph of the town.

- Location in the Province of Cádiz San Pablo de Buceite (Andalusia) San Pablo de Buceite (Spain)
- Coordinates: 36°28′N 5°24′W
- Country: Spain
- Autonomous community: Andalusia
- Province: Cádiz
- Comarca: Campo de Gibraltar
- Municipality: Jimena de la Frontera

Population (2018)
  - Total: ~1,800
- Demonym: Sampableño / a
- Time zone: UTC+1 (CET)
  - Summer (DST): UTC+2 (CEST)
- Postal code: 11320

San Pablo de Buceite is a locality in Andalusia, Spain.

The town is on the Algeciras-Bobadilla railway.

== Media interest ==
In 2013 Michael Portillo featured the railway station at San Pablo de Buceite in his second TV series of Great Continental Railway Journeys. The series was based on a 1913 guidebook to the railways of Europe.
