= Festival de Música Española de Cádiz =

Festival de Música Española de Cádiz is an annual music festival in Cádiz, Spain.
