= Castellar de la Frontera =

- Municipality
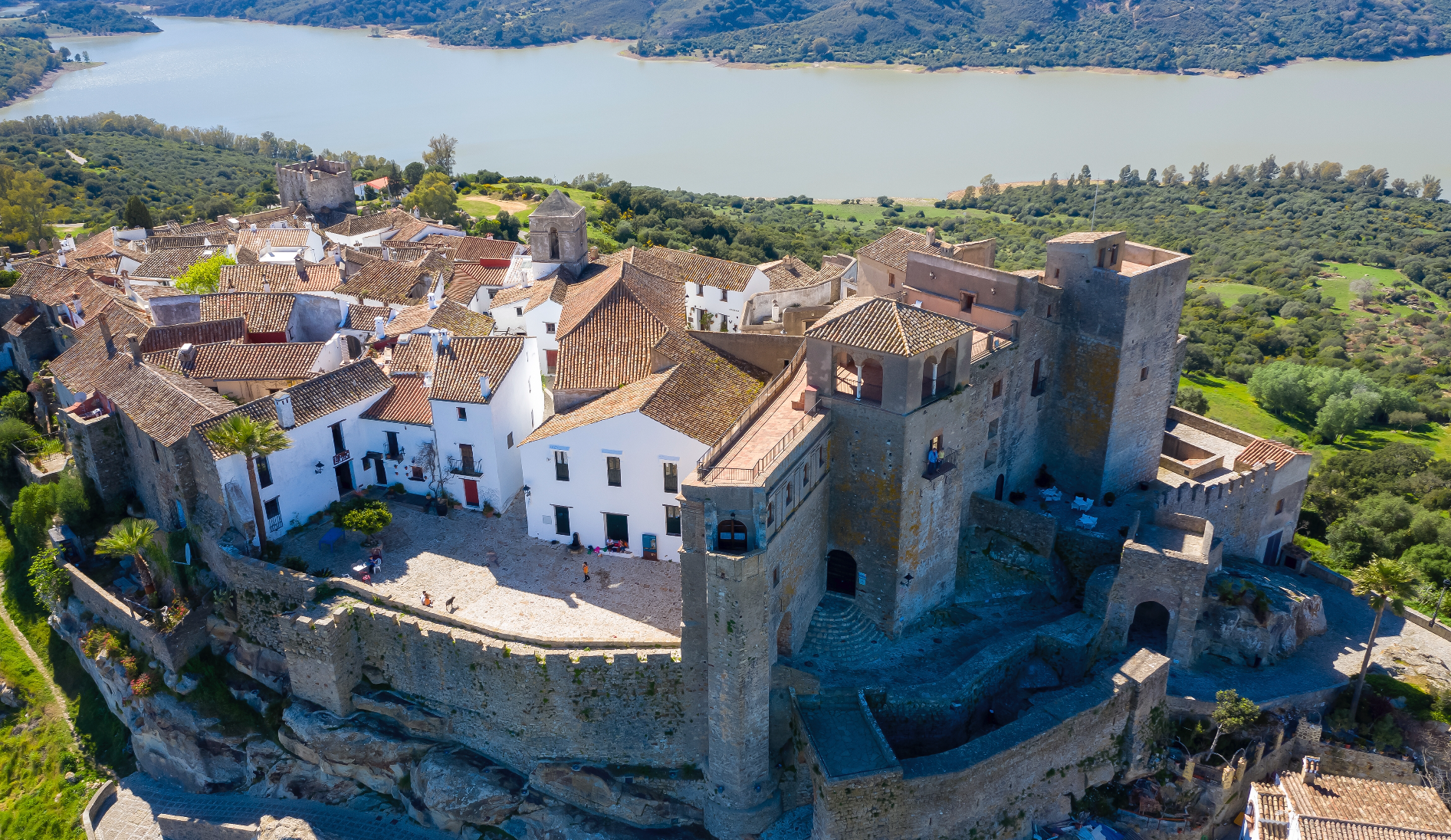
- Castellar de la Frontera

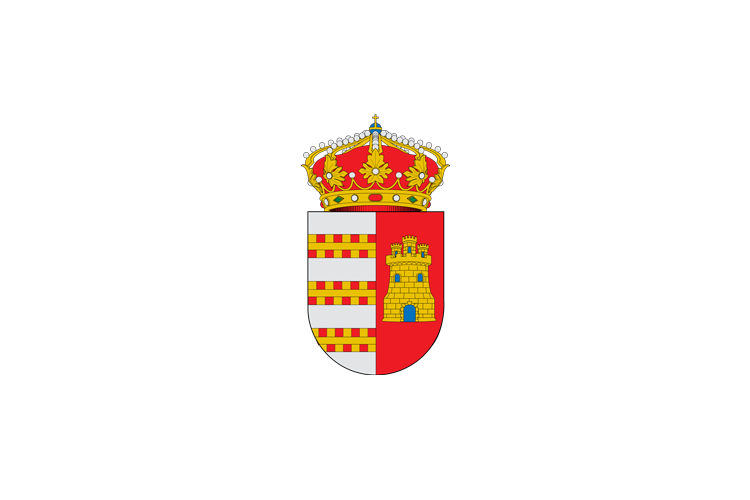
- Flag Coat of arms

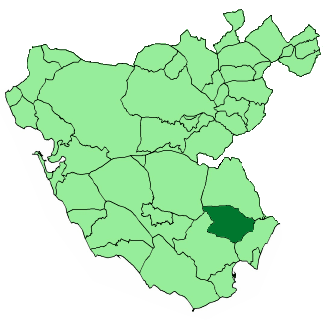
- Location of Castellar de la Frontera

- Location in the Province of Cádiz Castellar de la Frontera (Andalusia) Castellar de la Frontera (Spain)
- Coordinates: 36°19′N 5°27′W
- Country: Spain
- Autonomous community: Andalusia
- Province: Cádiz
- Comarca: Campo de Gibraltar
- Judicial district: San Roque
- Founded: 1971 (Pueblo Nuevo)

Government
  - Mayor: Adrian Vaca (PSOE)

Area
  - Total: 178.84 km^{2} (69.05 sq mi)
- Elevation: 47 m (154 ft)

Population (2025-01-01)
  - Total: 2,984
  - Density: 16.69/km^{2} (43.21/sq mi)
- Demonym(s): Castellarenses, Chisparreros
- Time zone: UTC+1 (CET)
  - Summer (DST): UTC+2 (CEST)
- Postal code: 11350, Railway station: 11349
- Dialing code: (+34) 956
- Website: Official website

Castellar de la Frontera is a town and municipality located in the province of Cádiz, in Andalusia, Spain. It is a medieval town within a castle.

== Description ==
Castellar de la Frontera is a village within a castle surrounded by the walls of a well preserved Moorish-Christian fortress. It is located within the Parque Natural de Los Alcornocales next to a reservoir formed by the Guadarranque River. The village was abandoned in the 1970s and its inhabitants moved to the aptly named Nuevo Castellar (Spanish: New Castellar). The derelict state of the village attracted a number of Germans who took over the empty houses and built temporary dwellings outside the walls. The village was later repopulated reporting a population in 2012 of 3,202. On clear days you can see the North African coast, Gibraltar and the villages on the mountains near Málaga to the north. Castellar is in an isolated location, at the end of a mountain road that runs off the A-368. It is 16 kilometres (9.9 mi) from Castellar to the inter-city N-340 road and 25 kilometres (16 mi) to Gibraltar or Algeciras.

== See also ==
- List of municipalities in Cádiz
