= Campo de Gibraltar =

Coordinates: 36°08′N 5°27′W

- Comarca
- Flag Coat of arms
- Motto: Pro Geographia, Historia et Voluntate Conivncti (Latin for 'United by geography, history, and will')
- Location of Campo de Gibraltar in Andalusia, Spain

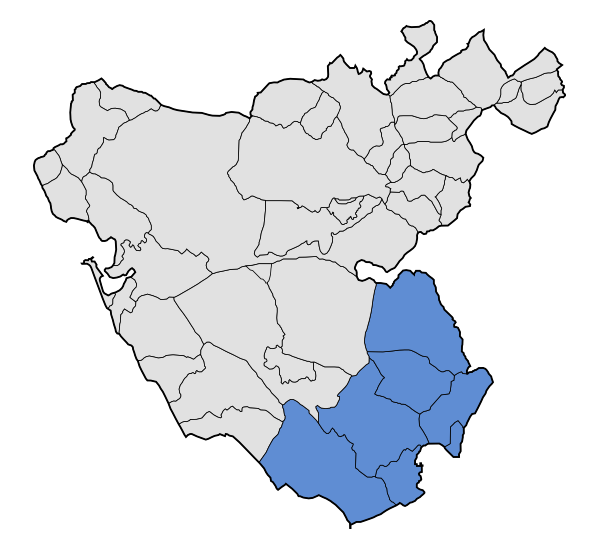
- Location of Campo de Gibraltar in the province of Cádiz
- Country: Spain
- Autonomous community: Andalusia
- Province: Province of Cádiz
- Municipalities: List: Algeciras, Los Barrios, Castellar de la Frontera, Jimena de la Frontera, La Línea de la Concepción, San Roque, Tarifa

Area
  - Total: 1,527.5 km^{2} (589.8 sq mi)

Population (2023) (Note: Estimate at 1 January 2023: Instituto Nacional de Estadística, Madrid.)
  - Total: 276,335
  - Density: 180.91/km^{2} (468.55/sq mi)
- Demonym: Campogibraltareños
- Time zone: UTC+1 (CET)
  - Summer (DST): UTC+2 (CEST)
- Largest municipality: Algeciras

Campo de Gibraltar (Spanish pronunciation: [ˈkampo ðe xiβɾalˈtaɾ]) is one of the six comarcas (county) in the province of Cádiz, Spain, in the southwestern part of the autonomous community of Andalusia, the southernmost part of mainland Europe. It comprises the municipalities of Algeciras, La Línea de la Concepción, San Roque, Los Barrios, Castellar de la Frontera, Jimena de la Frontera, San Martín del Tesorillo and Tarifa. This comarca was established in 2003 by the Government of Andalusia.

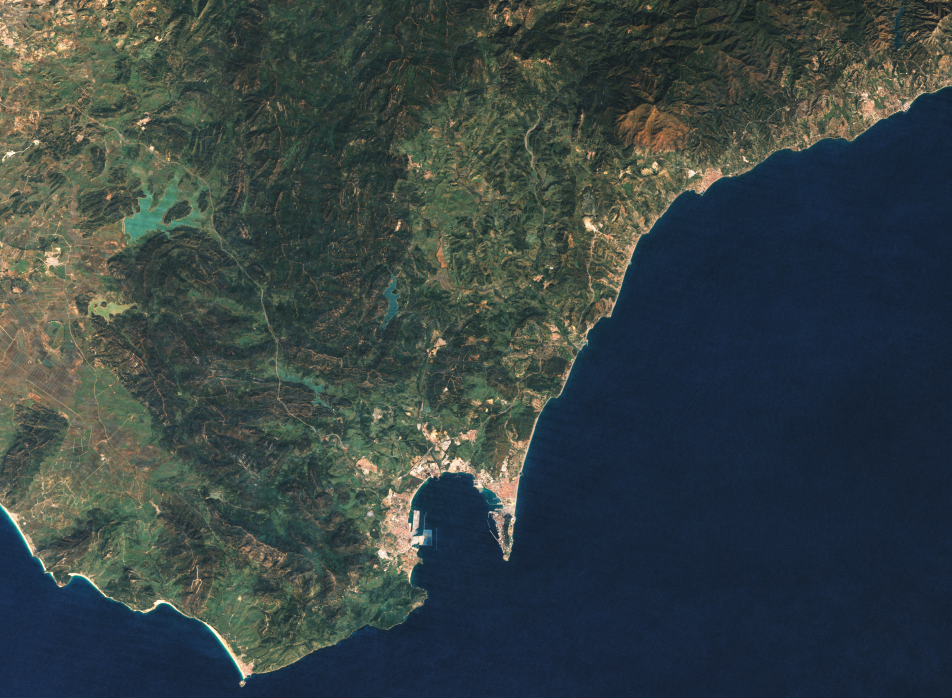
Satellite view

Its name comes from the municipal territory of the town of Gibraltar, now a British Overseas Territory. Until 1704, the Campo de Gibraltar was simply the territory for the municipality of Gibraltar, about 500 km^{2} (190 sq mi) corresponding approximately to the current municipalities of Algeciras, San Roque, Los Barrios and La Línea de la Concepción. Following the capture of Gibraltar during the War of the Spanish Succession, the former inhabitants settled nearby creating Algeciras, San Roque, and Los Barrios. In 1759, each of them was established as a different municipality.

== Municipalities ==
The Campo de Gibraltar comarca is composed of the following eight municipalities:

Arms	Municipality	Location	Area (km^{2})	Population (2023) (Note: Estimate at 1 January 2023: Instituto Nacional de Estadística, Madrid.)	Density(/km2)
	Algeciras	Bay of Gibraltar	85.8	123,639	1,441
	Los Barrios	Interior; Los Alcornocales Natural Park; Bay of Gibraltar	331.3	24,219	73.1
	Castellar de la Frontera	Interior; Los Alcornocales Natural Park	178.8	3,020	16.9
	Jimena de la Frontera	Interior; Los Alcornocales Natural Park	297.1	6,675	22.4
	La Línea de la Concepción	Bay of Gibraltar; Mediterranean coast	19.3	63,773	3,304
	San Martín del Tesorillo	Interior; Los Alcornocales Natural Park	48.6	2,742	56.4
	San Roque	Interior - Bay of Gibraltar; Mediterranean coast	146.9	33,646	229
	Tarifa	Atlantic coast Los Alcornocales Natural Park	419.7	18,621	44.3
	Total		1,527.5	276,335	180.9

== Gallery ==
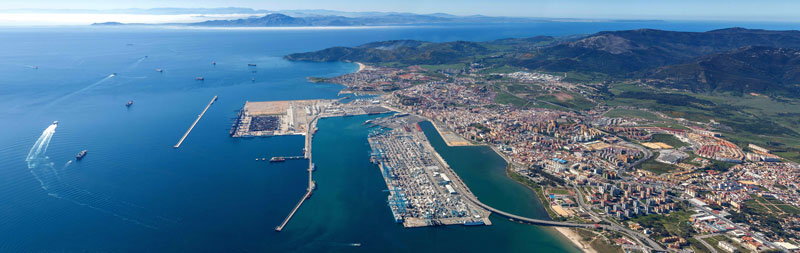
Port of Algeciras.

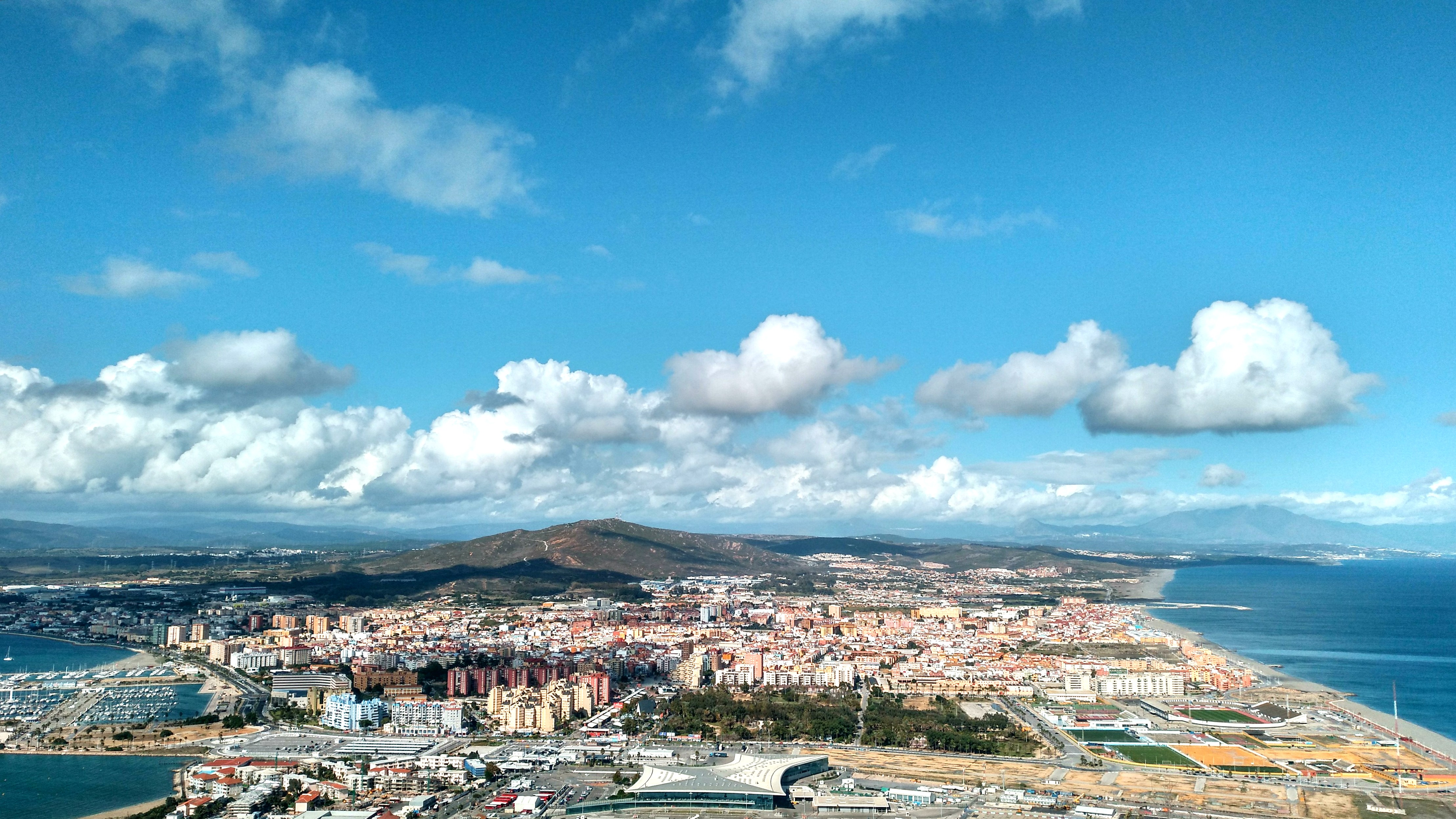
La Línea de la Concepción vistas from the Rock of Gibraltar.

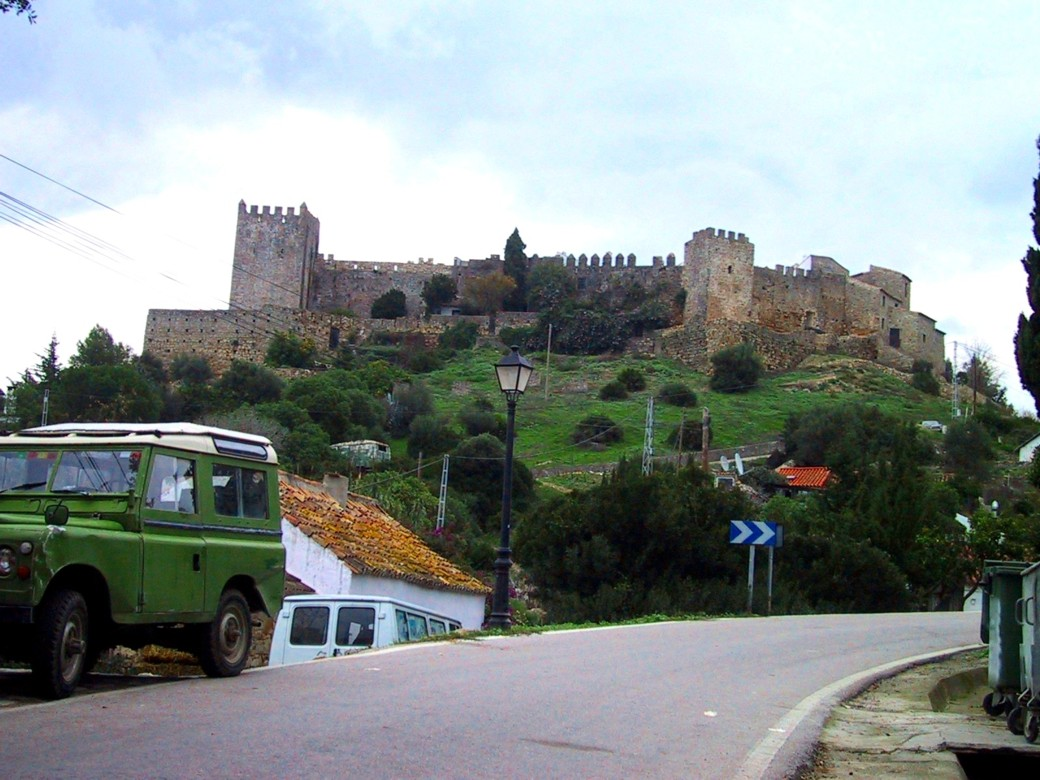
Castellar de la Frontera castle.

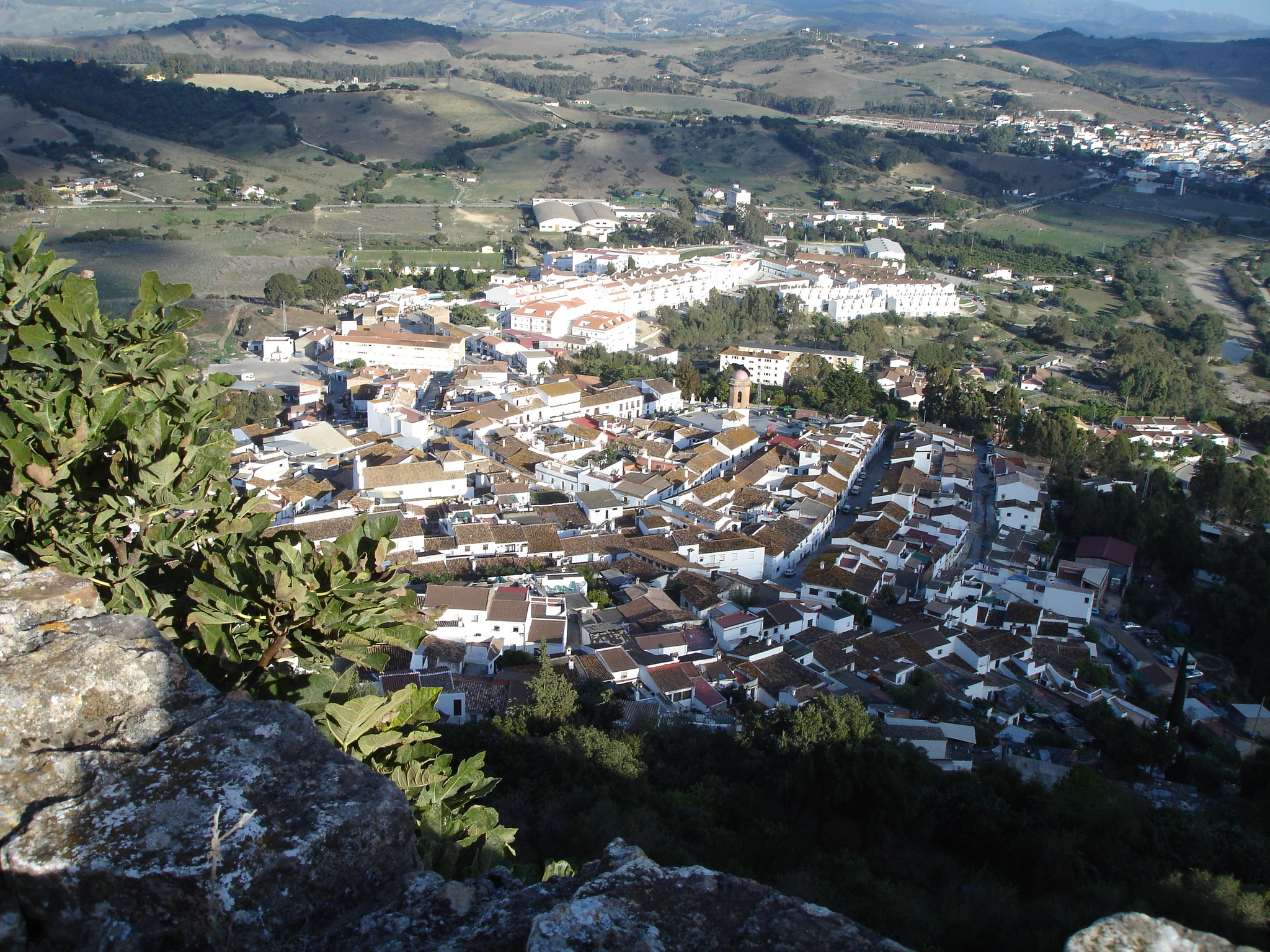
Jimena de la Frontera view from its castle.

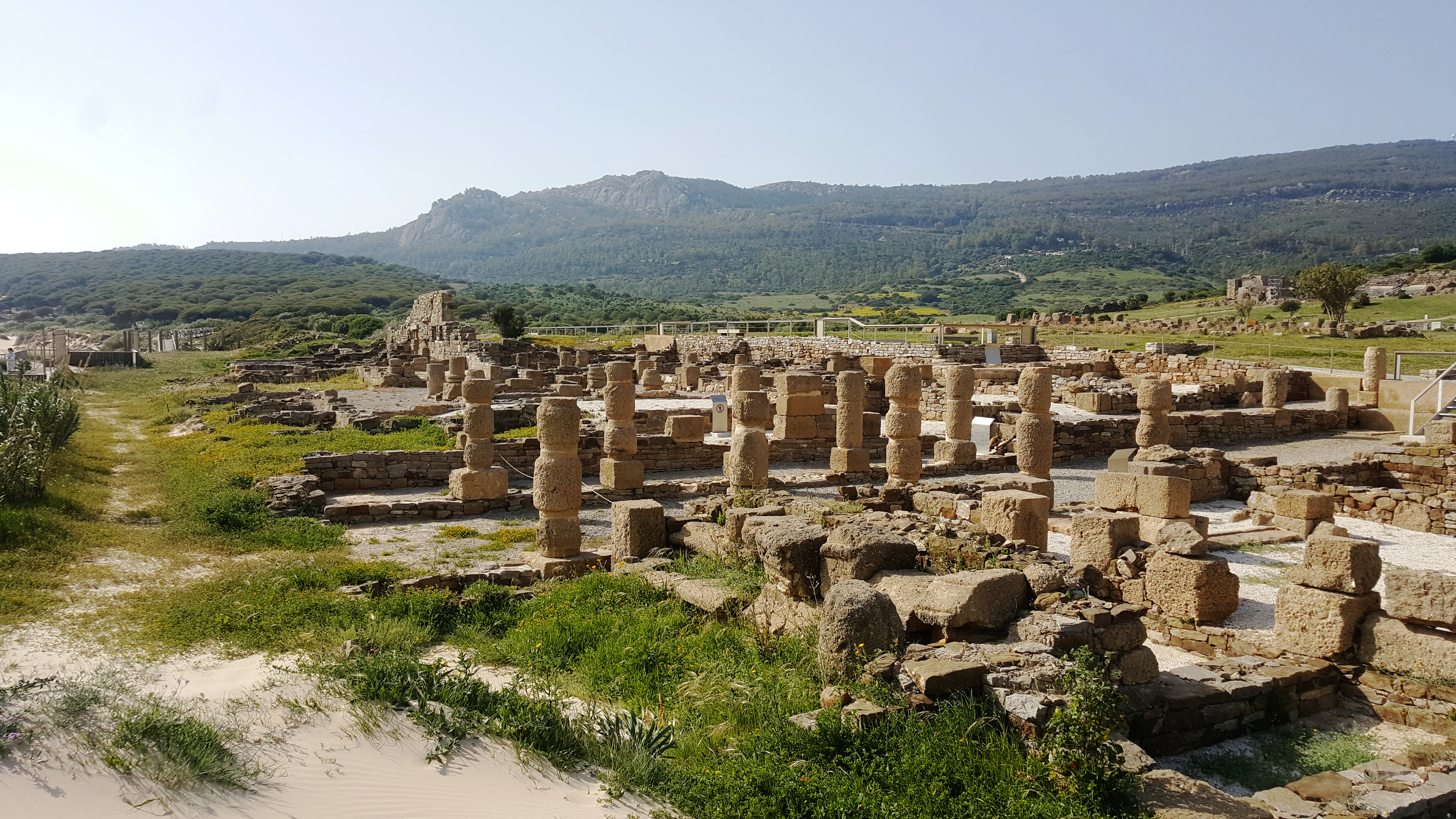
Ruins of the ancient roman town Baelo Claudia.

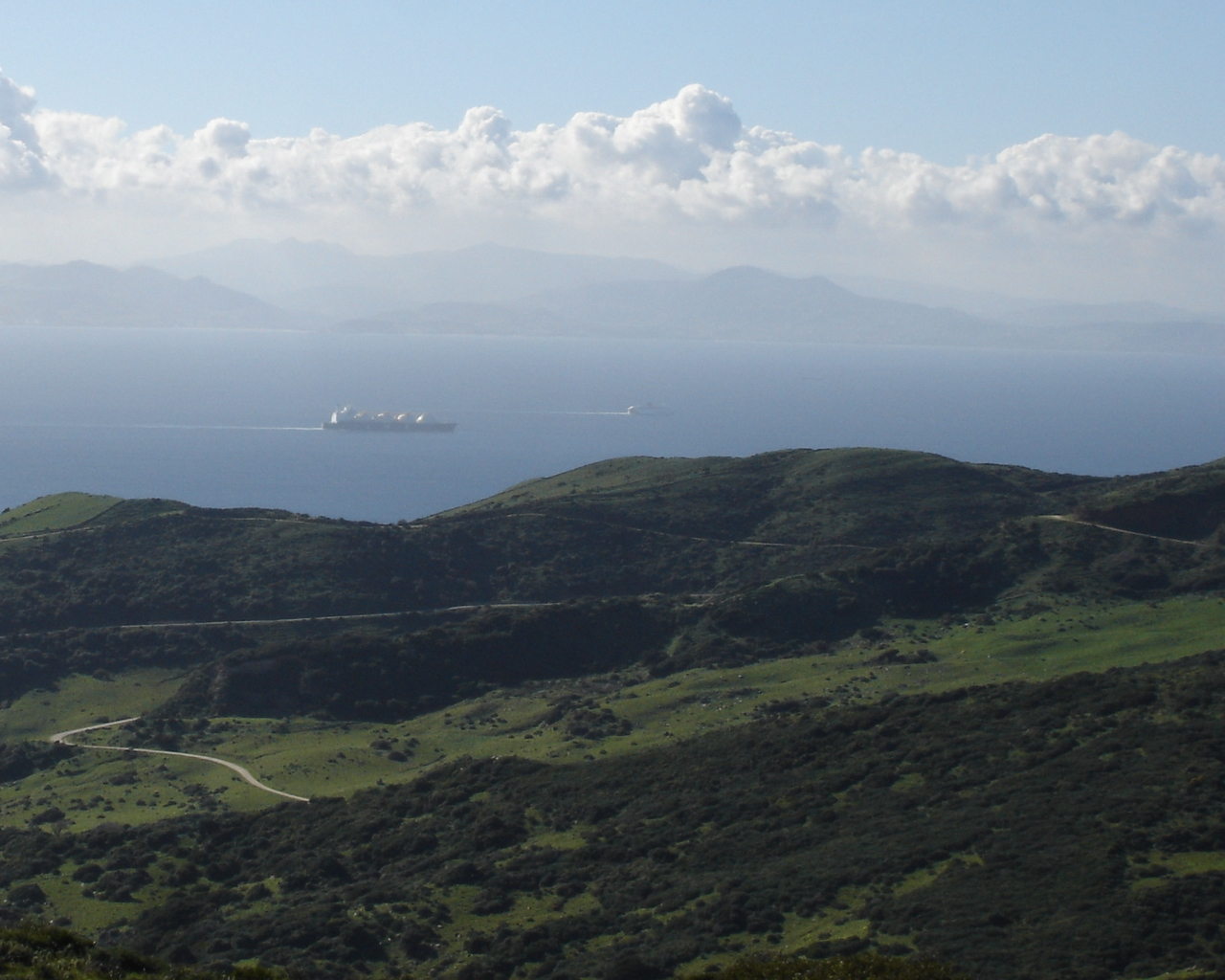
View of the Strait of Gibraltar, Africa can be seen in the distance.
