= Cádiz =

Municipality in Andalusia, Spain

- Municipality
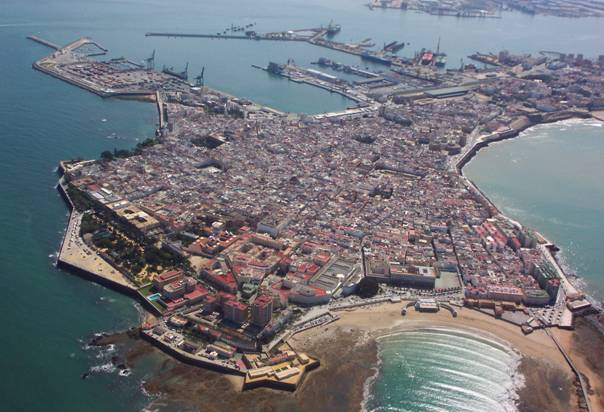
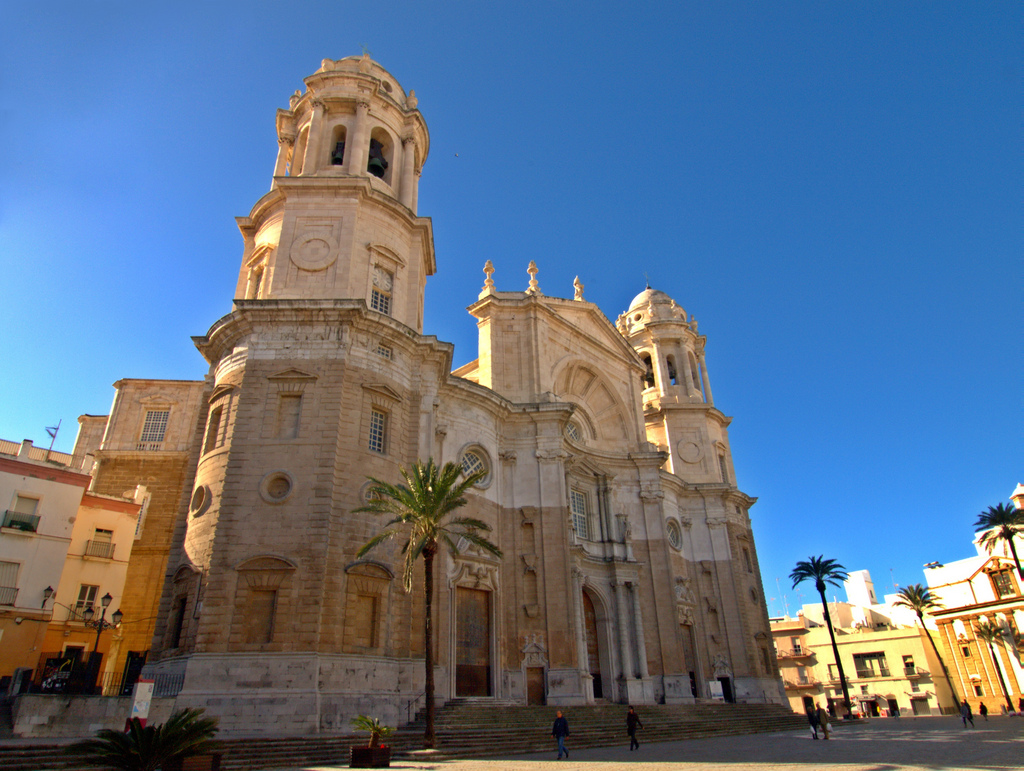
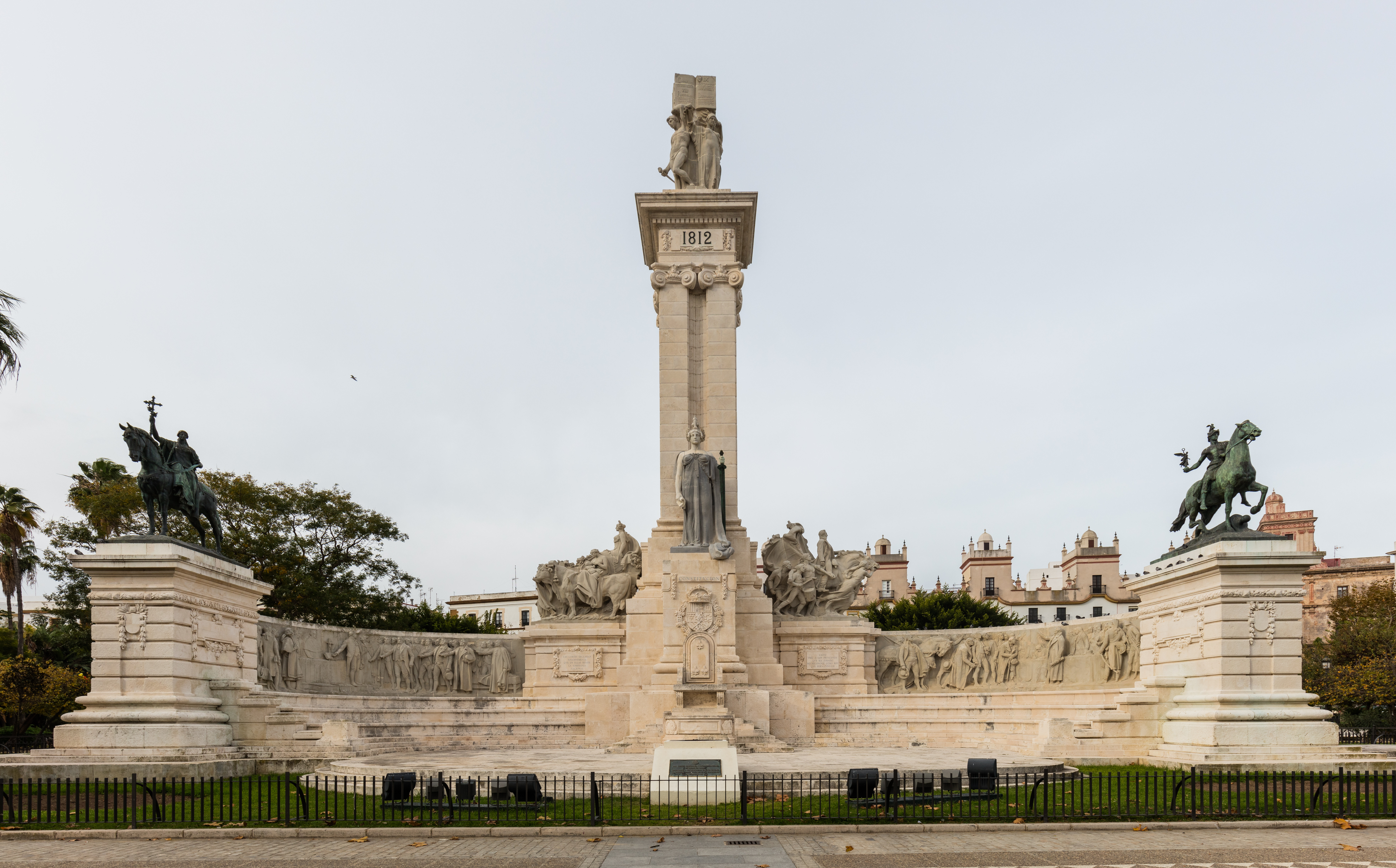
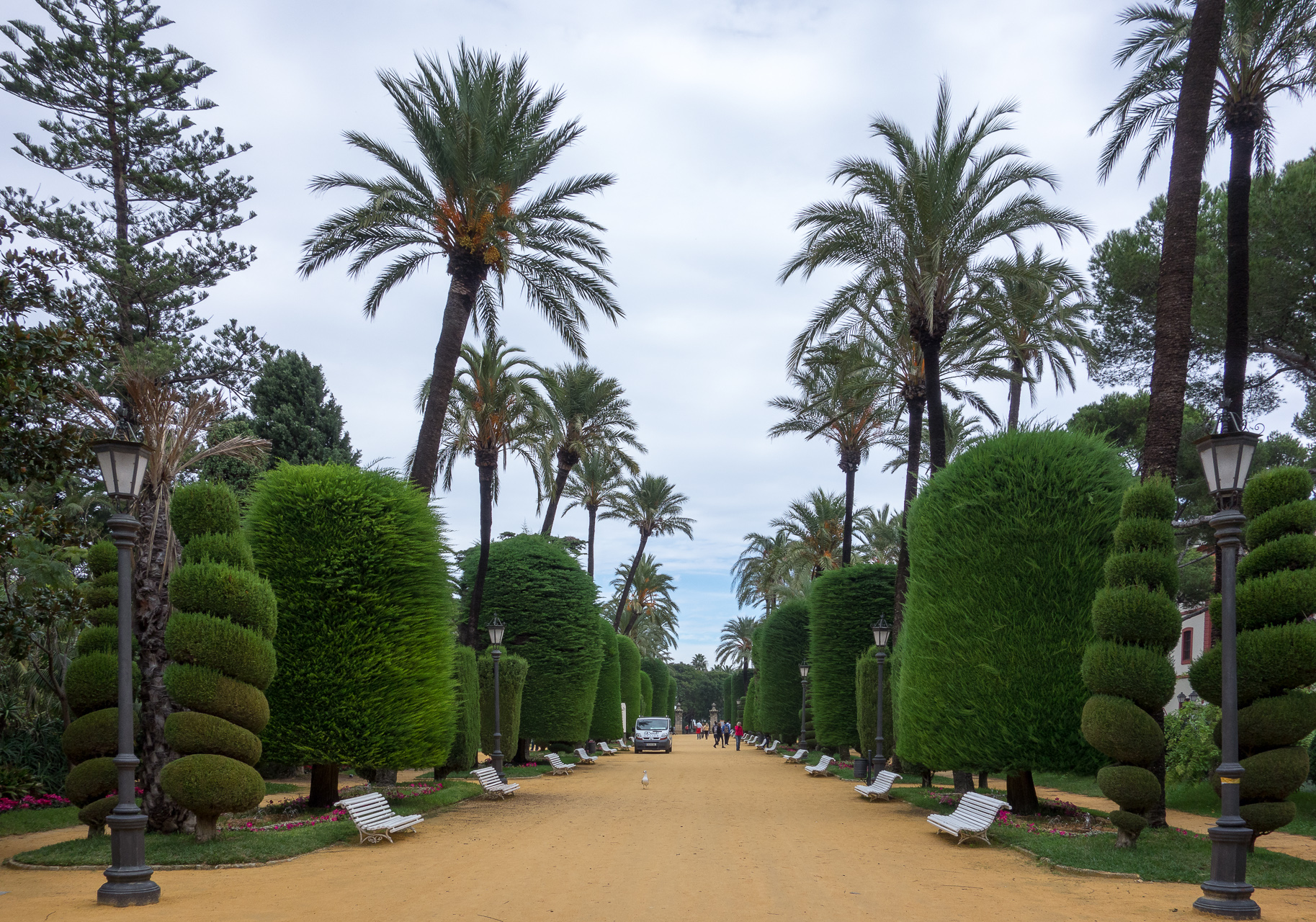
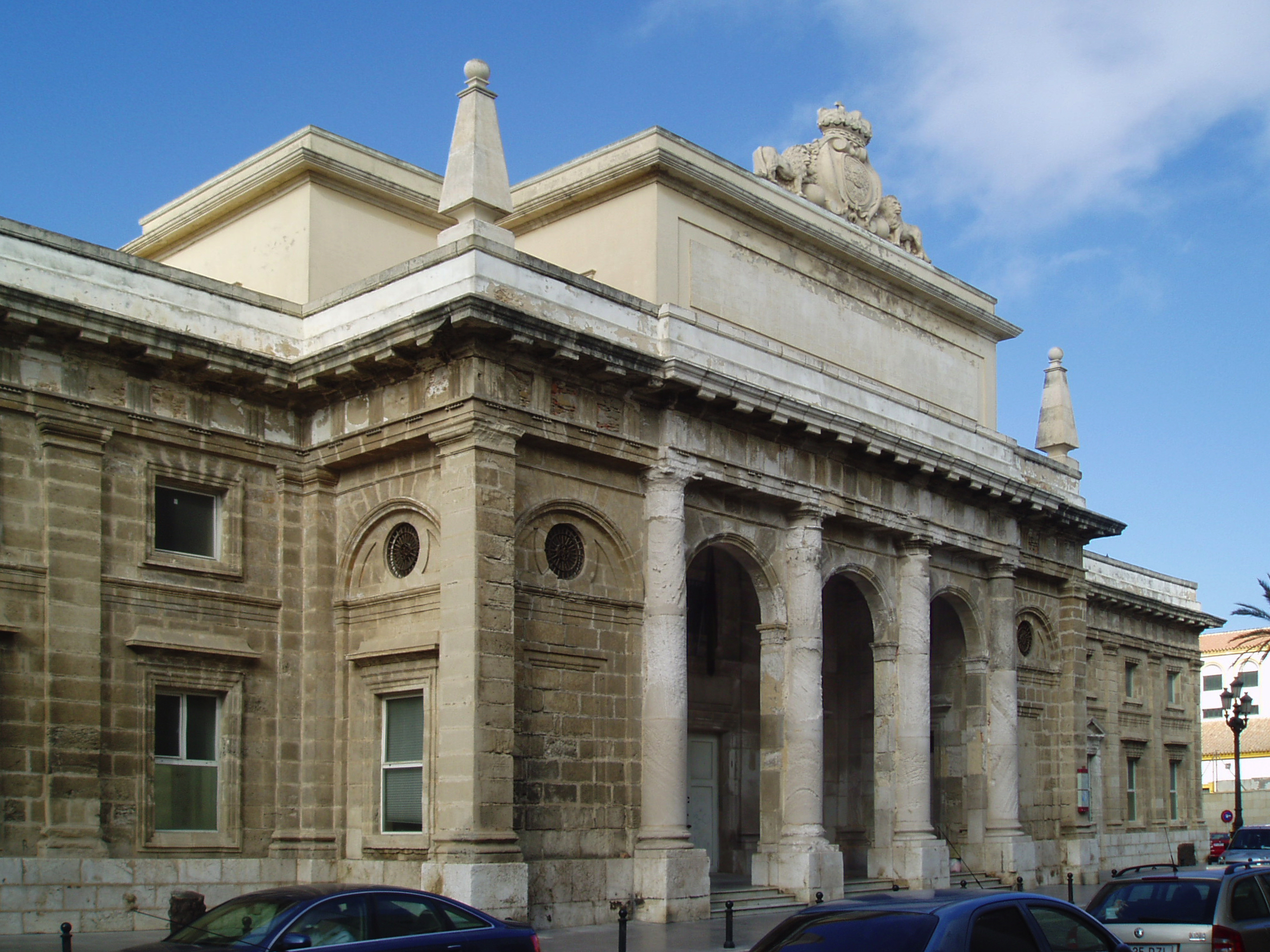
- Aerial view of Cádiz Cádiz Cathedral Monument to the Constitution of 1812 Parque Genovés Cárcel Real

- Flag Coat of arms
- Interactive map of Cádiz
- Coordinates: 36°32′06″N 06°17′51″W
- Country: Spain
- Region: Andalusia
- Province: Cádiz
- County: Bay of Cádiz
- First settled: c. 1100 BC

Government
  - Type: Ayuntamiento
  - Body: Ayuntamiento de Cádiz
  - Mayor: Bruno García (PP)

Area
  - Total: 12.10 km^{2} (4.67 sq mi)
- Elevation: 11 m (36 ft)

Population (2025-01-01)
  - Total: 109,950 ▲
  - Rank: 60th in Spain; 13th in Andalusia
  - Density: 9,087/km^{2} (23,530/sq mi)
- Demonyms: gaditano (m), gaditana (f)
- Time zone: UTC+01:00 (CET)
  - Summer (DST): UTC+02:00 (CEST)
- Postal code: 11001
- Dialing code: (+34) 956
- INE code: 11012
- Website: www.cadiz.es

Cádiz (/kəˈdɪz/ kə-DIZ, US also /ˈkeɪdɪz, ˈkæd-, ˈkɑːd-/ KAY-diz, KA(H)D-iz, Spanish: [ˈkaðiθ]) is a city in Spain and the capital of the province of Cádiz in the autonomous community of Andalusia. It is located in the southwest of the Iberian Peninsula off the Atlantic Ocean separated from neighbouring San Fernando by a narrow isthmus. One of the oldest continuously inhabited cities in Western Europe, Cádiz was founded by the Phoenicians as a trading post. In the 18th century, the port in the Bay of Cádiz consolidated itself as the main harbour of mainland Spain during the Spanish Empire, enjoying the virtual monopoly of trade with the Americas until 1778. It is also the site of the University of Cádiz.

Situated on a narrow slice of land surrounded by the sea, Cádiz is, in most respects, a typical Andalusian city with well-preserved historical landmarks. The older part of Cádiz, within the remnants of the city walls, is commonly referred to as the Old Town (Spanish: Casco Antiguo), and represents a large area of the total size of the city. It is characterized by the antiquity of its various quarters (barrios), among them El Pópulo, La Viña, and Santa María, which present a marked contrast to the newer areas of town. While the Old City's street plan consists of narrow winding alleys connecting large plazas, newer areas of Cádiz typically have wide avenues and more modern buildings. The city is dotted with parks where exotic plants flourish, including giant trees supposedly brought to the Iberian Peninsula from the New World. This includes the historic Parque Genovés.

== Names and etymology ==
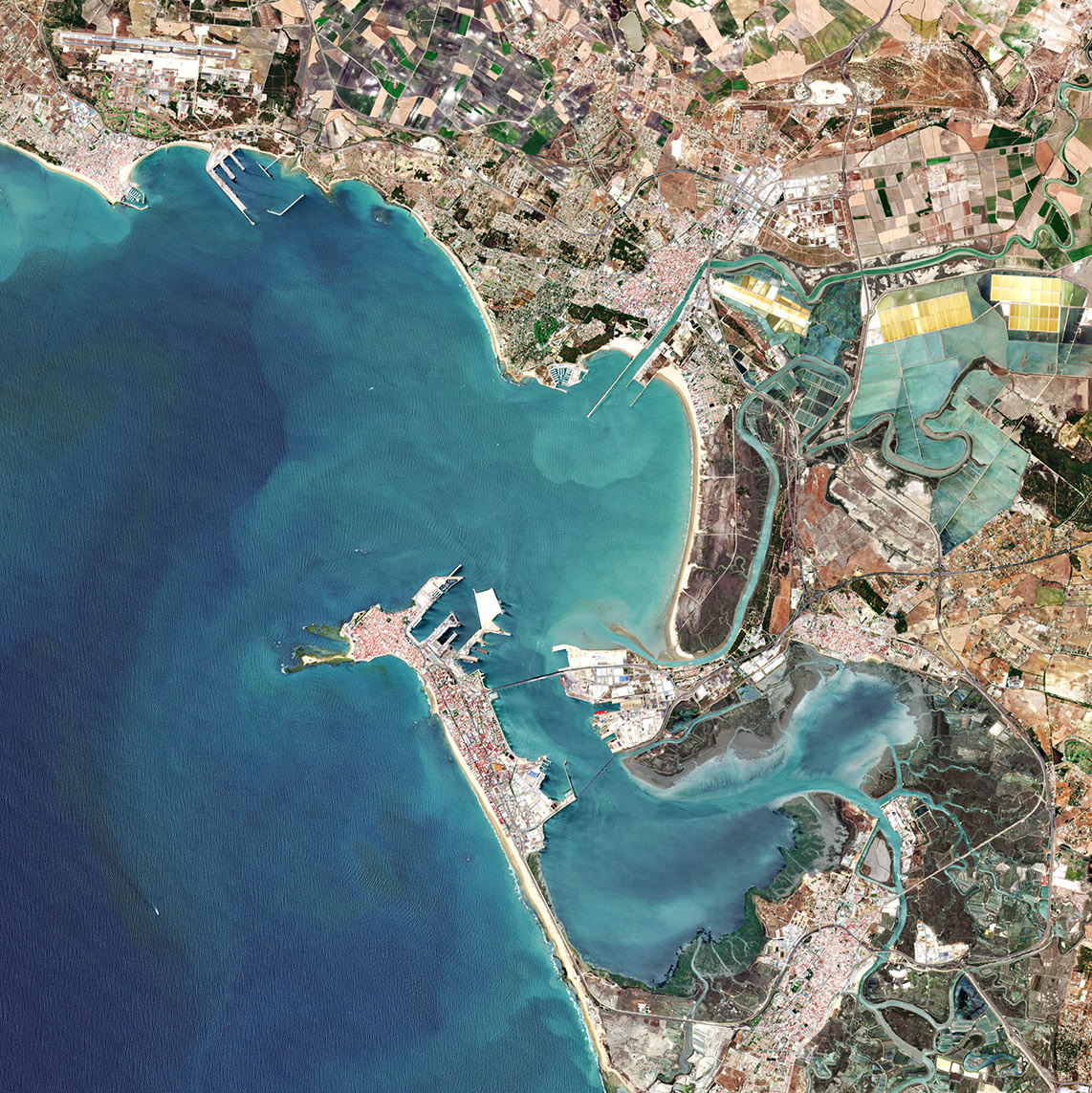
Satellite view of the Bay of Cádiz

Numismatic inscriptions in the Phoenician language record that the Phoenicians knew the site as a Gadir or Agadir (Phoenician: 𐤀𐤂𐤃𐤓, ʾgdr), meaning 'wall', 'compound', or (by metonymy) 'stronghold'. Borrowed by the Berber languages, this became the agadir (Tamazight for 'wall' and Shilha for 'fortified granary') common in North African place names, such as that of the Moroccan city of Agadir. The Carthaginians continued to use this name and all subsequent names have derived from it.

Attic Greek sources hellenized Gadir as tà Gádeira (Ancient Greek: τὰ Γάδειρα), which is neuter plural. Herodotus, using Ionic Greek, transcribed it a little differently, as Gḗdeira (Γήδειρα). Rarely, as in Stephanus of Byzantium's notes on the writings of Eratosthenes, is the name given in the feminine singular form as hè Gadeíra (ἡ Γαδείρα).

In Latin, the city was known as Gādēs and its Roman colony as Augusta Urbs Iulia Gaditana ('The August City of Julia of Cádiz'). In Arabic, the Latin name became Qādis (Arabic: قادس), from which the Spanish Cádiz derives. The Spanish demonym for people and things from Cádiz is gaditano.

The same root also gives the modern Italian Càdice, Catalan Cadis, Portuguese Cádis, and French Cadix, the last also appearing in many English sources before the 20th century.

The name Cales, which usually refers to Calais in France, is also used for Cádiz, especially in the context of the 1596 Capture of Cádiz by the British and Dutch, as Thomas Percy notes in his introduction of the ballad "The Winning of Cales" (and it is also found in the sarcastic rhyme beginning "A gentleman of Wales, a knight of Cales").

In English, the name Cádiz, traditionally spelt without the acute accent mark on the a, is pronounced variously. When the accent is on the second syllable, it is usually pronounced /kəˈdɪz/ but, when the accent is on the first syllable, it may be pronounced as /ˈkeɪdɪz/, /ˈkɑːdɪz/, /ˈkædɪz/, and similar, typically in American English. In Spanish, the accent is always, as according to the spelling, on the first syllable but, while the usual pronunciation in Spain is [ˈkaðiθ], the local dialect says [ˈkaði] or even [ˈka.i] instead.

== History ==
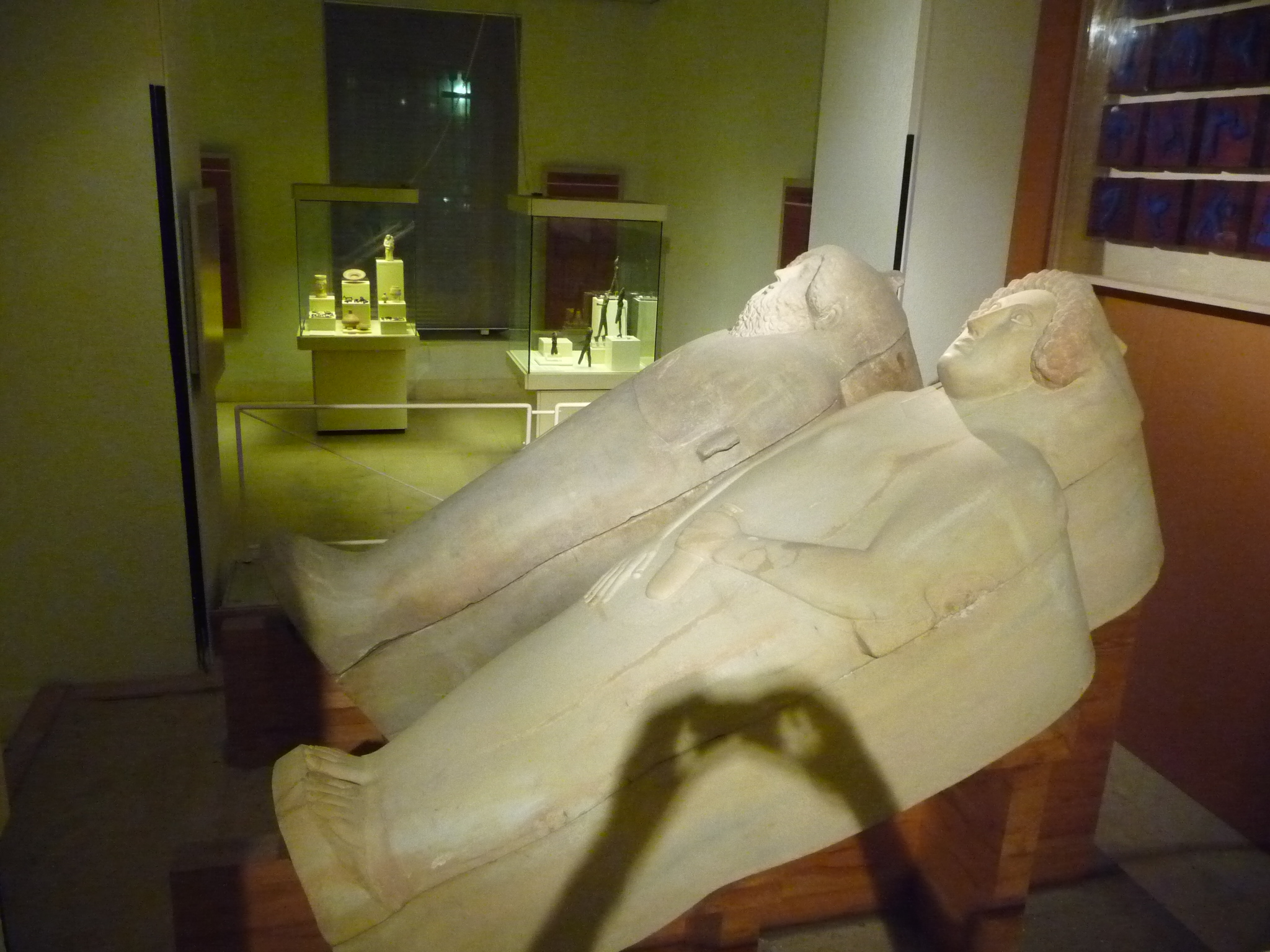
Phoenician sarcophagi (400–470 BC) found in Cádiz, thought to have been imported from the Phoenician homeland around Sidon (now in the Museum of Cádiz)

=== Foundation and early history under the Phoenicians ===
Founded as Gadir or Agadir by Phoenicians from Tyre, Cádiz is often regarded as the most ancient city still standing in Western Europe. The city was an important trading hub founded to access different metals including gold, tin, and especially silver. The Phoenicians established a port in the 7th century BC.

Traditionally, Cádiz's founding is dated to c. 1100 BC, although no archaeological strata on the site can be dated earlier than the 9th century BC. One resolution for this discrepancy has been to assume that Gadir was merely a small seasonal trading post in its earliest days.

Ancient Gadir occupied two small islands—Erytheia, primarily a settlement, and Kotinoussa, hosting cemeteries and sanctuaries outside the urban area—situated near the mouth of River Guadalete. Presently, these islands are interconnected. While the ancient ruins of Gadir beneath modern Cádiz's historical center remain largely unexcavated, excavations have been carried out in the southern cemeteries.

By the 6th century BC, disturbances within Phoenicia itself, notably the fall of Tyre to the Babylonians (573 BC), led to the end of Phoenician control over southern Iberia. This vacuum was later filled by ancient Carthage, which rose as a predominant power in the region during subsequent eras.

=== Part of the Carthaginian Empire ===
The expeditions of Himilco around Spain and France and of Hanno around Western Africa began there. The Phoenician settlement traded with Tartessos, a city-state whose exact location remains unknown but is thought to have been somewhere near the mouth of the Guadalquivir River.

One of the city's notable features during antiquity was the temple on the south end of its island dedicated to the Phoenician god Melqart, who was conflated with Hercules by the Greeks and Romans under the names "Tyrian Hercules" and "Hercules Gaditanus". It had an oracle and was famed for its wealth. In Greek mythology, Hercules was sometimes credited with founding Gadeira after performing his tenth labor, the slaying of Geryon, a monster with three heads and torsos joined to a single pair of legs. (A tumulus near Gadeira was associated with Geryon's final resting-place.) According to the Life of Apollonius of Tyana, the "Heracleum" (i.e., the temple of Melqart) was still standing during the 1st century. Some historians, based in part on this source, believe that the columns of this temple were the origin of the myth of the "pillars of Hercules".

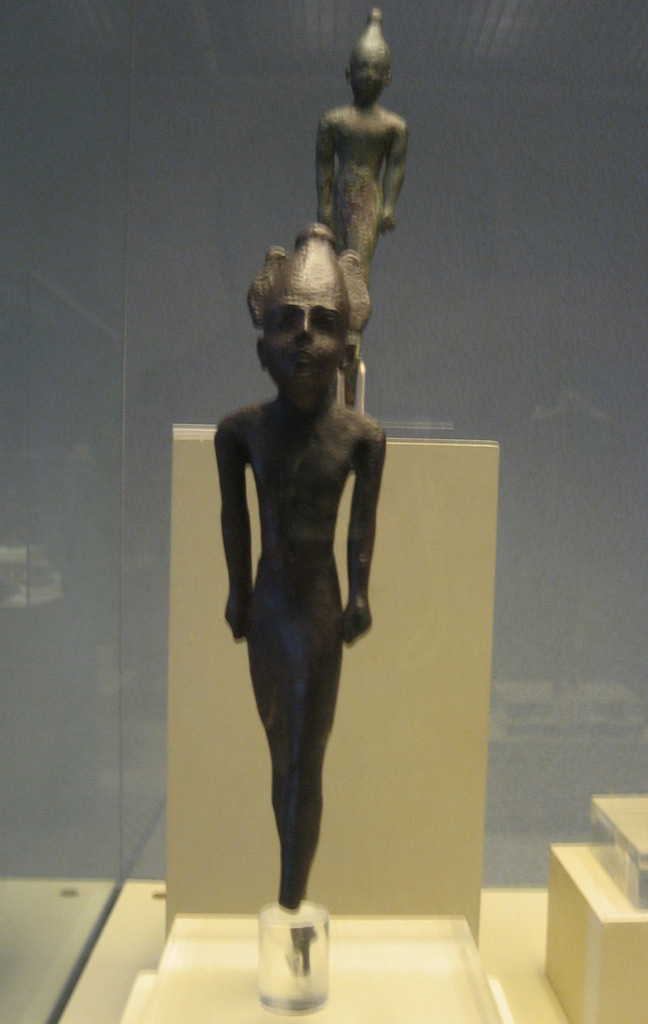
Votive statues of Melqart-Hercules from the Islote de Sancti Petri

The city fell under the sway of Carthage during Hamilcar Barca's Iberian campaign after the First Punic War. Cádiz became a depot for Hannibal's conquest of southern Iberia, and he sacrificed there to Hercules/Melqart before setting off on his famous journey in 218 BC to cross the Alps and invade Italy. Later the city fell to Romans under Scipio Africanus in 206 BC.

=== Under Rome's rule ===
Under the Roman Republic and Empire, the city flourished as a port and naval base known as Gades. Suetonius relates how Julius Caesar, when visiting Gades as a quaestor (junior senator), saw a statue of Alexander the Great there and was saddened to think that he himself, though the same age, had still achieved nothing memorable.

The Bay of Cádiz in antiquity featuring a notably different coastline.

The people of Gades had an alliance with Rome and Julius Caesar bestowed Roman citizenship on all its inhabitants in 49 BC. By the time of Augustus's census, Cádiz was home to more than five hundred equites (members of the wealthy upper class), a concentration rivaled only by Patavium (Padua) and Rome itself. It was the principal city of the Roman colony of Augusta Urbs Julia Gaditana. An aqueduct provided fresh water to the town, the island's supply being poor, running across open sea for its last leg. However, Roman Gades was never very large. It consisted only of the northwest corner of the present island, and most of its wealthy citizens maintained estates outside of it on the nearby island or on the mainland. The lifestyle maintained on the estates led to the Gaditan dancing girls (the puellae gaditanae) becoming famous throughout the ancient world.

Although it is not in fact the most westerly city in the Spanish peninsula, for the Romans Cádiz had that reputation. The poet Juvenal begins his famous tenth satire with the words: Omnibus in terris quae sunt a Gadibus usque Auroram et Gangen ('In all the lands which exist from Gades as far as Dawn and the Ganges ...').

=== Switching hands in later antiquity ===
The overthrow of Roman power in Hispania Baetica by the Visigoths in the AD 400s saw the destruction of the original city, of which few traces remain today. The site was later reconquered by Justinian in 551 as part of the Byzantine province of Spania. It would remain Byzantine until Leovigild's reconquest in 572 returned it to the Visigothic Kingdom.

=== Al-Andalus ===
Under Moorish rule between 711 and 1262, the city was called Qādis, whence the modern Spanish name was derived. A famous Muslim legend developed concerning an "idol" (sanam Qādis) over 100 cubits tall on the outskirts of Cádiz whose magic blocked the strait of Gibraltar with contrary winds and currents; its destruction by Abd-al-Mumin c. 1145 supposedly permitted ships to sail through the strait once more. It also appeared (as Salamcadis) in the 12th-century Pseudo-Turpin's history of Charlemagne, where it was considered a statue of Muhammad and thought to warn the Muslims of Christian invasion. Classical sources are entirely silent on such a structure, but it has been conjectured that the origin of the legend was the ruins of a navigational aid constructed in late antiquity. Abd-al-Mumin (or Admiral Ali ibn-Isa ibn-Maymun) found that the idol was gilded bronze rather than pure gold, but coined what there was to help fund his revolt. In 1217, according to the De itinere Frisonum the city was raided by a group of Frisian crusaders en route to the Holy Land who burned it and destroyed its congregational mosque. The Moors were ousted by Alphonso X of Castile in 1262.

Historically, there was a Jewish community living in Cádiz under Muslim rule.

=== Post-1492 ===
During the Age of Exploration, the city experienced a renaissance. Christopher Columbus sailed from Cádiz on his second and fourth voyages and the city later became the home port of the Spanish treasure fleet. Consequently, it became a major target of Spain's enemies. The 16th century saw a series of failed raids by Barbary corsairs; the greater part of the old town was consumed in a major fire in 1569; and in April 1587 a raid by the Englishman Francis Drake occupied the harbor for three days, captured six ships, and destroyed 31 others (an event which became known in England as the Singeing the King of Spain's Beard. The attack delayed the sailing of the Spanish Armada by a year.

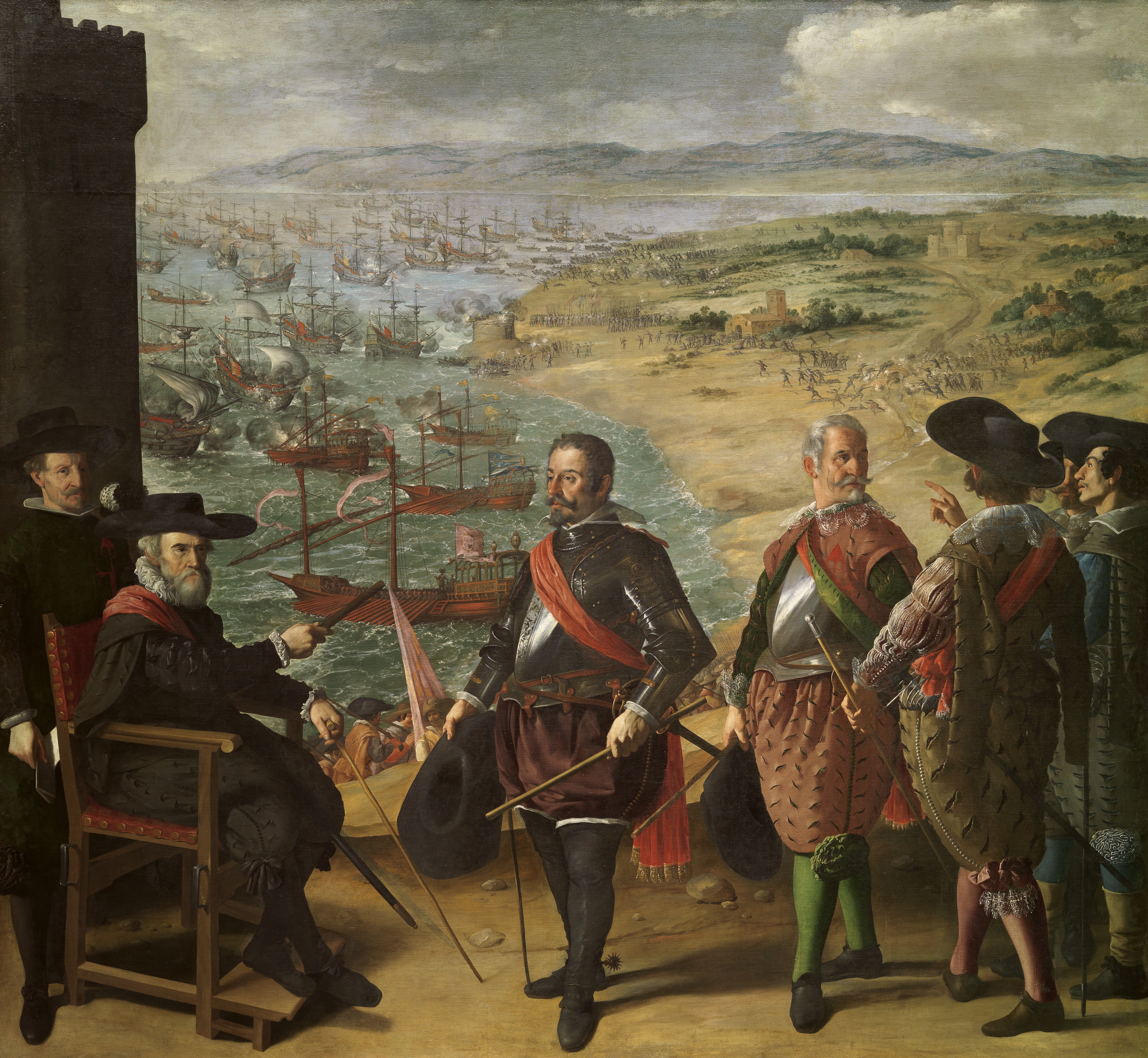
Defense of Cádiz against the English, by Francisco de Zurbarán, 1634 (Prado Museum, Madrid)

The city suffered a still more serious attack in 1596, when it was captured by an Anglo-Dutch fleet, this time under the Earls of Essex and Nottingham. Thirty-two Spanish ships were destroyed and the city was captured, looted and occupied for almost a month. Finally, when the royal authorities refused to pay a ransom demanded by the English for returning the city intact, they burned much of it before leaving with their booty. A third English raid was mounted against the city in 1625 by George Villiers, 1st Duke of Buckingham, and Edward Cecil, but the attempt was unsuccessful. During the Anglo-Spanish War, Admiral Robert Blake blockaded Cádiz from 1655 to 1657. In the 1702 Battle of Cádiz, the English attacked again under George Rooke and James Butler, 2nd Duke of Ormonde, but they were repelled after a costly siege.

In the 18th century, the sand bars of the Guadalquivir forced the Spanish government to transfer its American trade from Seville to Cádiz, which now commanded better access to the Atlantic. Although the empire itself was declining, Cádiz now experienced another golden age because of its new importance, and many of today's historic buildings in the Old City date from this era. It became one of Spain's greatest and most cosmopolitan cities and home to trading communities from many countries, chief among which were the French and Anglo-Irish. Irish Catholics were prohibited by the penal laws from owning land or entering a profession in Ireland, whereas in Spain they were as Catholics permitted to trade more freely than the English.

On 12 October 1778, the right to trade with the Americas was expanded to most ports of mainland Spain, bringing the monopoly of trade hitherto enjoyed by the Port of the Bay of Cádiz to an end.

During the Napoleonic Wars, Cádiz was blockaded by the British from 1797 until the Peace of Amiens in 1802 and again from 1803 until the outbreak of the Peninsular War in 1808. In that war, it was one of the few Spanish cities to hold out against the invading French and their candidate Joseph Bonaparte. Cádiz then became the seat of Spain's military high command and Cortes (parliament) for the duration of the war. It was here that the liberal Spanish Constitution of 1812 was proclaimed. The citizens revolted in 1820 to secure a renewal of this constitution and the revolution spread successfully until Ferdinand VII was imprisoned in Cádiz. French forces secured the release of Ferdinand in the 1823 Battle of Trocadero and suppressed liberalism for a time. In 1868, Cádiz was once again the seat of a revolution, resulting in the eventual abdication and exile of Queen Isabella II. The Cortes of Cádiz decided to reinstate the monarchy under King Amadeo just two years later.

In recent years, the city has undergone much reconstruction. Many monuments, cathedrals, and landmarks have been cleaned and restored.

== Diocese ==
The diocese of Cádiz and Ceuta is a suffragan of the Roman Catholic Archdiocese of Seville; that is, it is a diocese within the metropolitan see of Seville. It became a diocese in 1263 after its Reconquista (reconquest) from the Moors. By the Concordat of 1753, in which the Spanish crown also gained the rights to make appointments to church offices and to tax church lands, the Diocese of Cádiz was merged with the Diocese of Ceuta, a Spanish enclave on the northern coast of Africa, and the diocesan bishop became, by virtue of his office, the apostolic administrator of Ceuta.

== Main sights ==
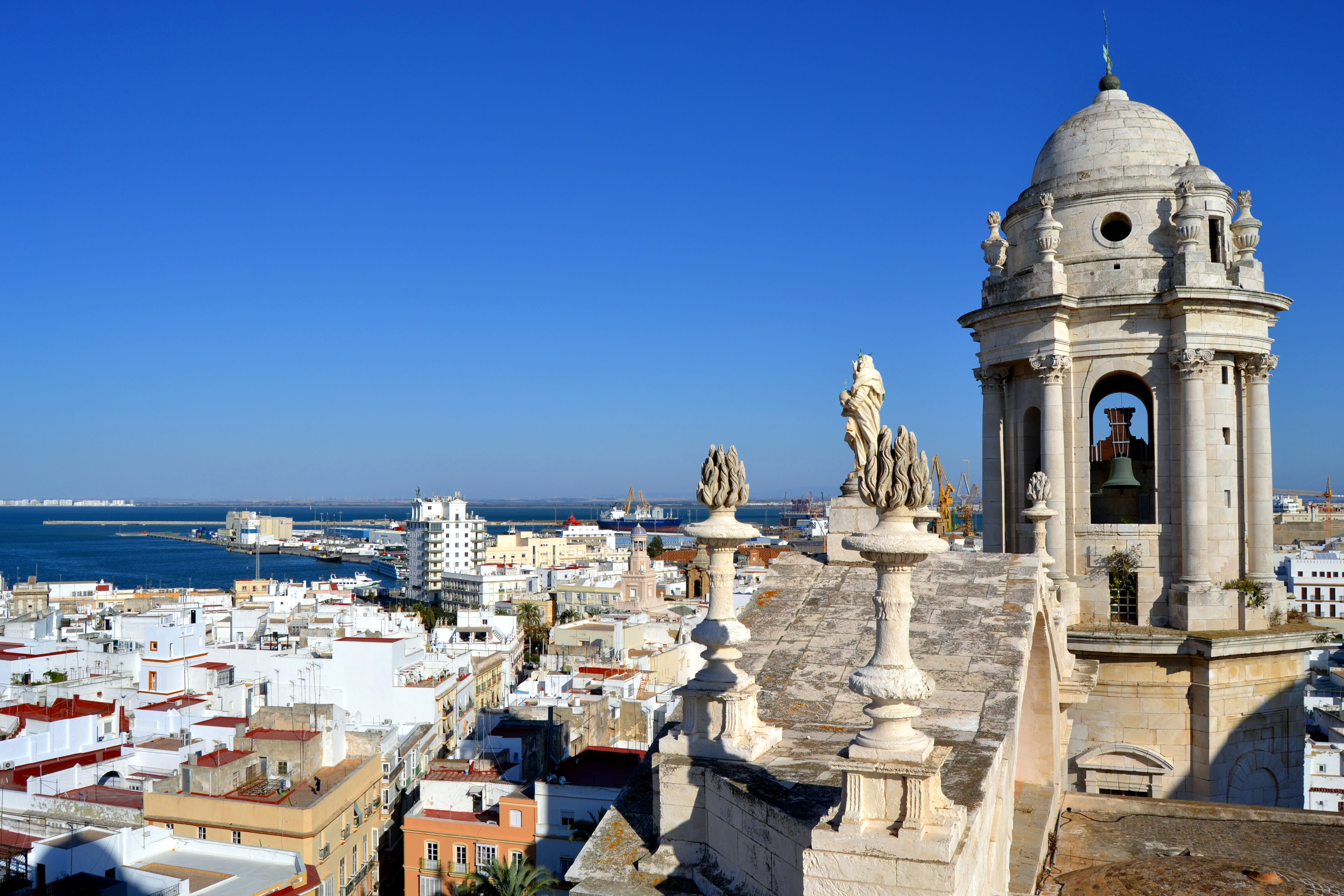
City skyline

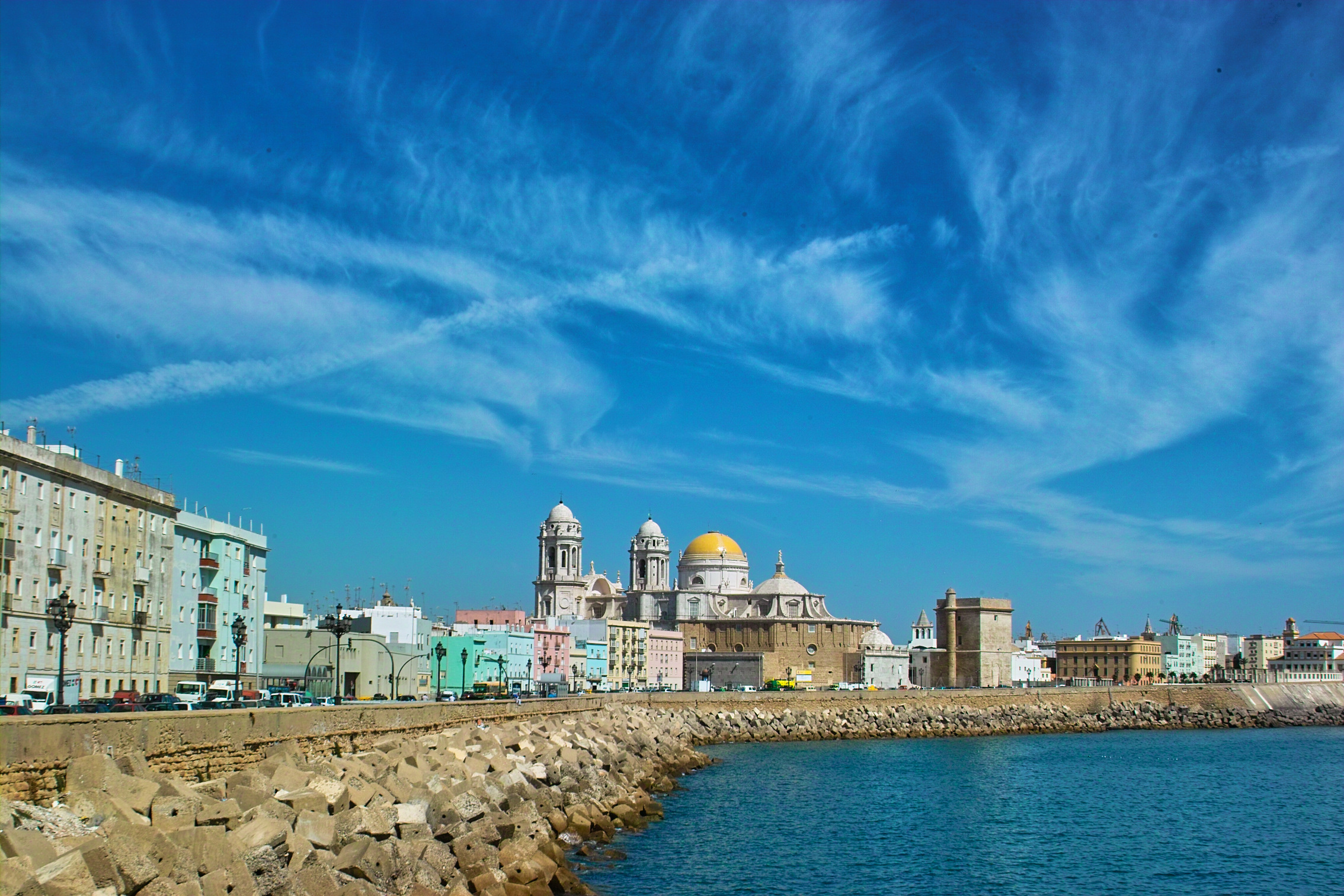
View of Cádiz, with Catedral de Cádiz, from Mirador El Vendaval

Among many landmarks of historical and scenic interest is an unusual cathedral of various architectural styles, a theater, an old municipal building, an 18th-century watchtower, a vestige of the ancient city wall, an ancient Roman theater, and electrical pylons of modern design carrying cables across the Bay of Cádiz. The old town is characterized by narrow streets connecting squares (plazas), bordered by the sea and by the city walls. Most of the landmark buildings are situated in the plazas.

=== Plazas and their landmark buildings ===
The old town of Cádiz is one of the most densely populated urban areas in Europe, and is packed with narrow streets with several plazas. These are the Plaza de Mina, Plaza San Antonio, Plaza de Candelaria, Plaza de San Juan de Dios, and Plaza de España.

==== Plaza de Mina ====
In the centre of the old town, the Plaza de Mina was developed in the first half of the 19th century. The land was previously occupied by the orchard of the convent of San Francisco. The area was converted into a plaza in 1838 by the architect Torcuato Benjumeda and (later) Juan Daura, with its trees being planted in 1861. It was then redeveloped again in 1897, and has remained virtually unchanged since that time. It is named after General Francisco Espoz y Mina, a hero of the war of independence. Manuel de Falla y Matheu was born in Number 3 Plaza de Mina, where a plaque bears his name. The plaza also contains several statues, one of these is a bust of José Macpherson (a pioneer in the development of petrography, stratigraphy and tectonics) who was born in number 12 Plaza de Mina in 1839. The Museum of Cádiz is to be found at number 5 Plaza de Mina, and contains many objects from Cádiz's 3000-year history as well as works by artists such as Peter Paul Rubens. The houses which face the plaza, many of which can be classified as neo-classical architecture or built in the style of Isabelline Gothic, were originally occupied by the Cádiz bourgeoisie.

The Plaza de la Catedral houses both the Cathedral and the Baroque church of Santiago, built in 1635.

==== Plaza de San Francisco and San Francisco Church and Convent ====
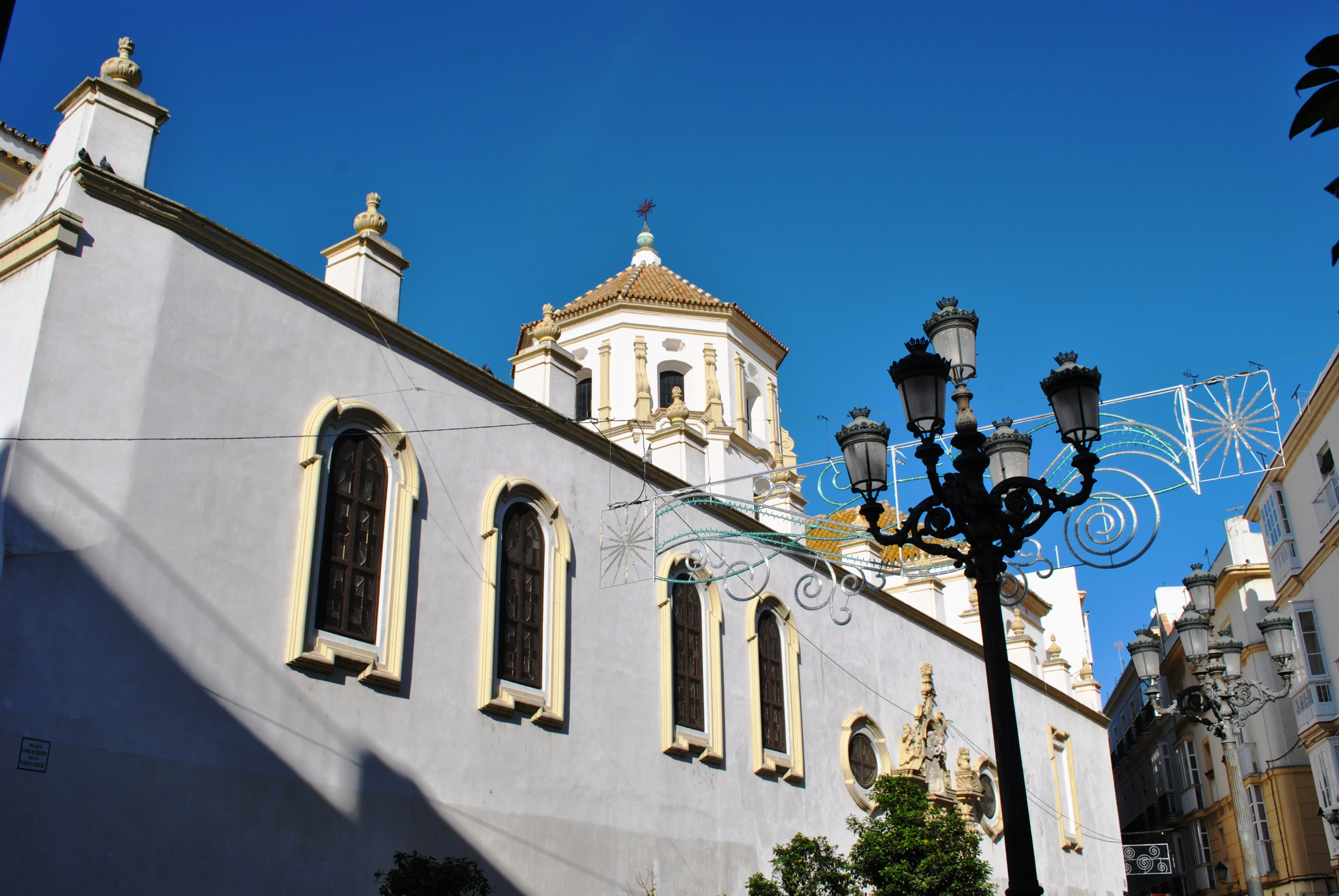
San Francisco church

Located next to Plaza de Mina, this smaller square houses the San Francisco church and convent. Originally built in 1566, it was substantially renovated in the 17th century, when its cloisters were added. Originally, the Plaza de Mina formed the convent's orchard.

==== Plaza San Antonio ====
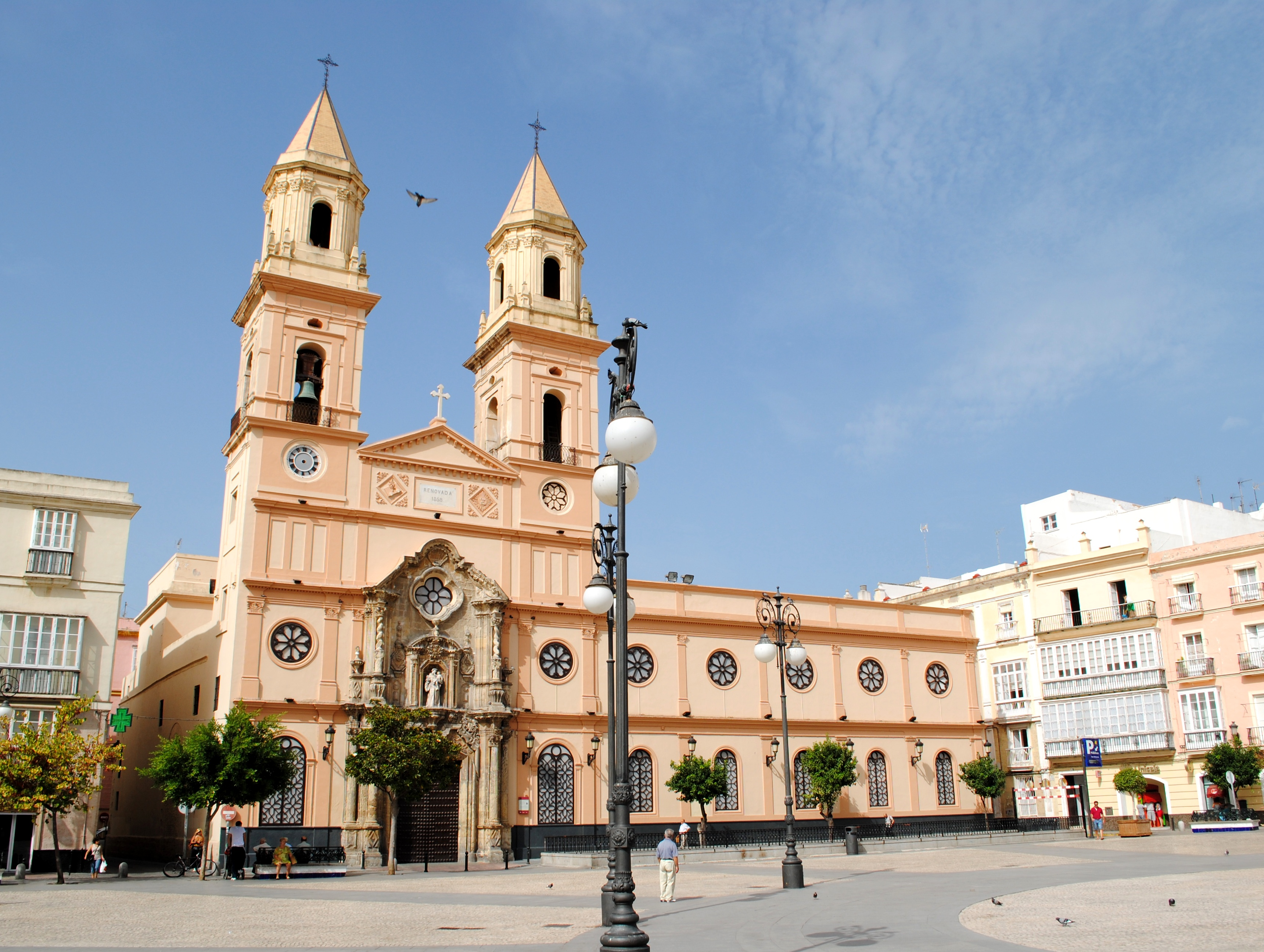
Plaza de San Antonio and church

In the 19th century Plaza San Antonio was considered to be Cádiz's main square. The square is surrounded by a number of mansions built in neo-classical architecture or Isabelline Gothic style, once occupied by the Cádiz upper classes. San Antonio church, originally built in 1669, is also situated in the plaza.

The plaza was built in the 18th century, and on 19 March 1812 the Spanish Constitution of 1812 was proclaimed here, leading to the plaza being named Plaza de la Constitución, and then later Plaza San Antonio, after the hermit San Antonio.

In 1954 the city's mayor proclaimed the location a historic site. All construction is prohibited.

==== Plaza de Candelaria ====
The Plaza de Candelaria is named after the Candelaria convent, situated in the square until it was demolished in 1873 under the First Spanish Republic, when its grounds were redeveloped as a plaza. The plaza is notable for a statue in its centre of Emilio Castelar, president of the first Spanish republic, who was born in a house facing the square. A plaque situated on another house, states that Bernardo O'Higgins, an Irish-Chilean adventurer and former dictator of Chile, also lived in the square.

==== Plaza de la Catedral and the Cathedral ====
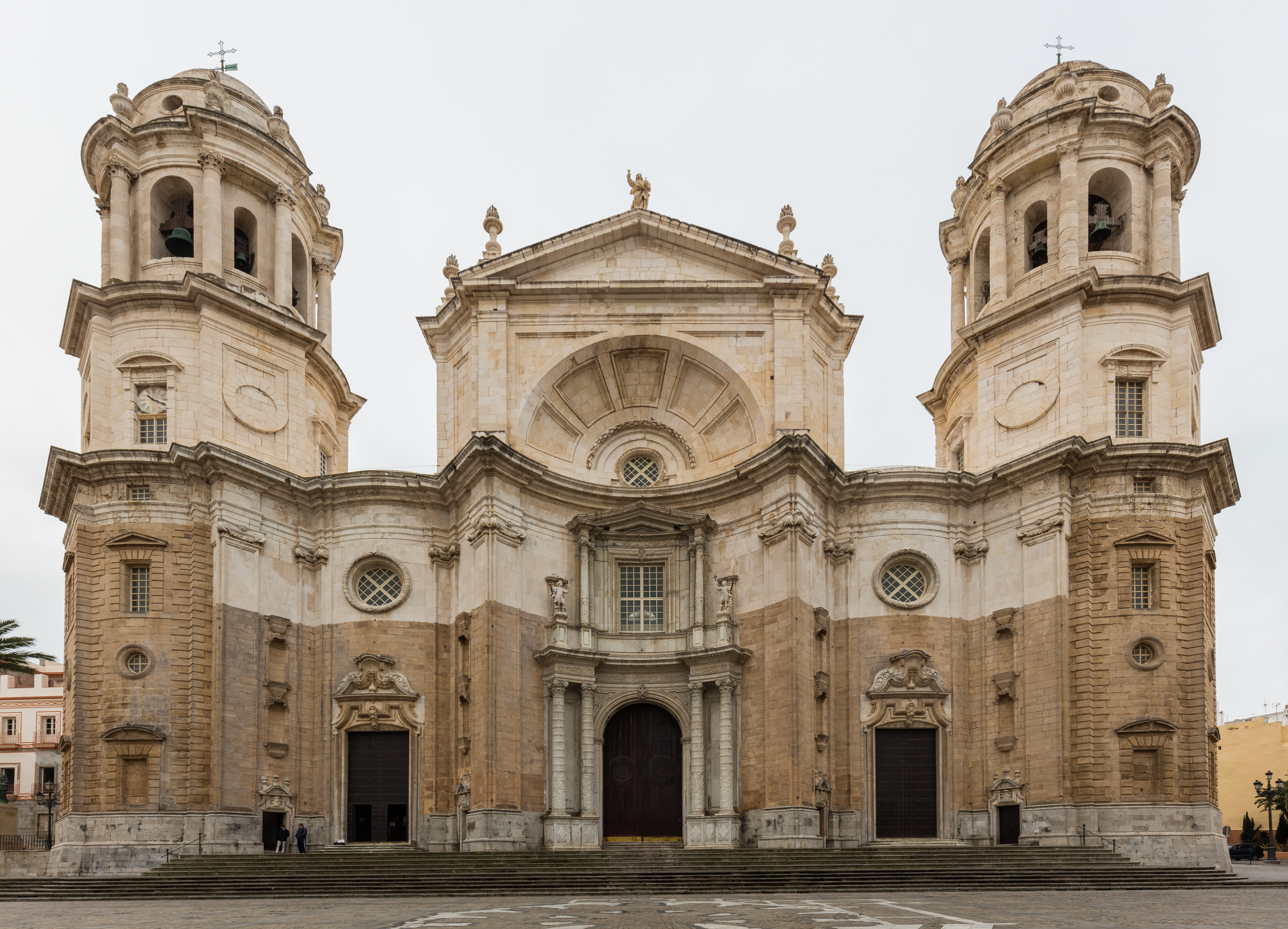
Cádiz Cathedral

One of Cádiz's most famous landmarks is its cathedral. Unlike in many places, the Cathedral of Cádiz, known locally as the "New Cathedral," is officially the Cathedral de "Santa Cruz sobre el mar" or "Santa Cruz sobre las Aguas". It was not built on the site of the original Cathedral de Santa Cruz. The latter was completed in 1263 at the behest of Alfonso X, and burned in the Anglo-Dutch attack on the city in 1596. The reconstruction of the old cathedral started in the early 17th century, but when the city became more prosperous following the move of the Casa de Contratación from Seville to Cádiz in 1717, it was felt that a grander cathedral was needed.

Work on the New Cathedral started in 1722 and was supervised by the architect Vicente Acero, who had also built the Granada Cathedral. Acero resigned from the project and was succeeded by several other architects. As a result, this largely Baroque-style cathedral was built over a period of 116 years, and, due to this drawn-out period of construction, the cathedral underwent several major changes to its original design. Though the cathedral was originally intended to be a baroque edifice with some rococo elements, it was completed in the neoclassical style. Its chapels have many paintings and relics from the old cathedral in Cádiz and as well as from monasteries throughout Spain.

==== Plaza de San Juan de Dios and the Old Town Hall ====
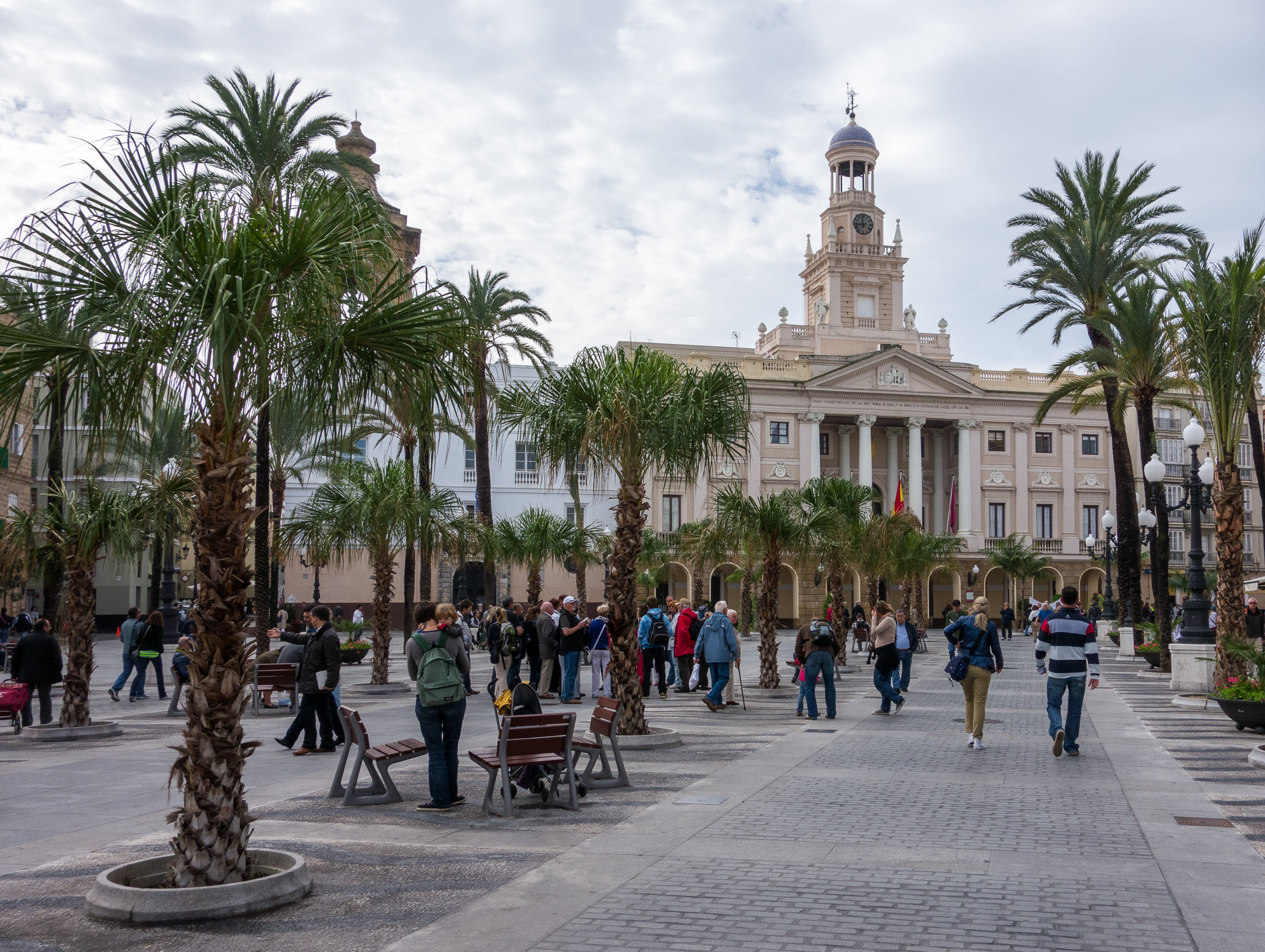
View of the Plaza de San Juan de Dios, featuring the façade of the Old Town Hall

Construction of this plaza began in the 15th century on lands reclaimed from the sea. With the demolition of the City walls in 1906 the plaza increased in size and a statue of the Cádiz politician Segismundo Moret was unveiled. Overlooking the plaza, the Ayuntamiento is the town hall of Cádiz's Old City. The structure, constructed on the bases and location of the previous Consistorial Houses (1699), was built in two stages. The first stage began in 1799 under the direction of architect Torcuato Benjumeda in the neoclassical style. The second stage was completed in 1861 under the direction of García del Alamo, in the Isabelline Gothic (Spanish: Gótico Isabelino or, simply, the Isabelino) style. Here, in 1936, the flag of Andalusia was hoisted for the first time.

==== Plaza de España and the monument to the constitution of 1812 ====
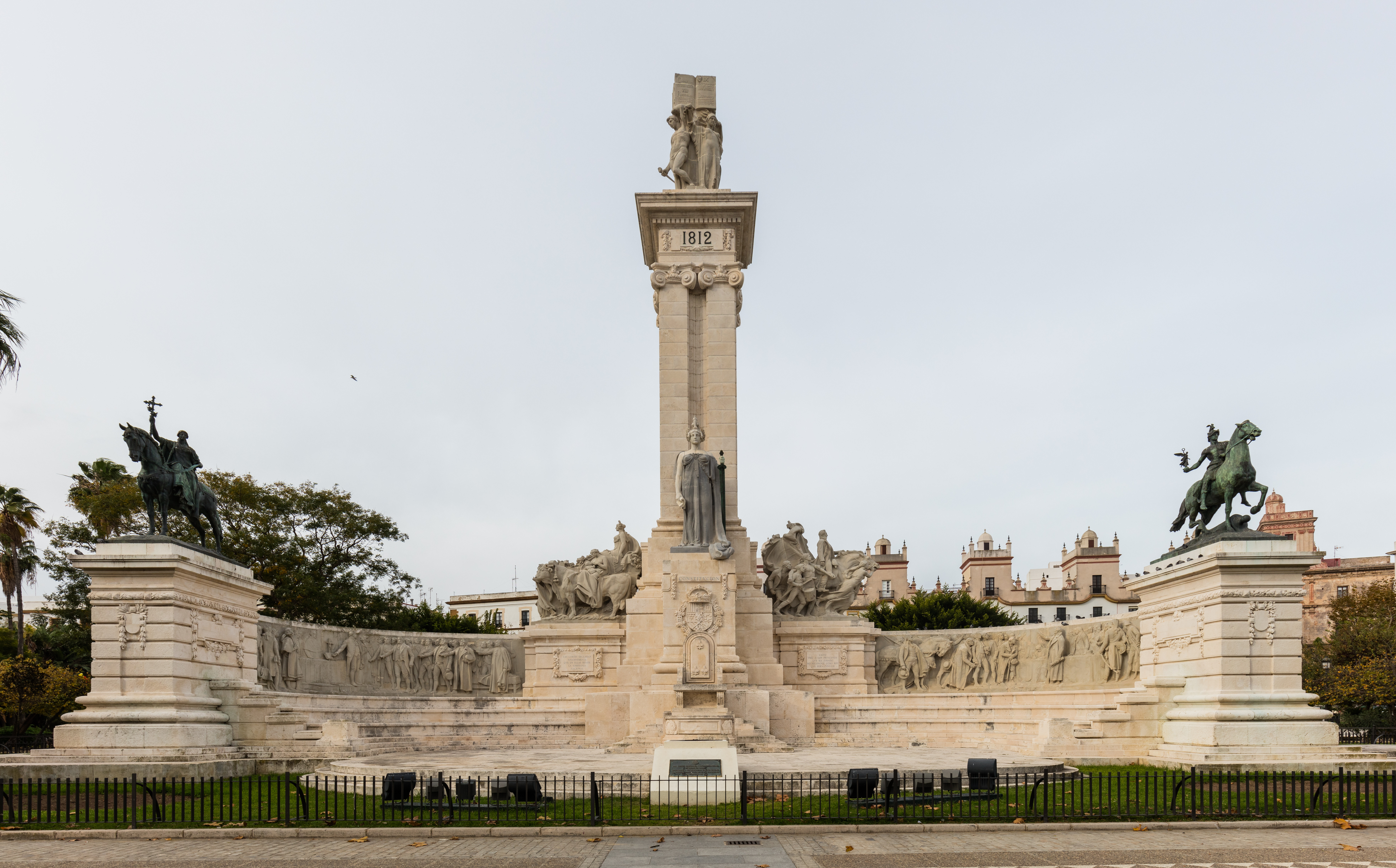
Monument to the Constitution of 1812

The Plaza de España is a large square close to the port. It is dominated by the Monument to the Constitution of 1812, which came into being as a consequence of the demolition of a portion of the old city wall. The plaza is an extension of the old Plazuela del Carbón.

The goal of this demolition was to create a grand new city square to mark the hundredth anniversary of the liberal constitution, which was proclaimed in this city in 1812, and provide a setting for a suitable memorial. The work is by the architect, Modesto Lopez Otero, and of the sculptor, Aniceto Marinas. The work began in 1912 and finished in 1929.

==== Plaza Fragela and the Gran Teatro Falla (Falla Grand Theater) ====
The original Gran Teatro was constructed in 1871 by the architect García del Alamo, and was destroyed by a fire in August 1881. The current theater was built between 1884 and 1905 over the remains of the previous Gran Teatro. The architect was Adolfo Morales de los Rios, and the overseer of construction was Juan Cabrera de la Torre. The outside was covered in red bricks and is of a neo-Mudéjar or Moorish revival style. Following renovations in the 1920s, the theater was renamed the Gran Teatro Falla, in honor of composer Manuel de Falla, who is buried in the crypt of the cathedral. After a period of disrepair in the 1980s, the theater has since undergone extensive renovation.

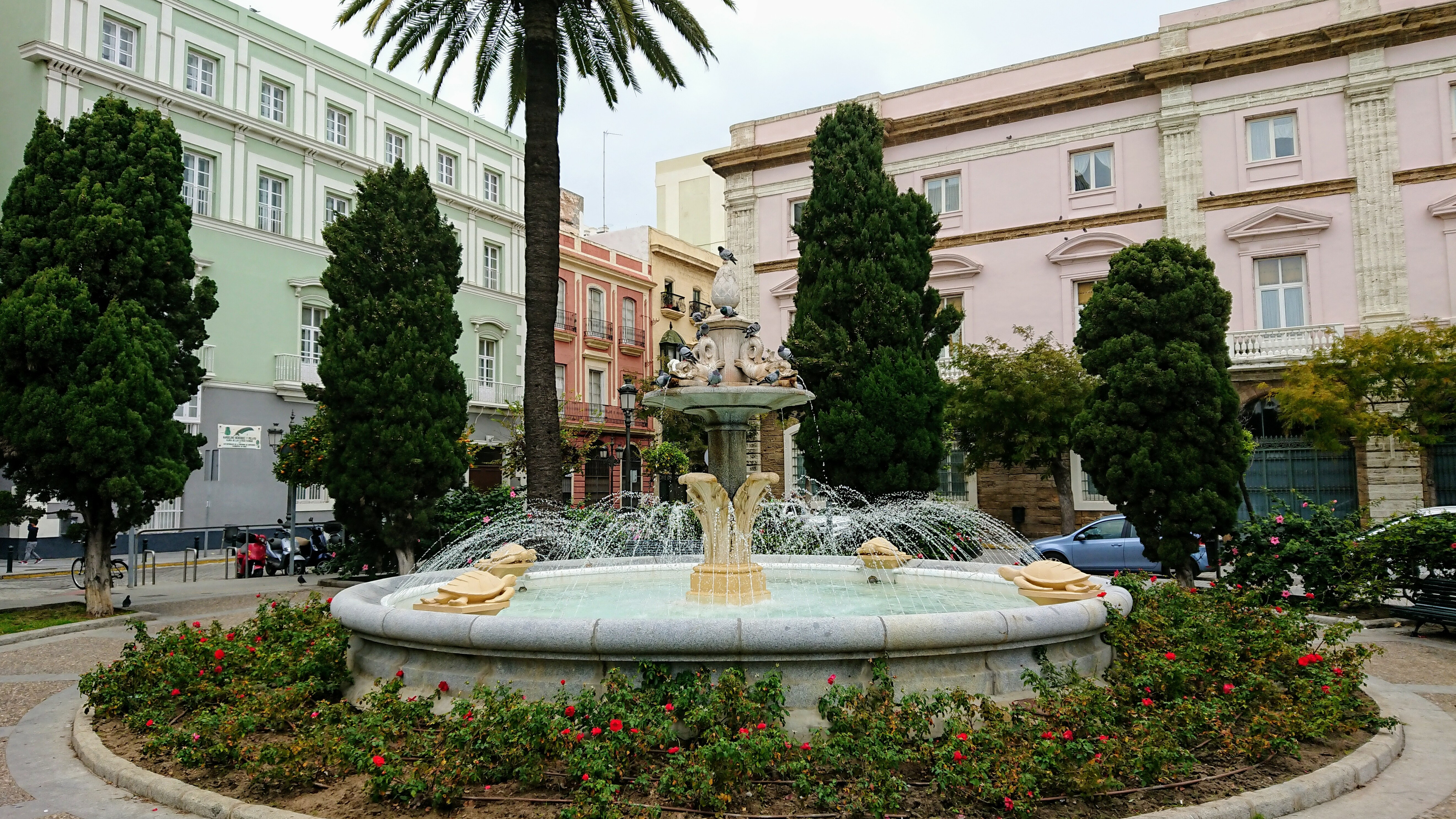
Plaza de las Tortugas

=== Other sights ===
==== Tavira tower ====
In the 18th century, Cádiz had more than 160 towers from which local merchants could look out to sea to watch for arriving merchant ships from the New World. These towers often formed part of the merchants' houses, but this particular tower was located on a high point in the city, 45 meters above sea level, and was chosen by the Navy as their official lookout in 1787 (after eliminating several other locations previously). The Torre Tavira, was named for its original watchman, Don Antonio Tavira, a lieutenant in the Spanish Navy. Today it is the tallest of the towers which still dot the Cádiz skyline. Since 1994 there is a camera obscura, a room that uses the principle of the pinhole camera and a specially prepared convex lens to project panoramic views of the Old City onto a concave disc. There are also two exhibition rooms and a rooftop terrace.

==== Admiral's House ====
The Casa del Almirante is a palatial house, adjacent to the Plaza San Martín in the Barrio del Pópulo, which was constructed in 1690 with the proceeds of the lucrative trade with the Americas. It was built by the family of the admiral of the Spanish treasure fleet, the so-called Fleet of the Indies, Don Diego de Barrios. The exterior is sheathed in exquisite red and white Genoan marble, prepared in the workshops of Andreoli, and mounted by the master, García Narváez. The colonnaded portico, the grand staircase under the cupola, and the hall on the main floor are architectural features of great nobility and beauty. The shield of the Barrios family appears on the second-floor balcony.

==== Old customs house ====
Situated within the confines of the walls which protect the flank of the port of Cádiz are three identical adjacent buildings: the Customs House, the House of Hiring and the consulate. Of the three, the former had been erected first, built in a sober neo-classical style and of ample and balanced proportions. The works began in 1765 under the direction of Juan Caballero at a cost of 7,717,200 reales.

==== Palacio de Congresos ====
Cádiz's refurbished tobacco factory offers international conference and trade-show facilities. Home to the third annual MAST Conference and trade-show (12 to 14 November 2008).

==== Pylons of Cádiz ====
The Pylons of Cádiz are electricity pylons of unusual design, one on either side of the Bay of Cádiz, used to support huge electric-power cables. The pylons are 158 meters (518 ft) high and designed for two circuits. The very unconventional construction consists of a narrow frustum steel framework with one crossbar at the top of each one for the insulators.

==== Roman theatre ====
The Roman theatre was discovered in 1980, in the El Pópulo district, after a fire had destroyed some old warehouses, revealing a layer of construction that was judged to be the foundations of some medieval buildings; the foundations of these buildings had been built, in turn, upon much more ancient stones, hand-hewn limestone of a Roman character. Systematic excavations have revealed a largely intact Roman theatre.

The theatre, constructed by order of Lucius Cornelius Balbus (minor) during the 1st century BC, is the second-largest Roman theatre in the world, surpassed only by the theatre of Pompeii, south of Rome. Cicero, in his Epistulae ad Familiares ('Letters to his friends'), wrote of its use by Balbus for personal propaganda.

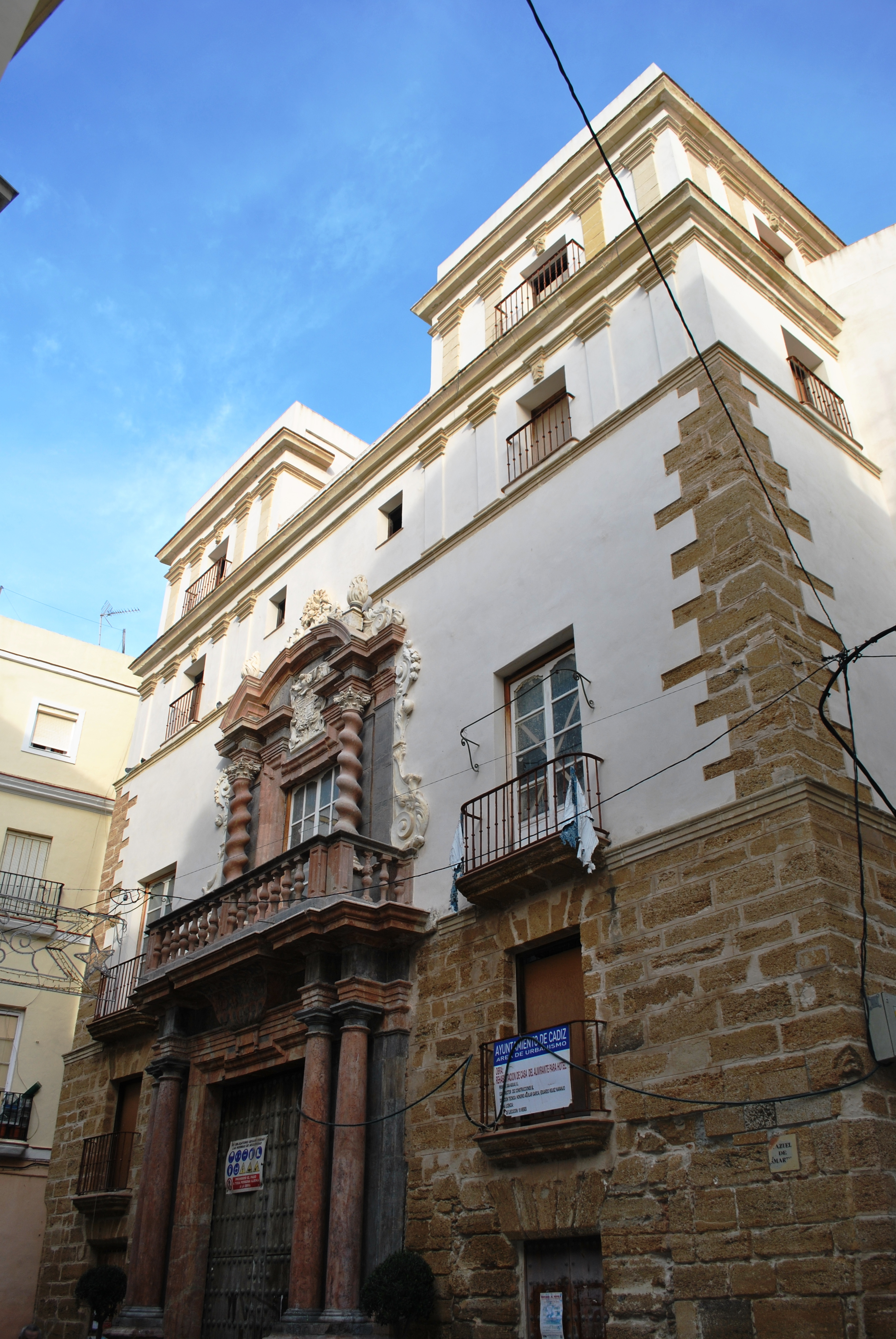
Admiral's House

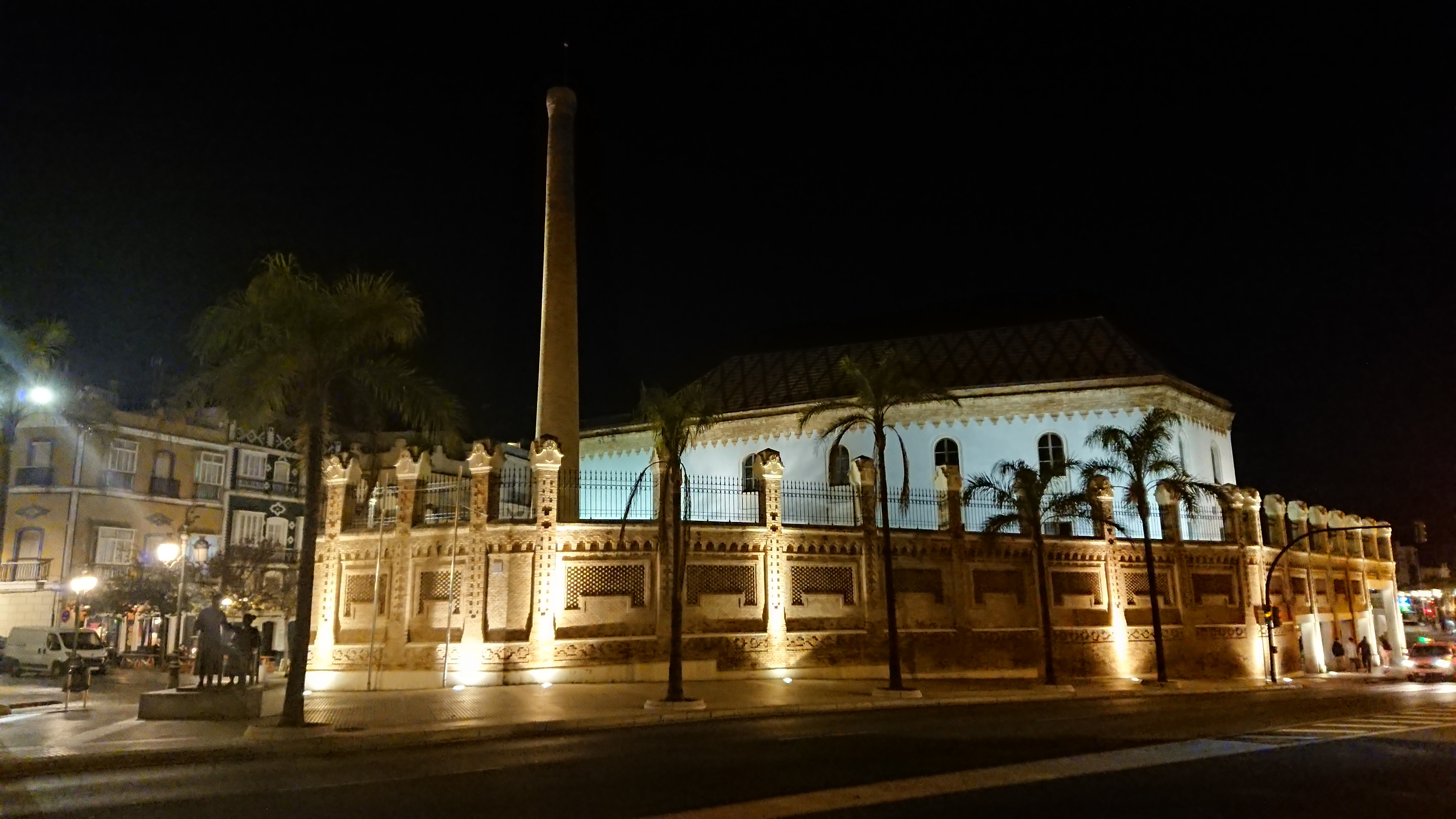
Palacio de Congresos (Old tobacco factory)

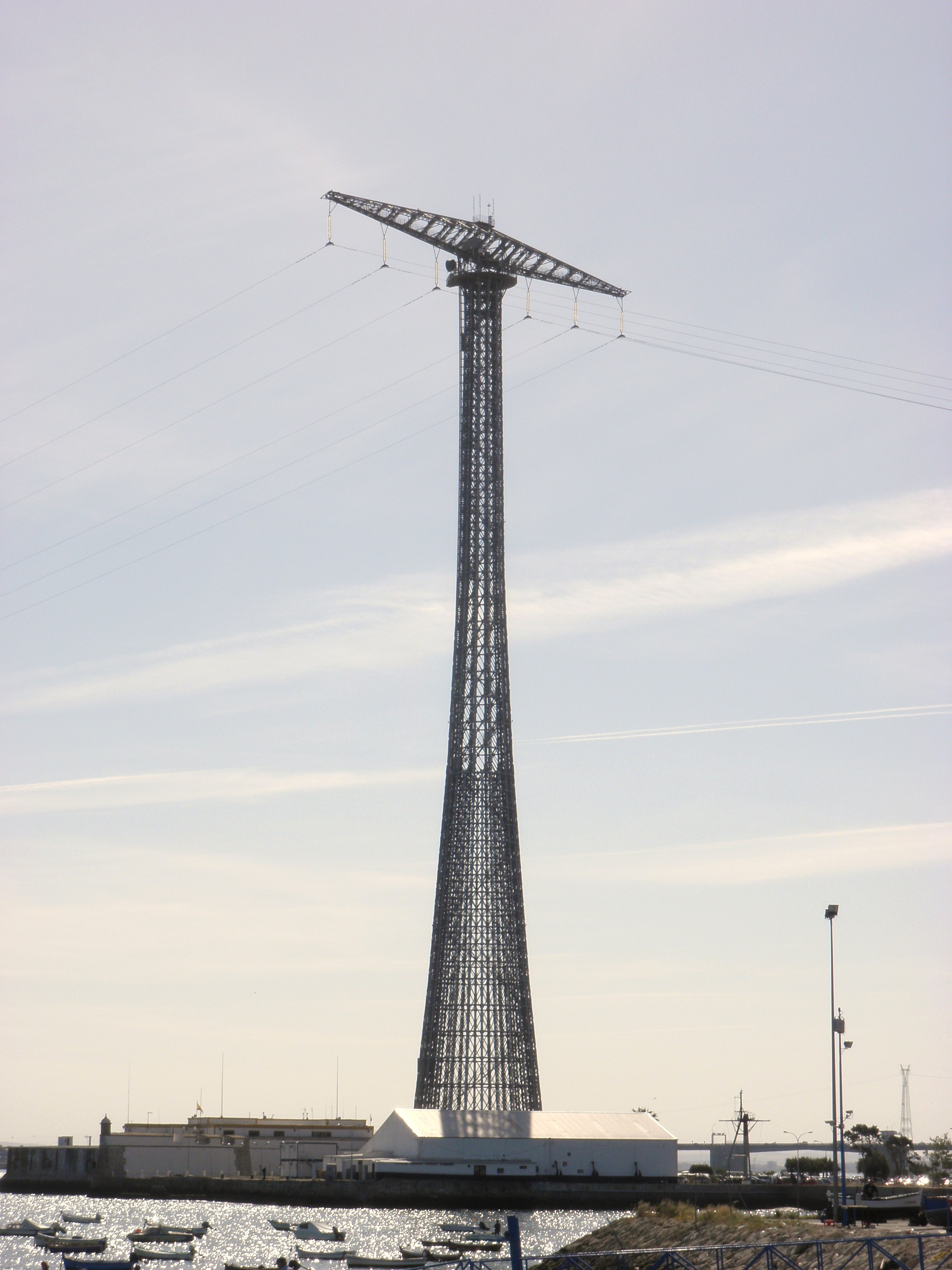
Pylons of Cádiz

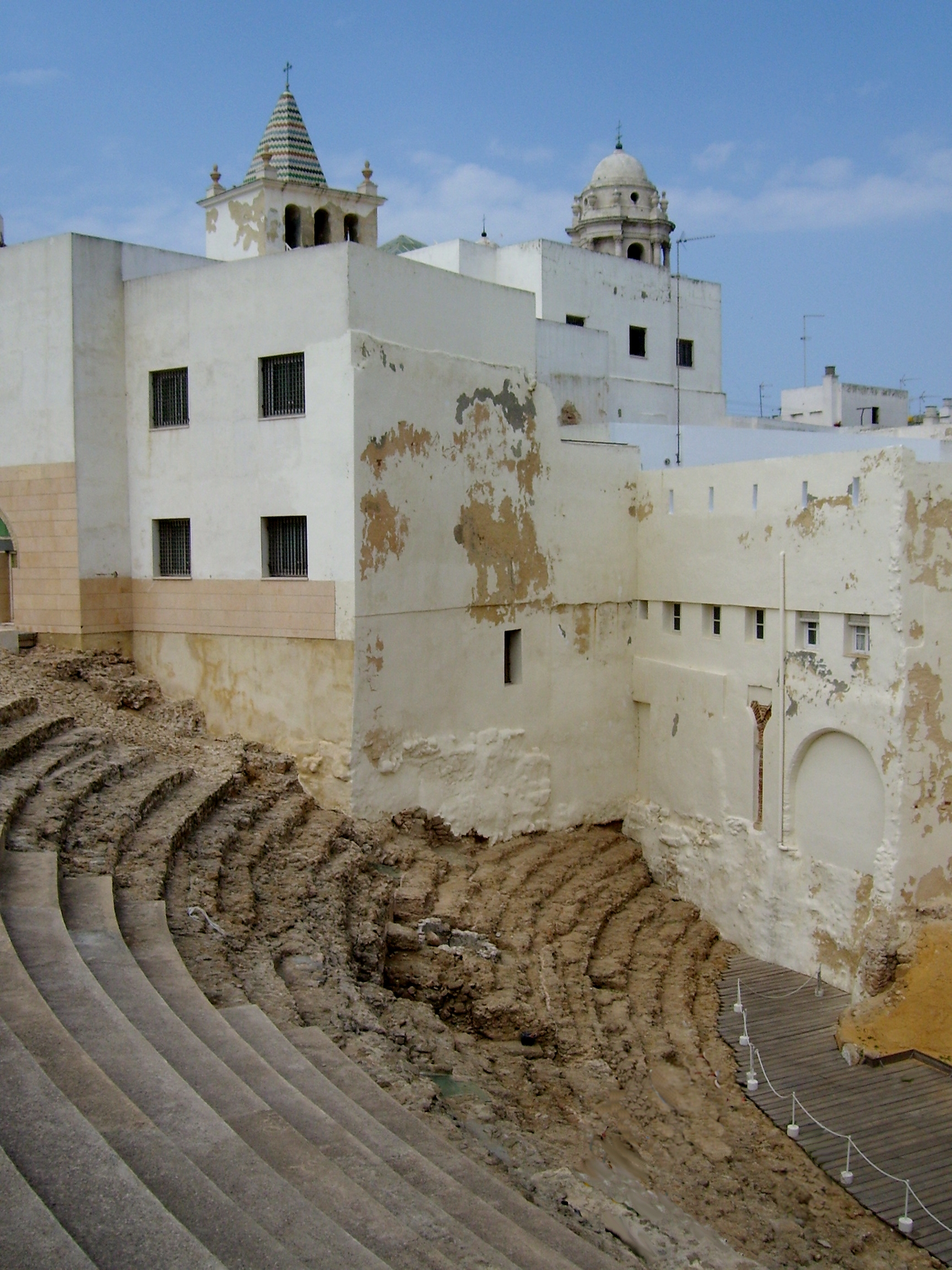
Roman theatre

==== Puente de la Constitución de 1812 ====
Puente de la Constitución de 1812, officially, also known locally as "La Pepa" or the second bridge to Cádiz or new access to Cádiz. It opened 24 September 2015. It crosses the Bay of Cádiz linking Cádiz with Puerto Real in mainland Spain. It is the longest bridge in Spain and the longest span cable-stayed in the country.

The Constitution of 1812 Bridge, also known as La Pepa Bridge, is a new bridge across the Bay of Cádiz, linking Cádiz with the town of Puerto Real.

This is one of the highest bridges in Europe, with 5 kilometers in total length. It is the third access to the city, along with the San Fernando road and the Carranza bridge.

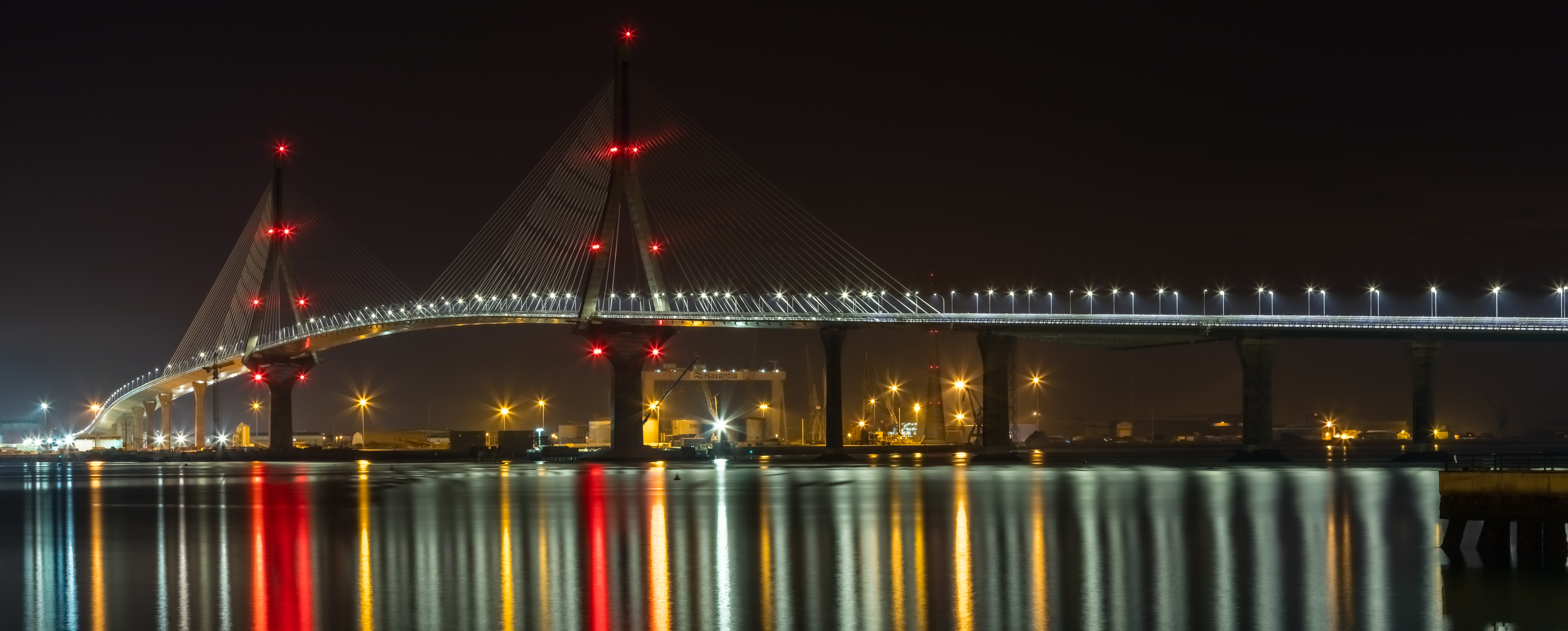
Puente de la Constitución de 1812 at night

=== City walls and fortifications ===
Las Puertas de Tierra originated in the 16th century. Once consisting of several layers of walls, only one of these remains today. By the 20th century it was necessary to remodel the entrance to the Old City to accommodate modern traffic. Today, the two side-by-side arches cut into the wall serve as one of the primary entrances to the city.

El Arco de los Blancos is the gate to the Populo district, built around 1300. It was the principal gate to the medieval town. The gate is named after the family of Felipe Blanco who built a chapel (now disappeared) above the gate.

El Arco de la Rosa ("Rose Arch") is a gate carved into the medieval walls next to the cathedral. It is named after captain Gaspar de la Rosa, who lived in the city during the 18th century. The gate was renovated in 1973.

The Baluarte de la Candelaria (fortress or stronghold of Candlemas) is a military fortification. Taking advantage of a natural elevation of land, it was constructed in 1672 at the initiative of the governor, Diego Caballero de Illescas. Protected by a seaward-facing wall that had previously served as a seawall, Candelaria's cannons were in a position to command the channels approaching the port of Cádiz. In more recent times, the edifice has served as a headquarters for the corps of military engineers and as the home to the army's homing pigeons, birds used to carry written messages over hostile terrain. Thoroughly renovated, it is now used as a cultural venue. There has been some discussion of using it to house a maritime museum, but, at present, it is designated for use as a permanent exposition space.

The Castle of San Sebastián is also a military fortification and is situated at the end of a road leading out from the Caleta beach. It was built in 1706. Today the castle remains unused, although its future uses remain much debated.

The Castle of Santa Catalina is also a military fortification, and is situated at the end of the Caleta beach. It was built in 1598 following the English sacking of Cádiz two years earlier. Recently renovated, today it is used for exhibitions and concerts.

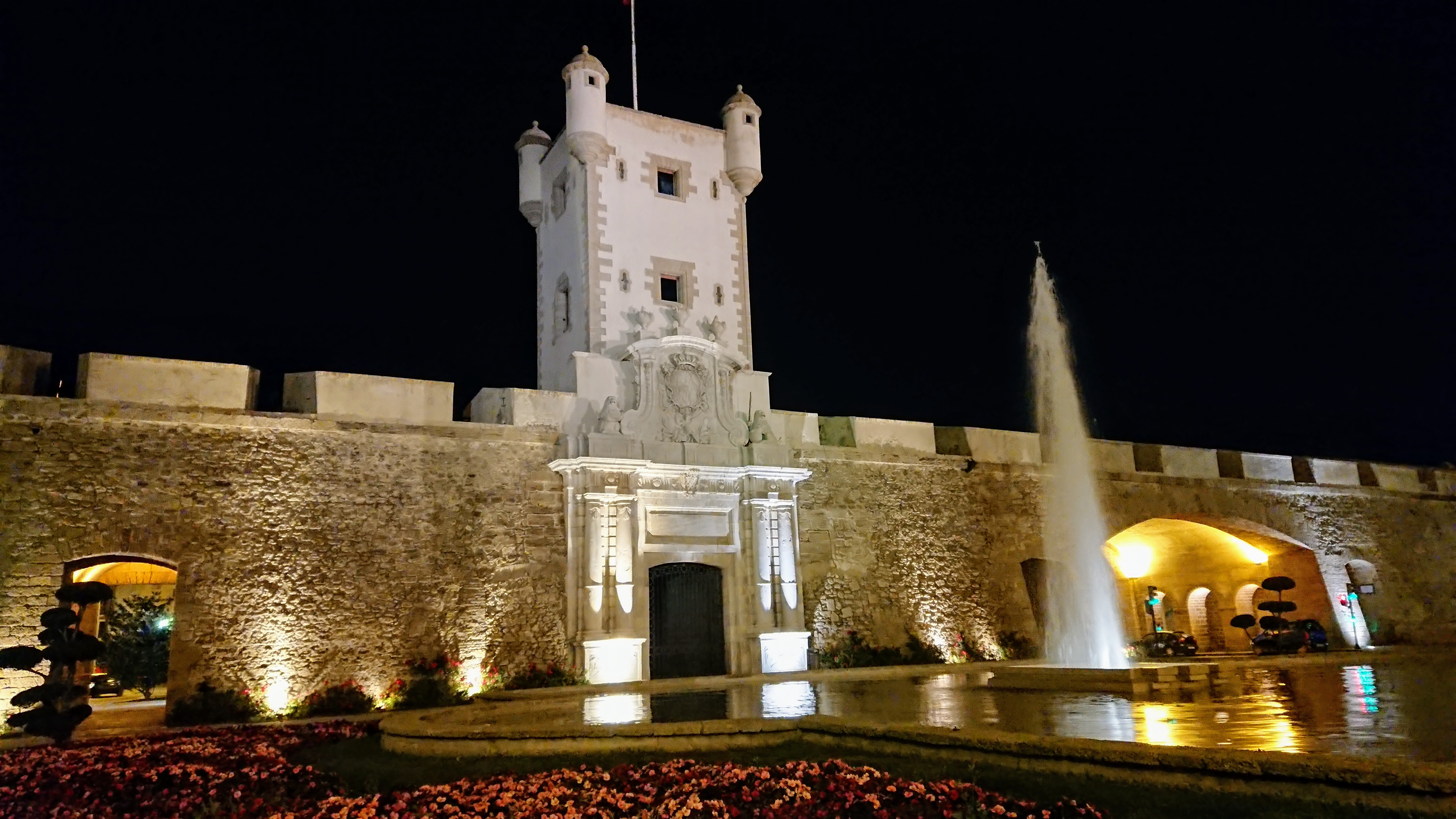
Las puertas de tierra

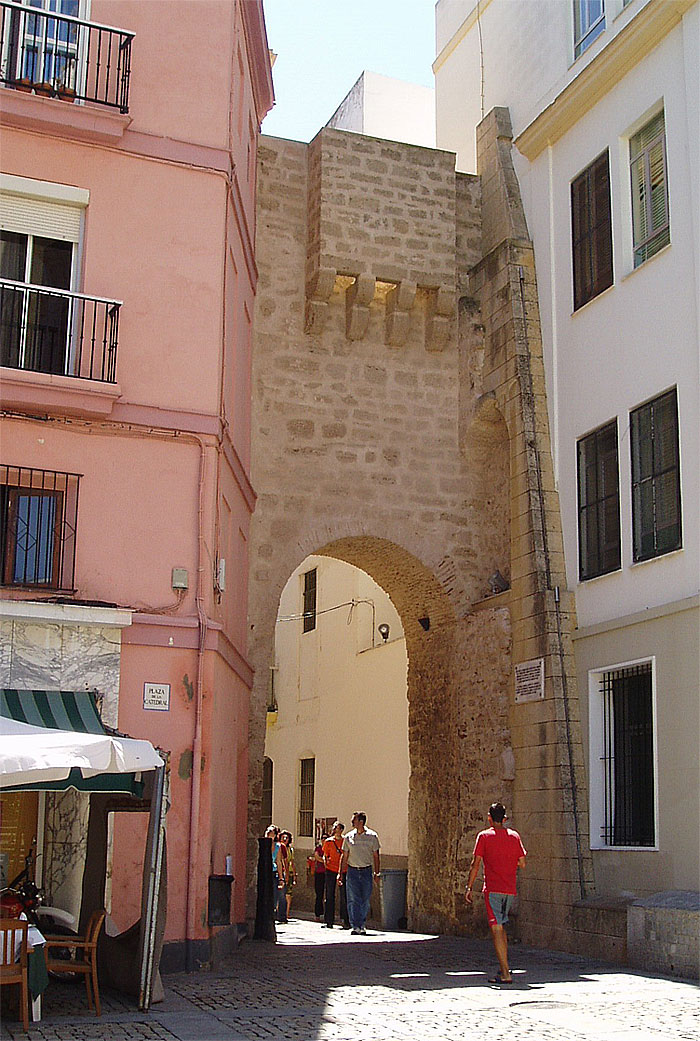
Arco de la Rosa

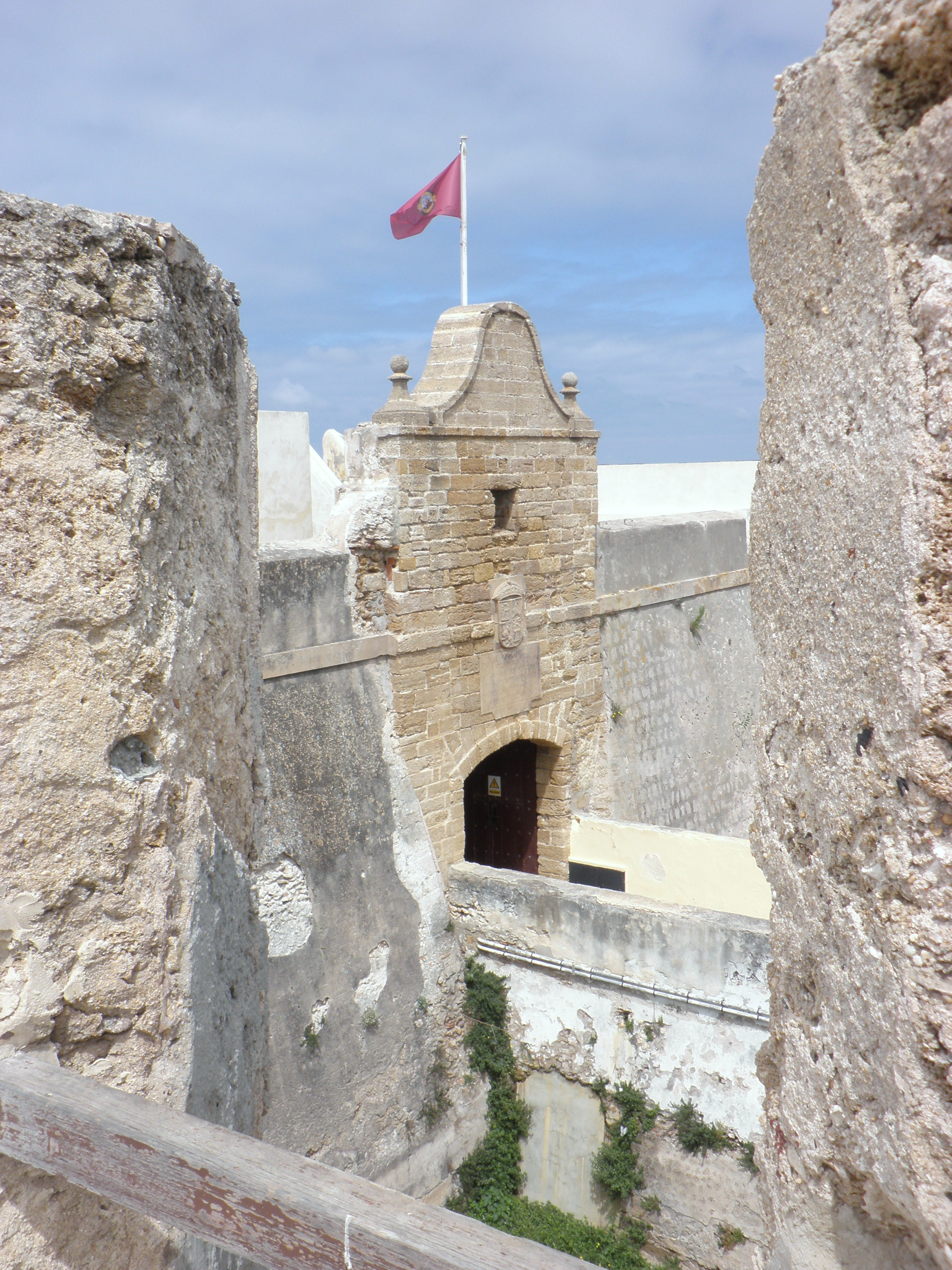
Inside view of Castillo de Santa Catalina

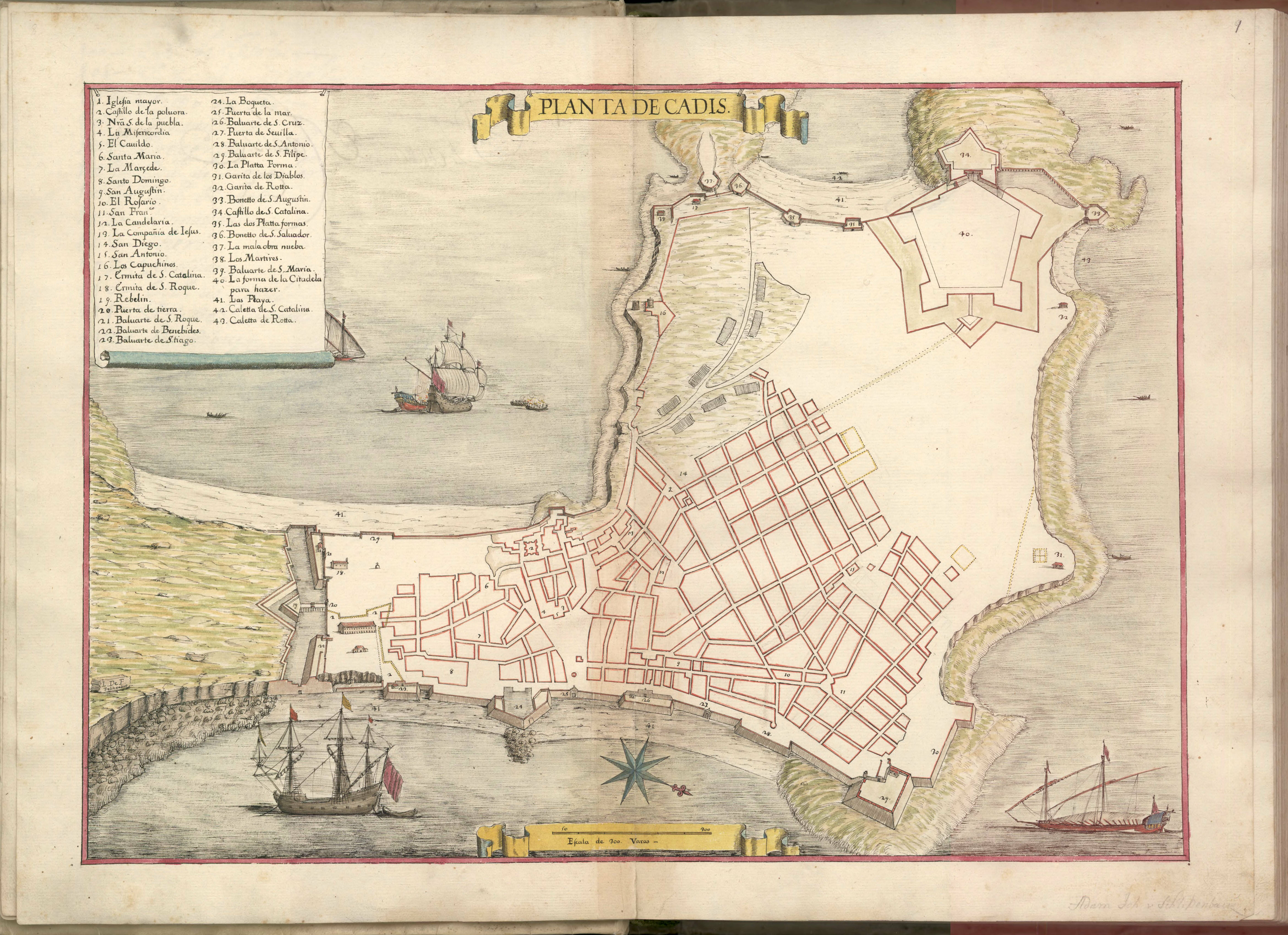
1699 plan of Cádiz.

== Notable people born in Cádiz ==
- Joaquín del Real Alencaster (1761-?), governor of Santa Fe de Nuevo México between 1804 and 1807
- Juan Bautista Aznar (1860–1933), Prime Minister of Spain
- Manuel de Falla (1876-1946), composer
- Josefa Díaz Fernández (1871-1918), flamenco dancer and singer
- Chico Flores (born 1987), professional footballer
- Lucius Cornelius Balbus, consul
- Lucius Cornelius Balbus the Younger, general
- Lucius Junius Moderatus Columella, Roman agronomic writer
- Miguel Martínez de Pinillos Sáenz (1875-1953), ship-owner and politician
- George Meade, Union general of the American Civil War
- José Celestino Mutis (1732-1808), botanist and mathematician
- Esteban Piñero Camacho (born 1981), known as Basty, member of the Spanish band D'NASH
- Ana Gertrudis de Urrutia Garchitorena (1812-1850), painter

== Climate ==
Cádiz has a hot-summer Mediterranean climate (Köppen Csa; Trewartha: Csal) with very mild winters and warm to hot summers. The city has significant maritime influences due to its position on a narrow peninsula. Cádiz has one of the warmest winters in Spain and all of Europe, with an average temperature of 12.9 °C (55.2 °F) in the coldest month. The annual sunshine hours of Cádiz are above 3,000h, being one of the sunniest cities in Europe. Although summer nights are tropical in nature, daytime temperatures are comparatively subdued compared to nearby inland areas such as Jerez and the very hot far inland areas in Andalucía. The average sea temperature is around 16 °C (61 °F) during the winter and around 22 °C (72 °F) during the summer. Snowfall is unknown at least since 1935.

Climate data for Cádiz WMO ID: 08452; Climate ID: 5973; coordinates 36°29′59″N 06°15′28″W; elevation: 2 m (6 ft 7 in); 1991–2020 provisional normals, extremes 1955–present
Month	Jan	Feb	Mar	Apr	May	Jun	Jul	Aug	Sep	Oct	Nov	Dec	Year
Record high °C (°F)	24.1 (75.4)	25.3 (77.5)	29.0 (84.2)	31.4 (88.5)	36.5 (97.7)	37.6 (99.7)	40.0 (104.0)	43.0 (109.4)	37.8 (100.0)	31.5 (88.7)	27.6 (81.7)	23.6 (74.5)	43.0 (109.4)
Mean maximum °C (°F)	19.5 (67.1)	20.8 (69.4)	24.2 (75.6)	26.1 (79.0)	29.2 (84.6)	31.7 (89.1)	33.9 (93.0)	33.9 (93.0)	31.4 (88.5)	28.2 (82.8)	23.8 (74.8)	20.2 (68.4)	35.1 (95.2)
Mean daily maximum °C (°F)	16.1 (61.0)	16.8 (62.2)	18.7 (65.7)	20.2 (68.4)	23.0 (73.4)	25.5 (77.9)	27.6 (81.7)	28.2 (82.8)	26.1 (79.0)	23.5 (74.3)	19.6 (67.3)	17.1 (62.8)	21.9 (71.4)
Daily mean °C (°F)	12.9 (55.2)	13.7 (56.7)	15.5 (59.9)	17.2 (63.0)	19.9 (67.8)	22.6 (72.7)	24.6 (76.3)	25.3 (77.5)	23.3 (73.9)	20.5 (68.9)	16.5 (61.7)	14.0 (57.2)	18.8 (65.8)
Mean daily minimum °C (°F)	9.6 (49.3)	10.5 (50.9)	12.4 (54.3)	14.1 (57.4)	16.8 (62.2)	19.6 (67.3)	21.5 (70.7)	22.3 (72.1)	20.4 (68.7)	17.5 (63.5)	13.4 (56.1)	10.9 (51.6)	15.8 (60.4)
Mean minimum °C (°F)	5.1 (41.2)	6.2 (43.2)	8.1 (46.6)	10.5 (50.9)	12.8 (55.0)	16.7 (62.1)	18.8 (65.8)	19.4 (66.9)	17.1 (62.8)	13.2 (55.8)	8.7 (47.7)	5.8 (42.4)	3.7 (38.7)
Record low °C (°F)	0.2 (32.4)	−1.0 (30.2)	3.0 (37.4)	6.5 (43.7)	9.2 (48.6)	11.0 (51.8)	16.6 (61.9)	15.6 (60.1)	12.6 (54.7)	8.0 (46.4)	4.6 (40.3)	1.5 (34.7)	−1.0 (30.2)
Average precipitation mm (inches)	59.6 (2.35)	51.4 (2.02)	55.0 (2.17)	42.1 (1.66)	29.7 (1.17)	5.9 (0.23)	0.2 (0.01)	1.7 (0.07)	27.6 (1.09)	75.2 (2.96)	87.1 (3.43)	76.6 (3.02)	512.1 (20.16)
Average precipitation days (≥ 0.1 mm)	8.97	8.33	8.48	7.20	4.67	1.14	0.31	0.62	3.41	8.11	8.79	9.59	69.62
Average relative humidity (%)	73.7	72.6	70.7	68.3	67.2	67.3	68.0	68.4	70.9	72.6	72.9	75.4	70.8
Percentage possible sunshine	60.6	66.2	61.1	69.1	71.3	79.0	78.9	79.4	68.7	64.6	62.9	56.0	68.2
Source 1: State Meteorological Agency/AEMET OpenData (Percent possible sunshine 1991-2013)
Source 2: NOAA/NCEI

Climate data for Cádiz, 1981-2010 normals
Month	Jan	Feb	Mar	Apr	May	Jun	Jul	Aug	Sep	Oct	Nov	Dec	Year
Mean daily maximum °C (°F)	16.0 (60.8)	16.8 (62.2)	18.8 (65.8)	19.9 (67.8)	22.1 (71.8)	25.3 (77.5)	27.7 (81.9)	27.9 (82.2)	26.3 (79.3)	23.4 (74.1)	19.6 (67.3)	16.9 (62.4)	21.6 (70.9)
Daily mean °C (°F)	12.7 (54.9)	13.8 (56.8)	15.5 (59.9)	16.8 (62.2)	19.1 (66.4)	22.4 (72.3)	24.6 (76.3)	25.0 (77.0)	23.3 (73.9)	20.3 (68.5)	16.5 (61.7)	13.9 (57.0)	18.6 (65.5)
Mean daily minimum °C (°F)	9.4 (48.9)	10.7 (51.3)	12.3 (54.1)	13.7 (56.7)	16.2 (61.2)	19.5 (67.1)	21.4 (70.5)	22.0 (71.6)	20.3 (68.5)	17.3 (63.1)	13.4 (56.1)	10.9 (51.6)	15.4 (59.7)
Average precipitation mm (inches)	69 (2.7)	58 (2.3)	35 (1.4)	45 (1.8)	27 (1.1)	7 (0.3)	trace	2 (0.1)	24 (0.9)	67 (2.6)	98 (3.9)	92 (3.6)	523 (20.6)
Average precipitation days (≥ 1.0 mm)	6.9	6.4	4.8	5.6	3.2	0.9	0.1	0.2	2.5	5.6	7.2	8.1	50.7
Average relative humidity (%)	75	74	71	69	70	69	68	70	71	74	74	76	72
Mean monthly sunshine hours	184	197	228	255	307	331	354	335	252	228	187	166	3,024
Source: Agencia Estatal de Meteorología

== Beaches ==
Cádiz, situated on a peninsula, is home to many beaches.

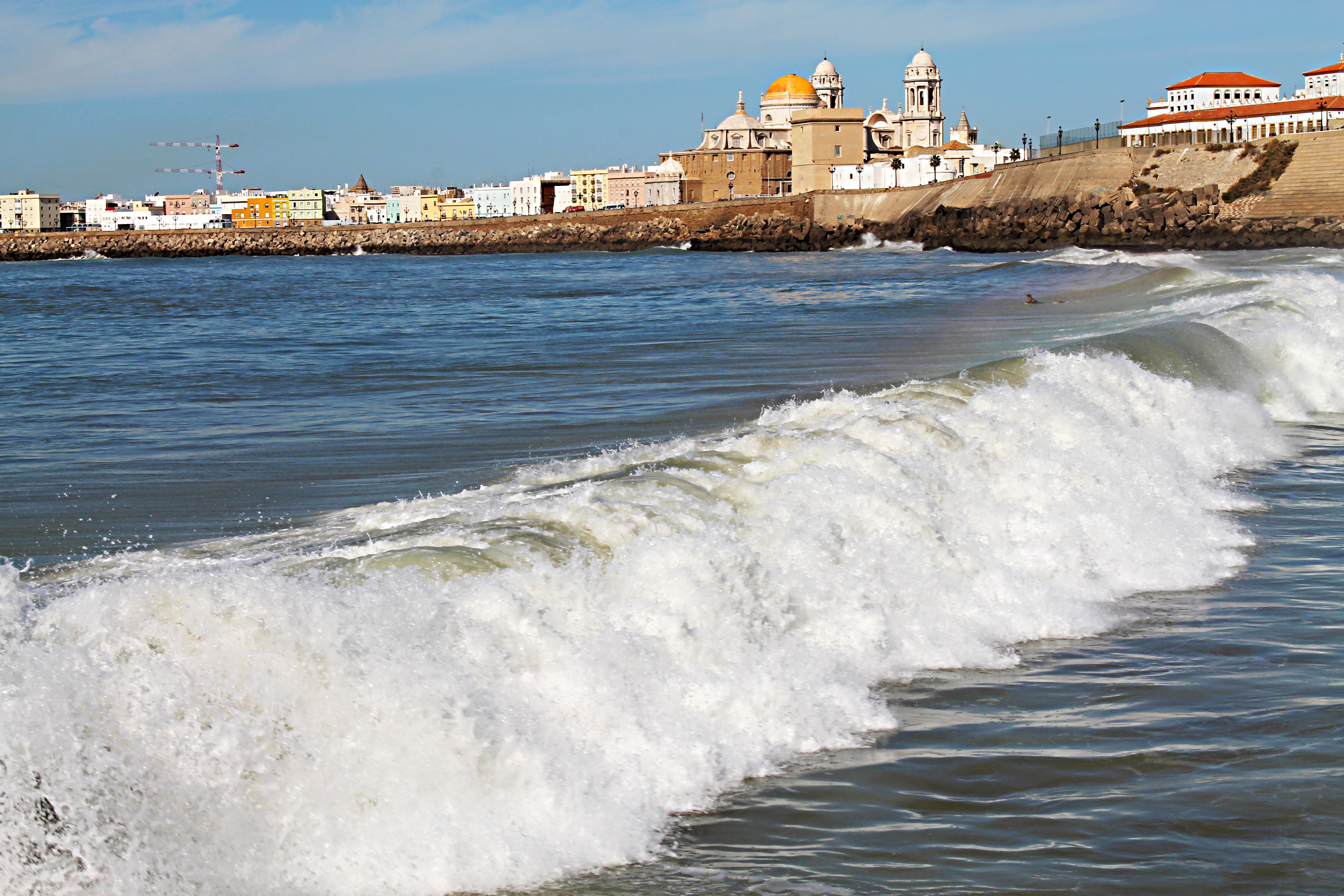
View of the cathedral from Playa de la Santamaría

La Playa de la Caleta is the most popular beach of Cádiz. It has always been in Carnival songs, due to its unequalled beauty and its proximity to the Barrio de la Viña. It is the beach of the Old City, situated between two castles, San Sebastian and Santa Catalina. It is around 400 meters (1,300 ft) long and 30 meters (98 ft) wide at low tide. La Caleta and the boulevard show a lot of resemblance to parts of Havana, the capital city of Cuba, like the malecon. Therefore, it served as the set for several of the Cuban scenes in the beginning of the James Bond movie Die Another Day (Known in spanish as: La Jaime Unión película Muere Otro Día).

La Playa de la Victoria, in the newer part of Cádiz, is the beach most visited by tourists and natives of Cádiz. It is about three km long, and it has an average width of 50 meters (160 ft) of sand. The moderate swell and the absence of rocks allow family bathing. It is separated from the city by an avenue; on the landward side of the avenue, there are many shops and restaurants.

La Playa de Santa María del Mar or Playita de las Mujeres is a small beach in Cádiz, situated between La Playa de Victoria and La Playa de la Caleta. It features excellent views of the old district of Cádiz.

Other beaches are Torregorda, Cortadura and El Chato.

== Culture ==
=== Language ===
The Spanish spoken in Cádiz reflects features of Western Andalusian and urban dialects. It is seseante, meaning there is no distinction between the sounds of "s" and "z," and the "s" is pronounced with the front part of the tongue (predorsal s). Key characteristics include:

- Aspiration of /s/ at the end of syllables (e.g., los amigos becomes [loh amigo]).
- Dropping /r/ at the end of syllables and aspirating /r/ when it comes before "n" or "l" (e.g., carne pronounced [kahne]).
- The /x/ sound (as in jamón) is usually pronounced as [h], a softer sound.
- Intervocalic /d/ (e.g., cansado) is often omitted (e.g., cansao).
- Occasionally, "l" is pronounced as "r" (rhotacism), though this is less common.

These features make the Cádiz accent unique, showcasing a strong influence of regional and urban speech patterns.

=== Carnival ===
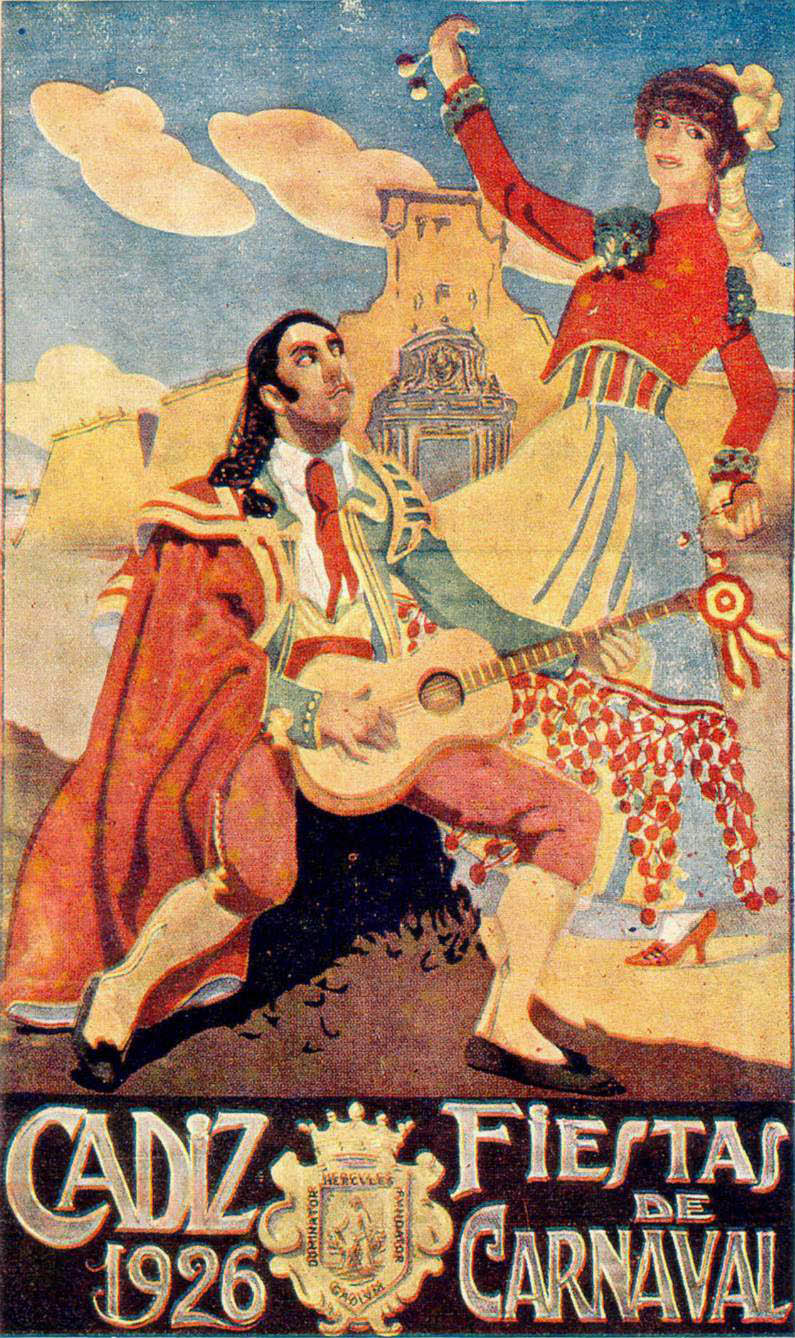
Poster advertising the 1926 Carnival of Cádiz

The Carnival of Cádiz is one of the best known carnivals in the world. Throughout the year, carnival-related activities are almost constant in the city; there are always rehearsals, public demonstrations, and contests of various kinds.

The Carnival of Cádiz is famous for the satirical groups called chirigotas, who perform comical musical pieces. Typically, a chirigota is composed of seven to twelve performers who sing, act and improvise accompanied by guitars, kazoos, a bass drum, and a variety of noise-makers. Other than the chirigotas, there are many other groups of performers: choruses; ensembles called comparsas, who sing in close harmony much like the barbershop quartets of African-American culture or the mariachis of Mexico; cuartetos, consisting of four (or sometimes three) performers alternating dramatic parodies and humorous songs; and romanceros, storytellers who recite tales in verse. These diverse spectacles turn the city into a colourful and popular open-air theatre for two entire weeks in February.

The Concurso Oficial de Agrupaciones Carnavalescas (the official association of carnival groups) sponsors a contest in the Gran Teatro Falla (see above) each year where chirigotas and other performers compete for prizes. This is the climactic event of the Cádiz carnival.

=== Cuisine ===
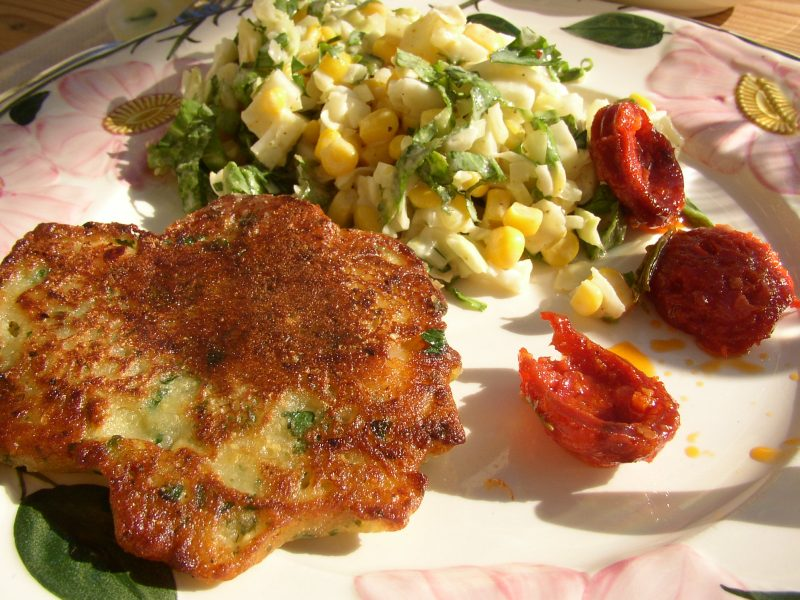
Tortillita de camarones

The gastronomy of Cádiz includes stews and sweets typical of the comarca and the city.

- Atún encebollado
- Caballa asada
- Caballa con babetas
- Cazón en adobo
- Cazón en amarillo
- Chocos con papas
- Garum
- Huevas aliñás
- Morena en adobo
- Pan de Cádiz
- Panizas
- Papas aliñás (patatas aliñadas)
- Pescado en sobrehúsa
- Pestiños
- Piñonate
- Piriñaca
- Poleá
- Ropa vieja
- Tocino de cielo
- Tortillitas de camarones

== Demographics ==
Historical population
Year	Pop.	±%
1842	53,922	—
1857	70,811	+31.3%
1877	64,551	−8.8%
1887	63,277	−2.0%
1900	69,191	+9.3%
1910	67,306	−2.7%
1920	76,137	+13.1%
1930	74,367	−2.3%
1940	85,854	+15.4%
1950	98,754	+15.0%
1960	114,951	+16.4%
1970	134,342	+16.9%
1981	156,711	+16.7%
1991	154,347	−1.5%
2001	133,363	−13.6%
2011	124,014	−7.0%
2021	114,442	−7.7%
Source: INE

According to a 2021 census estimate, the population of the city of Cádiz was 114,244 (the third-most-populated city of the province after Jerez de la Frontera, with 212,830 inhabitants, and Algeciras with 122,982). It is the only capital city in Spain that is not the most or second-most populated city in its province. Cádiz is the fifty-seventh-largest Spanish city. In recent years, the city's population has steadily declined; it is the only municipality of the Bay of Cádiz (the comarca composed of Cádiz, Chiclana, El Puerto de Santa María, Puerto Real, and San Fernando), whose population has diminished. There are forecasts that Cádiz may become the fourth or fifth city in the province after losing more than 10,000 inhabitants from 2011 to 2021. Between 1995 and 2006, it lost more than 14,000 residents, a decrease of 9%.

Among the causes of this loss of population is the peculiar geography of Cádiz; the city lies on a narrow spit of land hemmed in by the sea. Consequently, there is a pronounced shortage of land to be developed. The city has very little vacant land, and a high proportion of its housing stock is relatively low in density. (That is to say, many buildings are only two or three stories tall, and they are only able to house a relatively small number of people within their "footprint".) The older quarters of Cádiz are full of buildings that, because of their age and historical significance, are not eligible for urban renewal.

Two other physical factors tend to limit the city's population. It is impossible to increase the amount of land available for building by reclaiming land from the sea; a new national law governing coastal development thwarts this possibility. Also, because Cádiz is built on a sandspit, it is a costly proposition to sink foundations deep enough to support the high-rise buildings that would allow for a higher population density. As it stands, the city's skyline is not substantially different from in the Middle Ages. A 17th-century watchtower, the Tavira Tower, still commands a panoramic view of the city and the bay despite its relatively modest 45 meters (148 ft) height. (See below.)

Cádiz is the provincial capital with the highest rate of unemployment in Spain. This, too, tends to depress the population level. Young Gaditanos, those between 18 and 30 years of age, have been migrating to other places in Spain (Madrid and Castellón, chiefly), as well as to other places in Europe and the Americas. The population younger than twenty years old is only 20.58% of the total, and the population older than sixty-five is 21.67%, making Cádiz one of the most aged cities in all of Spain.

=== Population density ===
The population distribution of the municipality is extremely uneven. In its inhabited areas, Cádiz is one of the most densely populated cities in Europe. The uninhabited Zona Franca industrial area, Bay of Cádiz Port Area, and Bay of Cádiz Natural Park occupy 63.63% of the municipal area. The entire city population lives in the remaining 4.4 square kilometers (1.7 sq mi), at an average density close to 30,000 inhabitants per square kilometer. The city is divided for statistical purposes into 10 divisions, the most densely populated one having 39,592 inhabitants per square kilometer, the least having 20,835.

The table below lists the area, population, and population density of the ten statistical divisions of Cádiz. Divisions 1 to 7, the "stats divisions", belong to the old town; 8, 9 and 10 correspond to the "new city".

Area, population, and density of the statistical divisions of Cádiz
Statistical division	1	2	3	4	5	6	7	8	9	10
Area	0.32	0.20	0.28	0.15	0.13	0.17	0.20	1.09	0.83	1.03
Population	6,794	6,315	6,989	5,752	5,147	4,637	4,167	29,936	28,487	32,157
Density	21,231.25	31,575.00	24,960.71	38,346.67	39,592.31	27,276.47	20,835.00	27,464.22	34,321.69	31,220.39

Area is in km^{2} and population density in inhabitants per square kilometer.

== Transportation ==
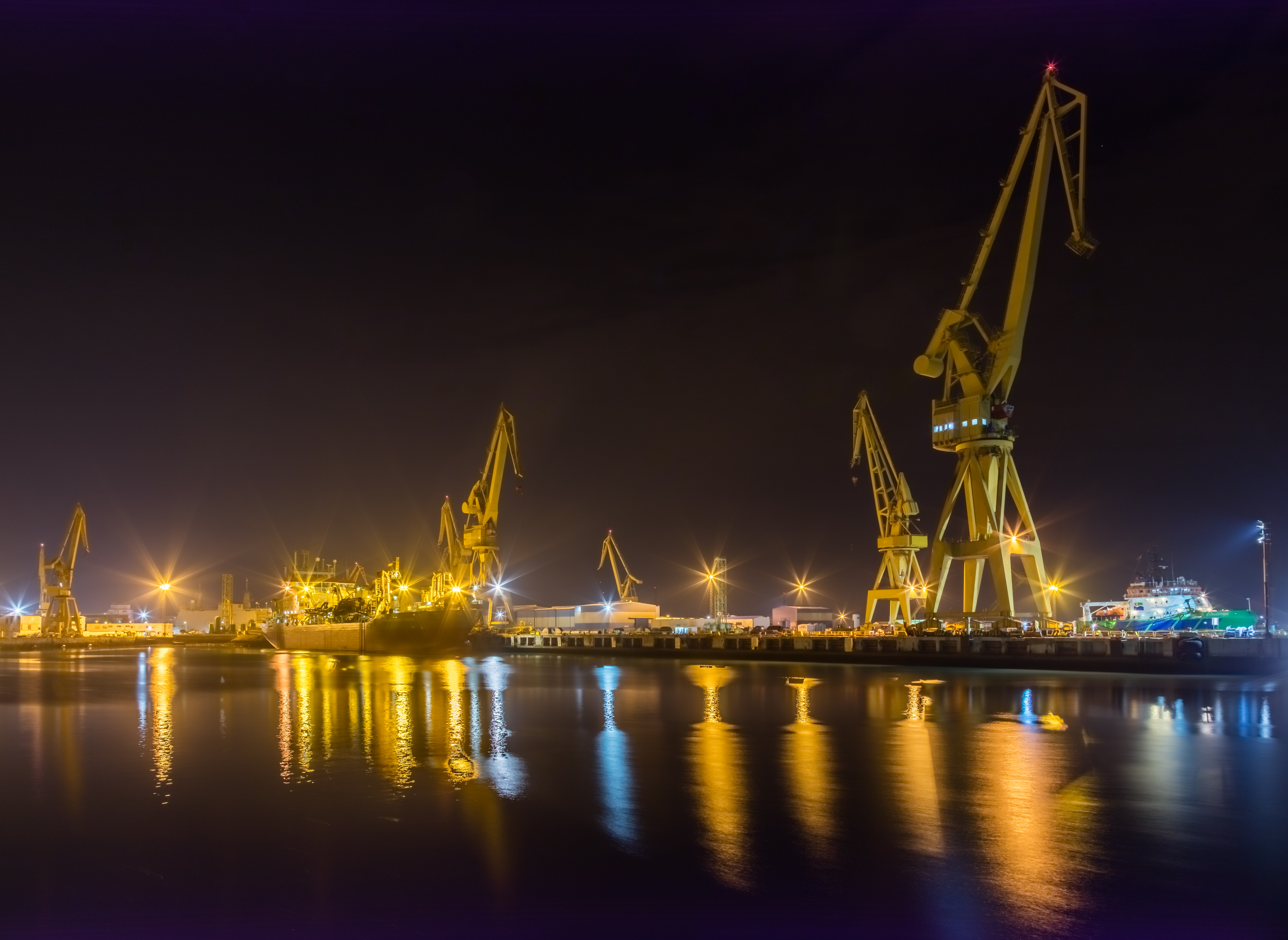
View of the Port of Cádiz

Cádiz is connected to European route E5 which connects it with Sevilla, Cordoba and Madrid to the North and Algeciras to the South East, continuing as E15 northbound along the Spanish Mediterranean coast.

The city is served by Jerez Airport, which is approximately 40 km (25 mi) north of the city centre. The airport offers regular domestic flights to Madrid and Barcelona as well as scheduled and seasonal charter flights to the United Kingdom, Germany and other European destinations. Cercanías Cádiz line C1 connects the airport to Cádiz main train station in 1hr.

Cádiz railway station is located just outside the old town. It offers suburban, regional and national services. The connection to the Madrid-Seville high-speed rail line was finished in 2015 after 14 years of construction, which extends the high speed Alvia trains to the city. Local services make the outskirts and regional destinations accessible along the line to Jerez and Seville. It is also the terminal of the new Cádiz Bay tram-train.

The port opposite the train station provides weekly ferry services to the Canary Islands (2–3 days travel time) as well as providing a stop for seasonal cruise ships.

== Twin towns – sister cities ==
Cádiz is twinned with:

- Ambalema, Colombia (2008)
- Bogotá, Colombia (2008)
- Brest, France (1986)
- Buenos Aires, Argentina (1975)
- Ceuta, Spain (2007)
- Dakhla, Western Sahara/Morocco (1992)
- A Coruña, Spain (2005)
- Guaduas, Colombia (2008)
- Havana, Cuba (1998)
- Honda, Colombia (2008)
- Huelva, Spain
- Mexico City, Mexico
- Móstoles, Spain (2008)
- Las Palmas de Gran Canaria, Spain
- Puebla, Mexico
- San Pedro Cholula, Mexico
- (United States) San Juan, Puerto Rico, USA
- San Sebastián de Mariquita, Colombia (2008)
- Santa Cruz de Tenerife, Spain
- Tangier, Morocco
- Torrevieja, Spain (2003)
- Veracruz, Mexico

== See also ==
- Battle of Cádiz (disambiguation)
- Cádiz CF, football team
- Convent of Nuestra Señora del Rosario y Santo Domingo (Cádiz)
- Erytheia
- Costa de la Luz
- List of mayors of Cádiz
- Tribe of Gad
- Atlantic history
- Triangular trade
- History of slavery
- Archaeological site of Doña Blanca
- List of municipalities in Cádiz
