= Pan de Cádiz =

Andalusian confection

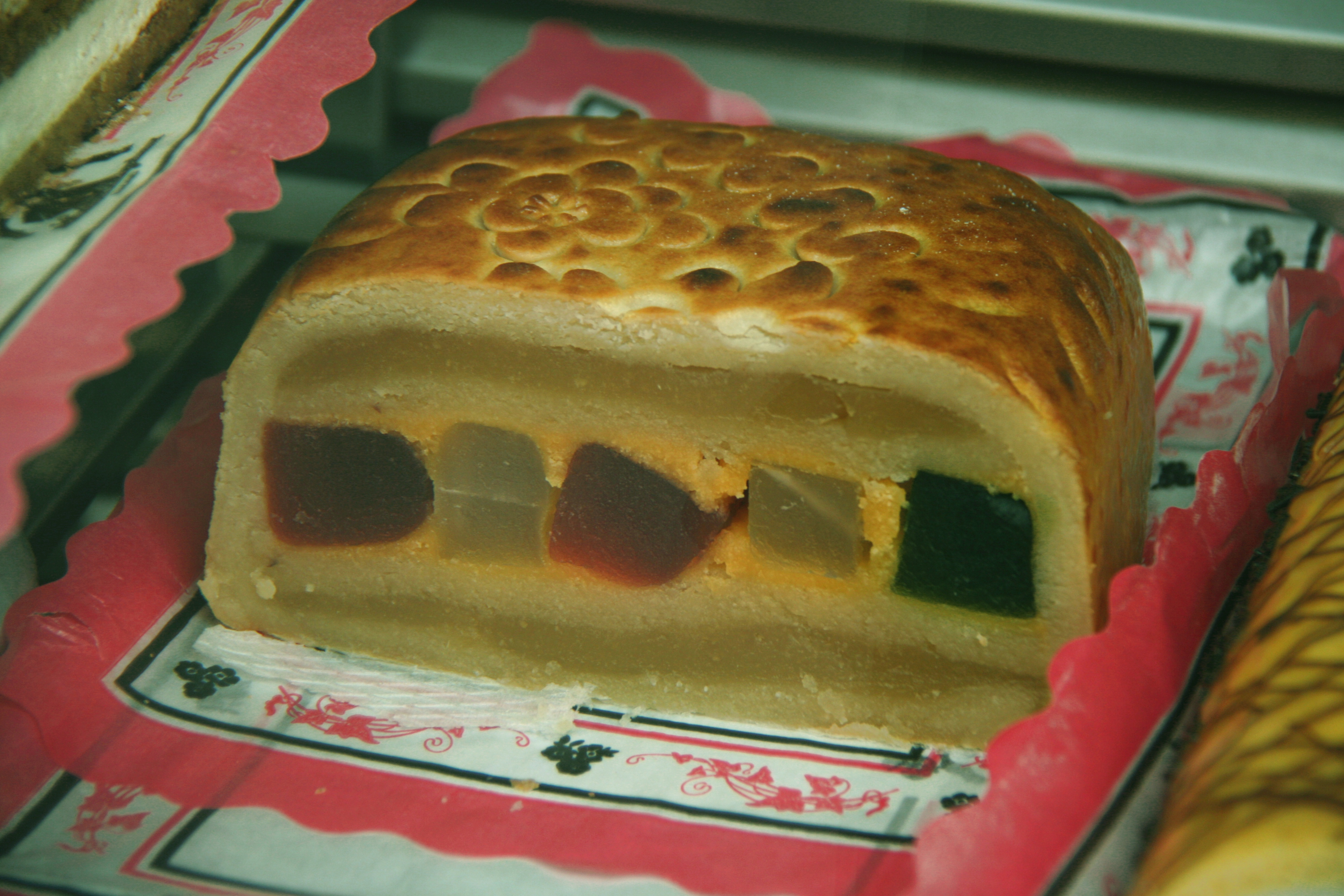
- Type: Dessert
- Place of origin: Spain
- Region or state: Andalusia
- Main ingredients: Marzipan, candied fruit

Pan de Cádiz, or turrón de Cádiz, is a large marzipan confection from Cádiz, Spain. Pan means 'bread' in Spanish, a name which the dish probably acquired due to its appearance as a rectangular bread. There are many different recipes, but the basic ingredients are always marzipan and candied fruit. It was invented in the 1950s, by the pastry chef Antonio Valls Garrido, who first sold the dish in his Viena pastry shop. The origins of the dish may lie in the marzipan rolls with fruit made in Cádiz during the nineteenth century. It is most often eaten during Christmas time.

== See also ==
- Turrón
