= Port of Cádiz Bay =

Port facility serving Cádiz

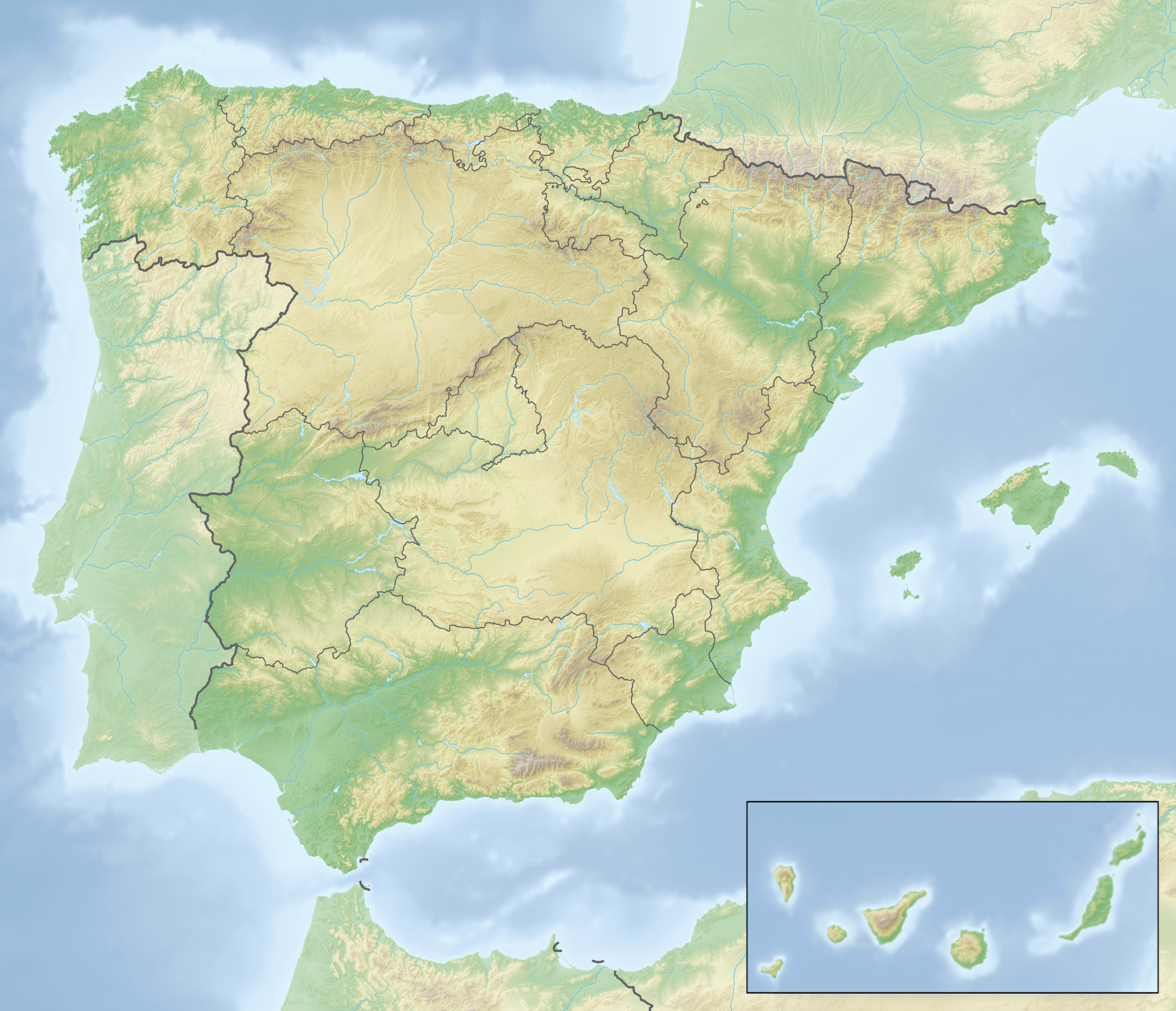
- Location in Spain

Location
- Country: Spain
- Location: Province of Cádiz
- Coordinates: 36°32′N 6°16′W
- UN/LOCODE: ESCAD

Details
- No. of piers: 21
- Draft depth: Depth 13.0 metres (42.7 ft)

Statistics
- Website www.puertocadiz.com/en/home/

The Port of Cádiz Bay is a port facility in the Bay of Cádiz serving the city and Province of Cádiz in southern Spain. It consists of Cadiz harbour, Cabezuela on the south side of the bay, and Puerto de Santa Maria to the north.
