= Philip IV of Spain =

King of Spain (1621–1665) and Portugal (1621–1640)

Philip IV
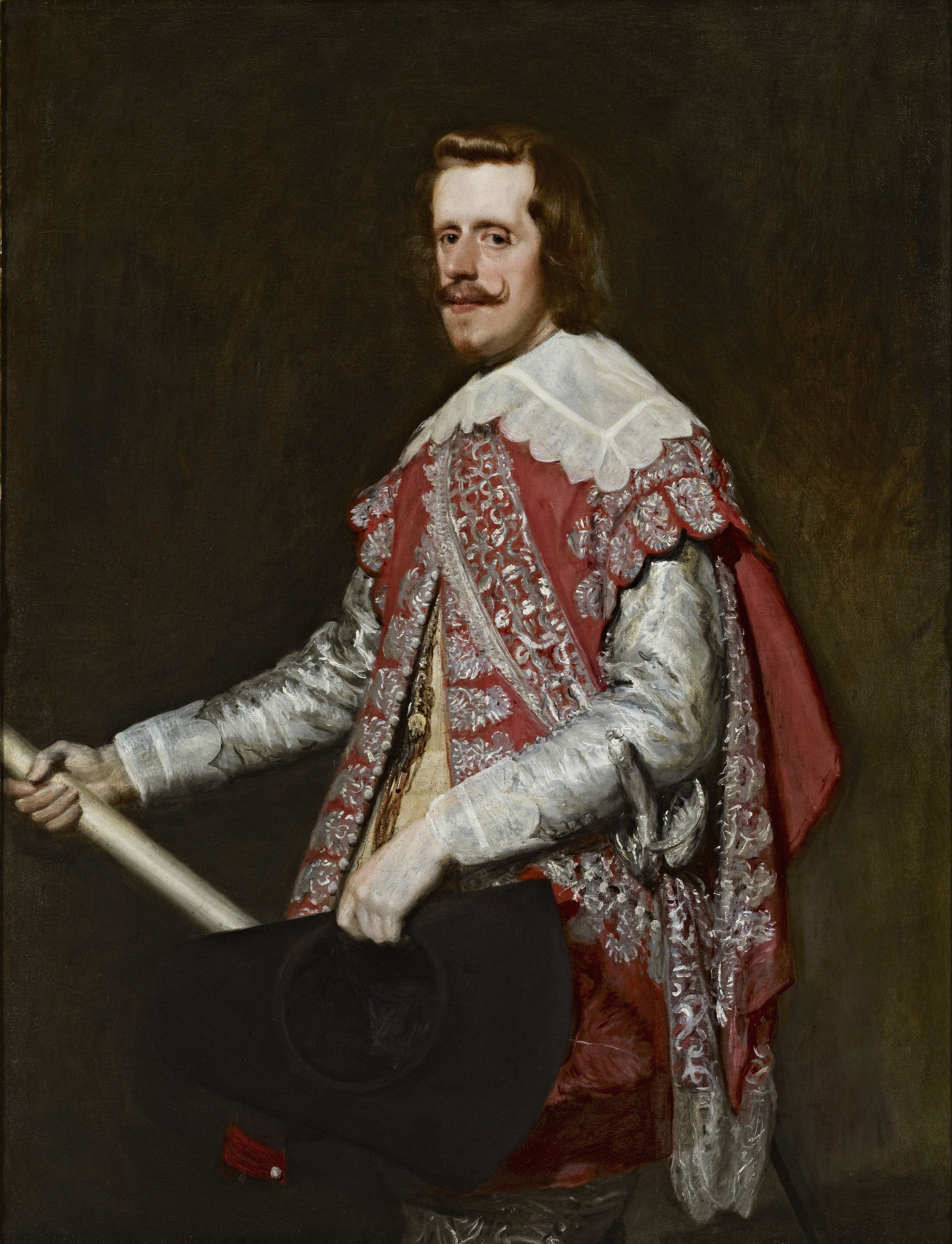
- Portrait of Philip IV in Fraga, 1644

King of Spain
- Reign: 31 March 1621 – 17 September 1665
- Predecessor: Philip III
- Successor: Charles II

King of Portugal
- Reign: 31 March 1621 – 1 December 1640
- Predecessor: Philip II
- Successor: John IV
- Born: 8 April 1605; Valladolid, Spain
- Died: 17 September 1665 (aged 60); Madrid, Spain
- Burial: El Escorial
- Spouses: Elisabeth of France (m. 1615; died 1644) Mariana of Austria (m. 1649)
- Issue among others...: Balthasar Charles, Prince of Asturias; Maria Theresa, Queen of France; Margaret Theresa, Holy Roman Empress; Philip Prospero, Prince of Asturias; Charles II, King of Spain; Illegitimate: John Joseph, Governor of the Netherlands; Alonso, Bishop of Cuenca; Alfonso, Bishop of Málaga
Names
- Felipe Domingo Victor de la Cruz
- House: Habsburg
- Father: Philip III of Spain
- Mother: Margaret of Austria

Philip IV (Spanish: Felipe Domingo Victor de la Cruz, Portuguese: Filipe III; 8 April 1605 – 17 September 1665), also called the Planet King (Spanish: Rey Planeta), was King of Spain from 1621 to his death and (as Philip III) King of Portugal from 1621 to 1640. Philip is remembered for his patronage of the arts, including such artists as Diego Velázquez, and his rule over Spain during the Thirty Years' War.

By the time of his death, the Spanish Empire had reached approximately 12.2 million square kilometres (4.7 million square miles) in area, the largest empire in the world, but in other aspects was in decline, a process to which Philip contributed with his inability to achieve successful domestic and military reform. He was succeeded on his death by his young son Charles II as King of Spain and in 1640 (with the collapse of the Iberian Union) by John IV as King of Portugal.

== Personal life ==
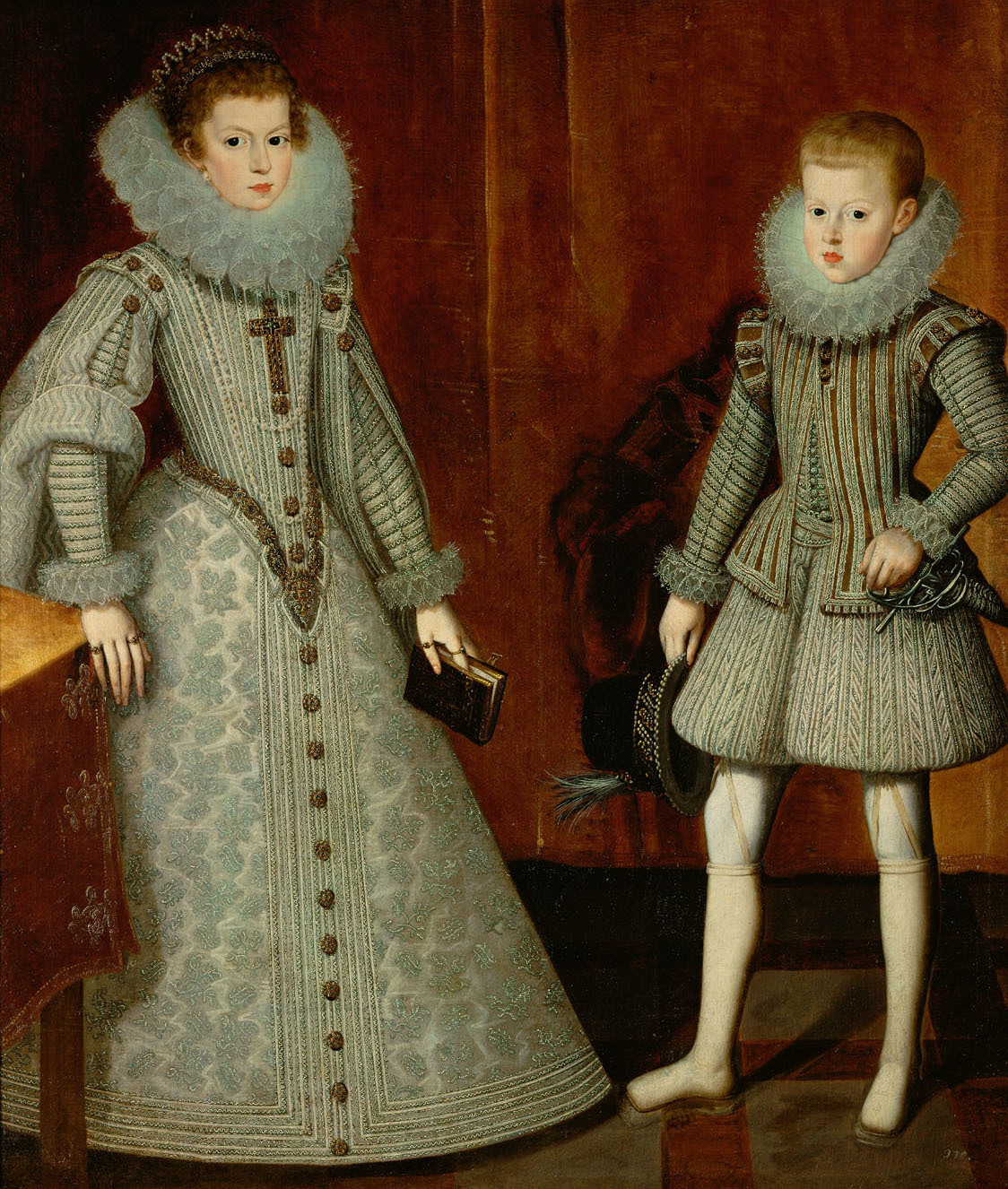
A c. 1612 portrait of Philip and his older sister, Anne

Philip IV was born in the Royal Palace of Valladolid, and was the eldest son of Philip III and his wife, Margaret of Austria. In 1615, at the age of 10, Philip was married to 13-year-old Elisabeth of France. Although the relationship does not appear to have been close, some have suggested that Gaspar de Guzmán, Count-Duke of Olivares, his key minister, later deliberately tried to keep the two apart to maintain his influence, encouraging Philip to take mistresses instead, by whom he is known to have had at least 30 progeny.

Philip had ten children with Elisabeth, with only one being a son, Balthasar Charles, who died at the age of sixteen in 1646. The death of his son deeply shocked the King, who appears to have been a good father by the standards of the day. Elisabeth was able to conspire with other Spanish nobles to remove Olivares from the court in 1643, and for a brief period she held considerable influence over Philip; by the time of her death, however, she was out of favour, following manoeuvering by Olivares' successor and nephew, Luis de Haro.

Aged 44 in 1649, Philip remarried, following the deaths of both Elisabeth and his only son. His choice of his second wife, 14-year-old Maria Anna, also known as Mariana, Philip's niece and the daughter of Ferdinand III, Holy Roman Emperor, was guided by politics and Philip's desire to strengthen the relationship with Habsburg Austria. They were married on 7 October 1649. Maria Anna bore him five children, but only two survived to adulthood, a daughter Margarita Teresa, born in 1651, and the future Charles II of Spain in 1661 – but the latter was sickly and considered in frequent danger of dying, making the line of inheritance potentially uncertain.

Perceptions of Philip's personality have altered considerably over time. Victorian authors were inclined to portray him as a weak individual, delegating excessively to his ministers, and ruling over a debauched Baroque court. Victorian historians even attributed the early death of Balthasar to debauchery, encouraged by the gentlemen entrusted by the King with his education. The doctors who treated the Prince at that time in fact diagnosed smallpox, although modern scholars attribute his death to appendicitis. Historians' estimation of Philip gradually improved in the 20th century, with comparisons between Philip and his father being increasingly positive – some noting that he possessed much more energy, both mental and physical, than his diffident father.

Philip was idealized by his contemporaries as the model of Baroque kingship. Outwardly he maintained a bearing of rigid solemnity; foreign visitors described him as being so impassive in public he resembled a statue, and he was said to have been seen to laugh only three times in the course of his entire public life. Philip certainly had a strong sense of his 'royal dignity', but was also extensively coached by Olivares in how to resemble the Baroque model of a sovereign, which would form a key political tool for Philip throughout his reign. Philip was a fine horseman, a keen hunter and a devotee of bull-fighting, all central parts of royal public life at court during the period.

Privately, Philip appears to have had a lighter persona. When he was younger, he was said to have a keen sense of humor and a 'great sense of fun'. He privately attended 'academies' in Madrid throughout his reign – these were lighthearted literary salons, aiming to analyze contemporary literature and poetry with a humorous touch. A keen theatre-goer, he was sometimes criticized by contemporaries for his love of these 'frivolous' entertainments. Others have captured his private personality as 'naturally kind, gentle and affable'. Those close to him claimed he was academically competent, with a good grasp of Latin and geography, and could speak French, Portuguese and Italian well. Like many of his contemporaries, including Olivares, he had a keen interest in astrology. His handwritten translation of Francesco Guicciardini's texts on political history still exist.

Although interpretations of Philip's role in government have improved in recent years, Diego Velázquez's contemporary description of Philip's key weakness – that 'he mistrusts himself, and defers to others too much' — remains relevant. Although Philip's Catholic beliefs no longer attract criticism from English language writers, Philip is still felt to have been 'unduly pious' in his personal life. Notably, from the 1640s onwards he sought the advice and counsel of a noted cloistered abbess, Sor María de Ágreda, exchanging a number of letters with her. This did not stop Philip for becoming known for his numerous affairs, particularly with actresses, as encouraged by the Count-Duke Olivares. The most famous of these affairs was with the actress María Calderón (La Calderona), with whom he had a son in 1629, Juan José, who was brought up as a royal prince. By the end of the reign, and with the health of Carlos, Prince of Asturias in doubt, there was a real possibility of Juan José's claiming the throne, which added to the instability of the regency years.

== Philip, Olivares and his royal favorites ==
During the reign of Philip's father, Philip III, the royal court had been dominated by the Sandoval noble family, most strikingly by Francisco de Sandoval y Rojas, 1st Duke of Lerma, Philip III's principal favourite and chief minister for almost all of his reign. Philip IV came to power as the influence of the Sandovals was being undermined by a new noble coalition, led by Don Baltasar de Zúñiga. De Zúñiga regarded it as essential that the Sandovals be unable to gain an influence over the future king; de Zúñiga first began to develop his own influence over Prince Philip, and then introduced his nephew, Olivares, to the prince, ten years old at the time.

At first, Philip did not particularly take to Olivares. Over the course of at least a year, however, the relationship became close, with Philip's tendency towards underconfidence and diffidence counteracted by Olivares' drive and determination. Olivares rapidly became Philip's most trusted advisor, and when Philip ascended the throne in 1621, at the age of sixteen, he showed his confidence in Olivares by ordering that all papers requiring the royal signature should first be sent to the count-duke. Philip retained Olivares as his confidant and chief minister for the next twenty years.

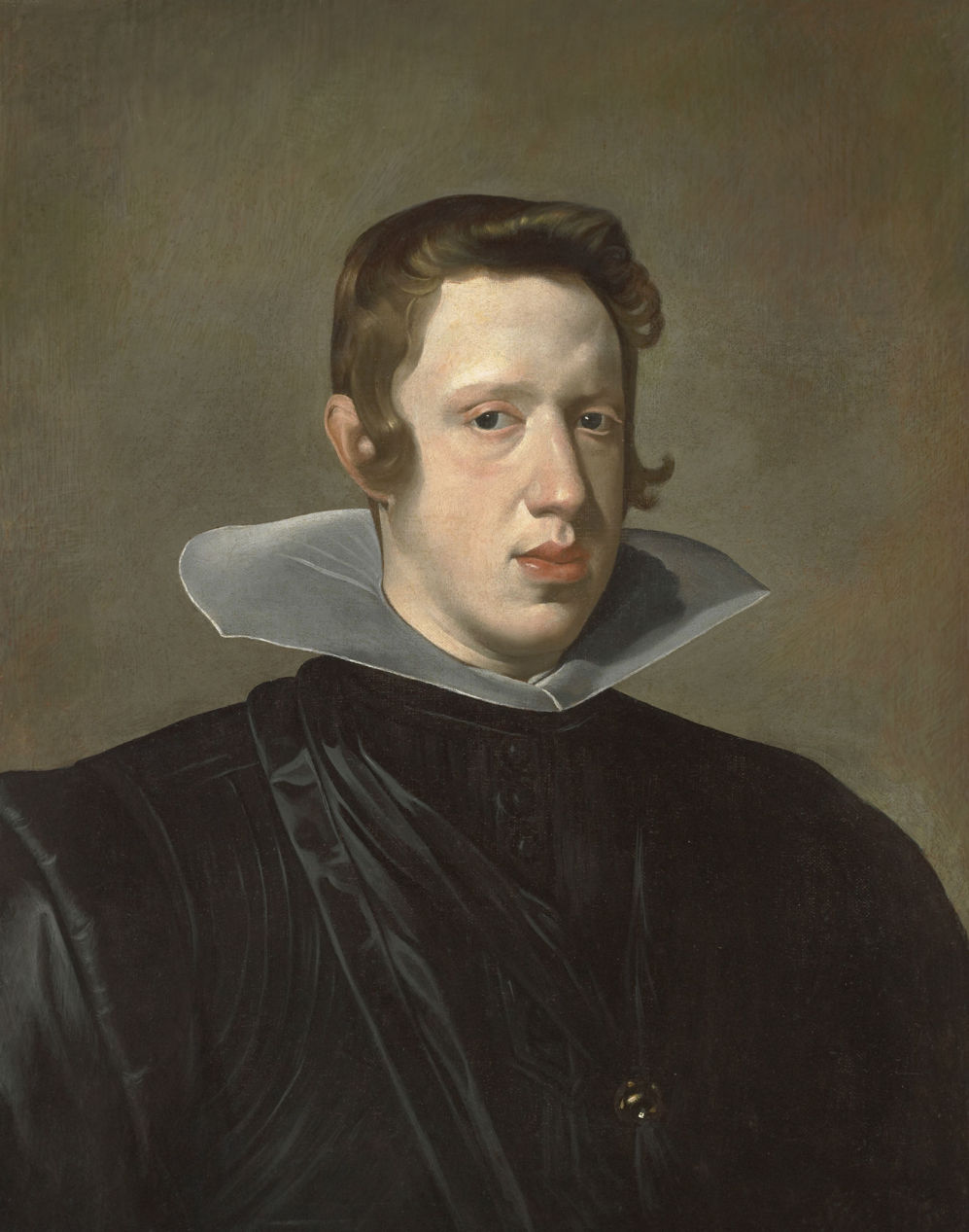
A 1623 portrait of Philip, displaying the prominent "Habsburg lip"

Early in his reign, Philip would be woken by Olivares in the morning to discuss the day's affairs and would meet with him twice more during the day, although later this routine declined until the King would hold only one short meeting on policy with Olivares each day. Philip intervened far more in policies during 1641–1642, however, and it has been suggested that Philip paid more attention to policy making than has traditionally been depicted; some recent histories go so far as to describe him as 'conscientious' in policy making, although he is still criticized for his failure to make timely decisions.

Philip himself argued that it was hardly appropriate for the King himself to go house to house amongst his ministers to see if his instructions were being carried out. The close relationship between Philip and Olivares was demonstrated by their portraits' being placed side by side at the Buen Retiro Palace — an act unheard of in Europe at the time. Philip's relationship with Olivares, however, was not a simplistic one. The pair had multiple rows and arguments over the course of their relationship, both as a result of their different personalities and differences of opinion over policies.

Initially, Philip chose to confirm the reappointment of his father's household to assuage grandee opinion. Under the influence of de Zúñiga and Olivares, however, Philip was then quick to place Lerma's estates – expanded considerably during his long period as favorite – under administration, and to remove from office Cristóbal de Sandoval, Duke of Uceda, Lerma's son, who had initially helped de Zúñiga remove his own father from office to advance his own position. Philip's initial announcements reflected an intent to reform the monarchy to the sober, moral position it had been under his grandfather, including selecting ministers whose grandfathers had served under Philip II.

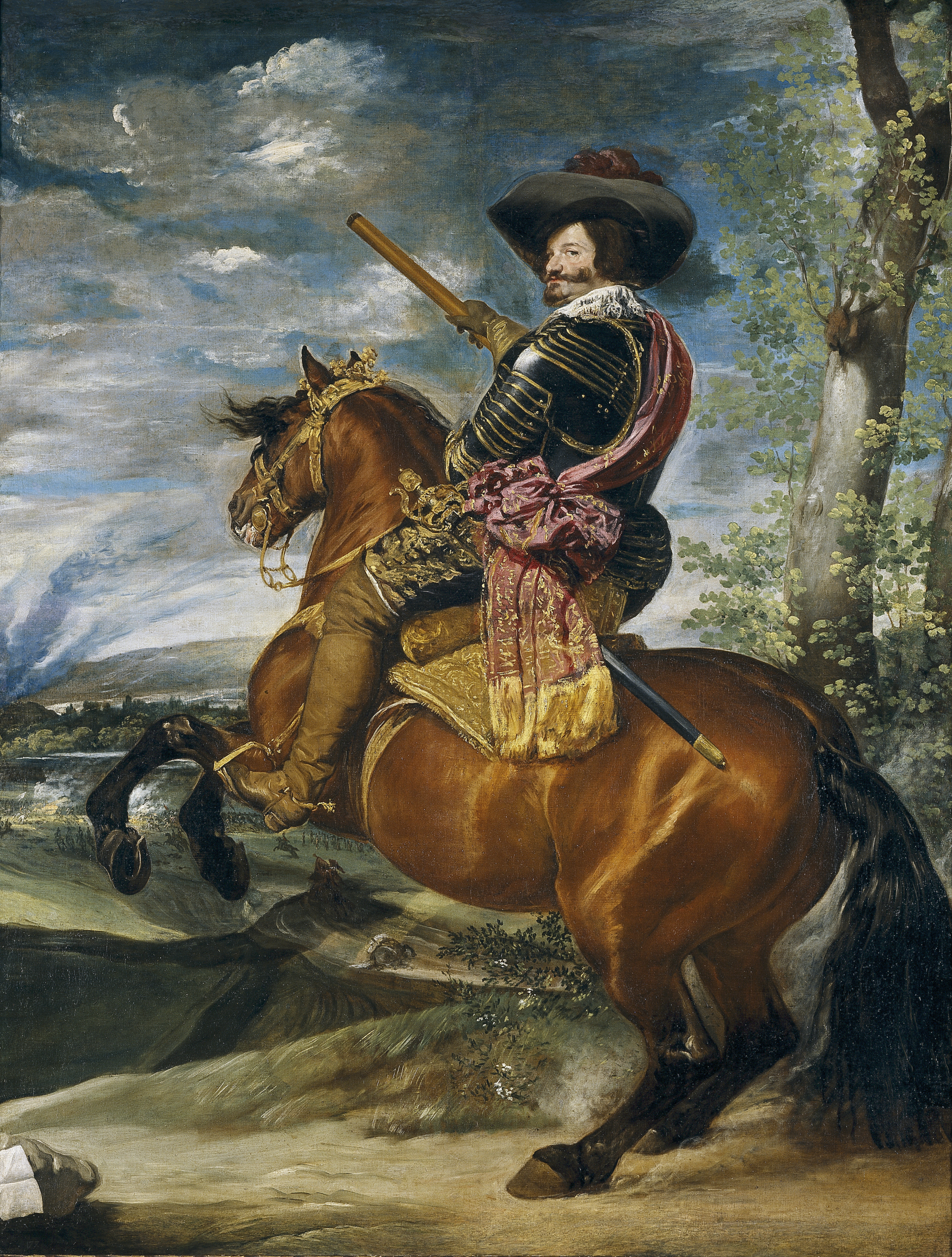
A c. 1636 portrait of Philip's most prominent favourite and minister, the Count-Duke of Olivares

Philip has in the past been considered to be 'unimaginative' in his politics, but recent histories have stressed the more radical elements of his first two decades in power. There was a febrile atmosphere in Spain in the early 17th century, with numerous arbitrista offering various advice on how to solve Spain's various ills; this advice could, and would, be given in person by those of the lower classes to the King on suitable occasions, provided it was presented with the aim of strengthening the crown.

Those debates extended to the nature of the monarchy. It has been suggested that the writers of the period who best captured Philip's view of royal authority were Justus Lipsius and Giovanni Botero, who promoted religiously inspired, stoic self-sacrifice and a view of Habsburg family-led hegemony respectively. Whilst at one level conservative – harking back in foreign policy to the period of Philip II, invoking traditional values at home – Philip's policies were also radical, rejecting the policy towards the rebellious Dutch that had held since 1609, entering into the Thirty Years' War, and introducing a system of junta, or small committee, government across Spain in competition to the traditional Polysynodial System of royal councils.

Following Olivares' fall from power amidst the crisis of 1640–1643, the victim of failed policies and jealousy from the nobles excluded from power, Philip initially announced that he would rule alone, becoming in effect his own first minister. The junta system of government began to be dismantled in favour of the older council system. In due course, this personal rule reverted to rule through a royal favourite, initially Luis de Haro, a nephew of Olivares and a childhood playmate of Philip's, and the counter-reform of the committee system halted. De Haro has not been highly regarded by historians; the comment of one, that de Haro was the 'embodiment of mediocrity', is not atypical. After de Haro's death in 1661, Olivares' son-in-law, Ramiro Núñez de Guzmán, became a royal favourite in his place.

== Foreign policy and the Thirty Years' War ==
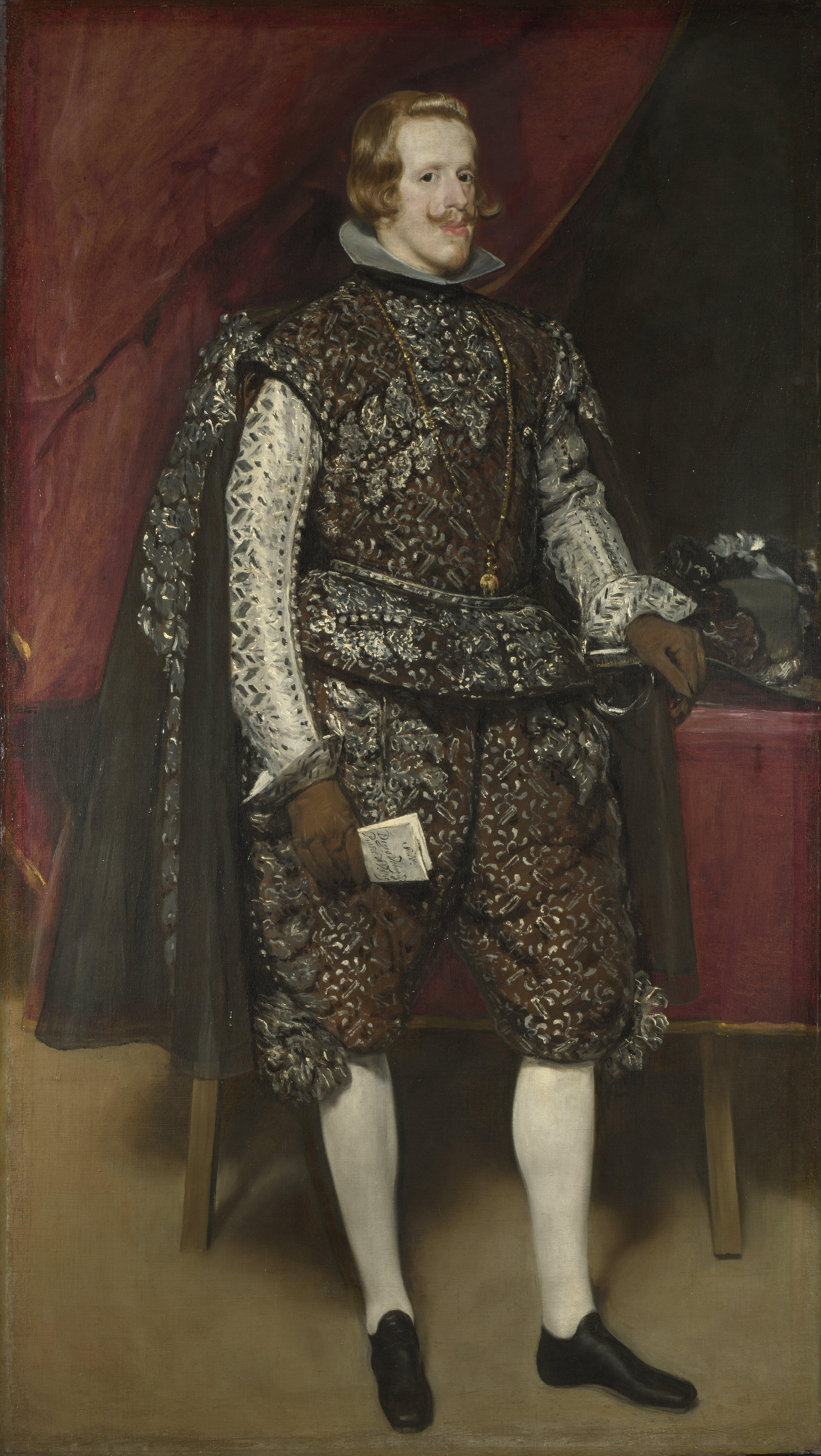
Philip IV in Brown and Silver, a c. 1631–1632 portrait made during the height of his success

Philip was to reign through the majority of the Thirty Years' War in Europe, a turbulent period of military history. In Philip III's final years, Baltasar de Zúñiga had convinced him to intervene militarily in Bohemia and the Electoral Palatinate on the side of Ferdinand II, Holy Roman Emperor. Once Philip himself came to power, he was convinced by de Zúñiga, appointed his principal foreign minister, and Olivares that he should commit Spain to a more aggressive foreign policy in alliance with the Holy Roman Empire. This led Philip to renew hostilities with the Dutch in 1621 in an attempt to bring the provinces to the negotiating table with the aim of achieving a peace treaty favourable to Spanish global interests. Philip's government pursued a 'Netherlands first' strategy throughout the war until 1643. Despite this shift in policy, Philip does not seem to have been particularly bellicose; early on he noted that having inherited such a large empire, war somewhere across his domains was an inevitable condition, and he appeared genuinely upset when he came to power and contemplated how much the people of Castile had paid 'in blood' to support the wars of his royal predecessors.

The 1620s were good years for Spanish foreign policy: the war with the Dutch went well, albeit at great expense, culminating in the retaking of the key city of Breda in 1624. By the end of the decade, Philip's government was faced with the question of whether to prioritise the war in Flanders or Spain's relationship with France during the War of the Mantuan Succession (1628–1631). Philip's advisors recommended prioritising the war in Flanders, taking action to safeguard the Spanish Road to the Netherlands but at the cost of antagonising Louis XIII. Strategically this was to prove a disaster. Despite fresh Spanish successes in the mid-1630s – in particular, the triumph of Philip's government in raising a fresh Spanish army, marching it into Germany to defeat the Swedish-led Protestant forces at the Battle of Nördlingen (1634) – the increased tensions with France made war between the two Catholic states increasingly inevitable. Olivares advised Philip that the coming war with France would be all or nothing; Spain would win or fall by the result.

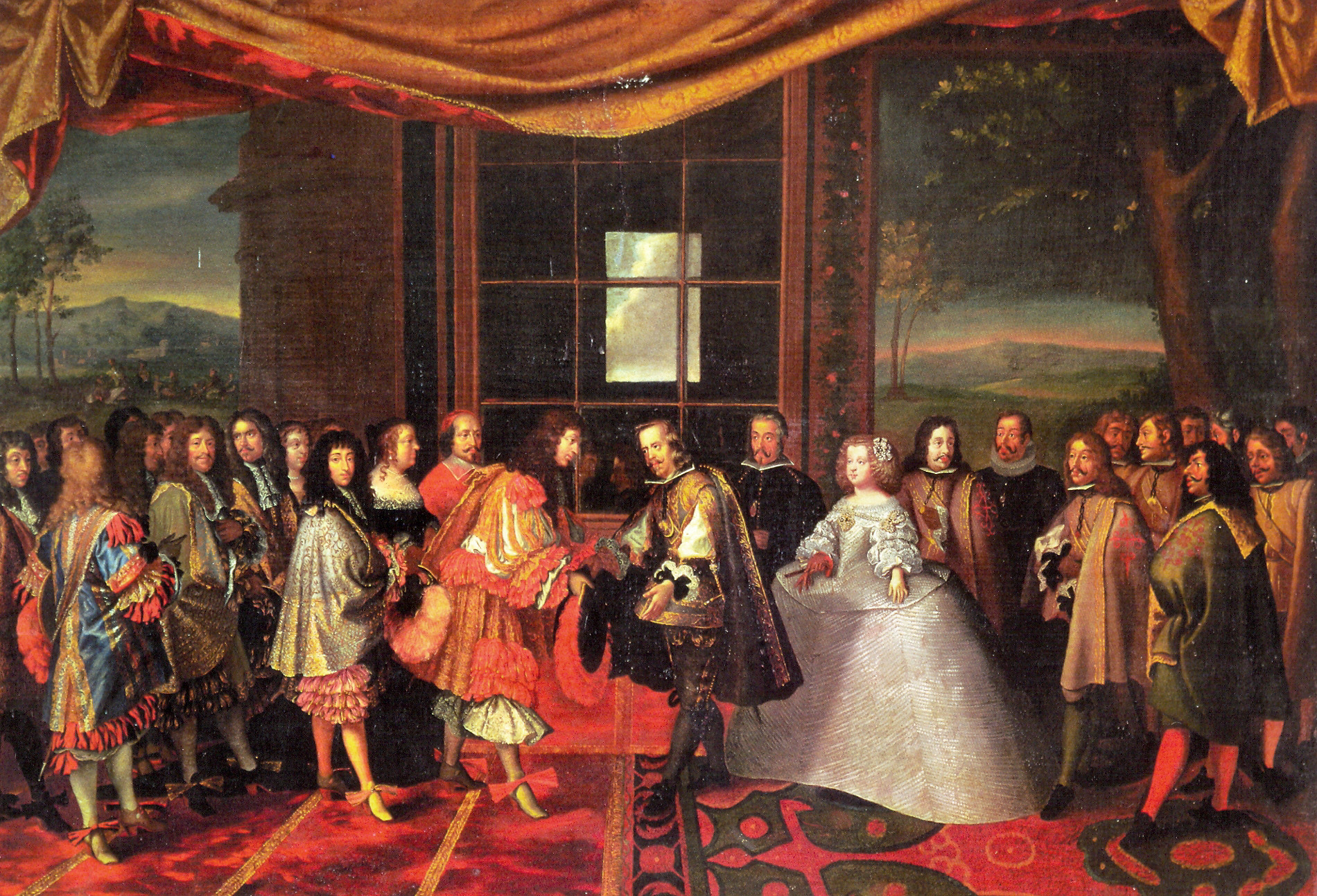
Louis XIV and Philip IV at the Meeting on the Isle of Pheasants, June 1660

The Spanish-French war that ensued from 1635 onwards was not a foregone conclusion. Early Spanish successes threatened Paris, and even after the Spanish defeat at Rocroi, Spain remained a strong opponent. But from 1640 onwards, a period which saw large-scale revolts across Spanish territories in protest against the rising costs of the conflict, Spain was finding it difficult to sustain the war. Philip reacted to the increased French threat by finally abandoning his 'Netherlands first' strategy; resources for the Army of Flanders were savagely cut, and the fight against the French-supported rebels in Catalonia took the first priority.

Shortly after Rocroi, Philip – now having had to dismiss his favourite, Olivares – issued instructions to his ambassadors to seek a peace treaty. The Peace of Westphalia, delivered by Olivares' replacement Luis de Haro, resolved the long-running Eighty Years' War in the Netherlands and the wars in Germany, but the conflict with France dragged on. Philip responded to the perceived weakness of France during the Fronde rebellions of 1648 by continuing the fight; he took personal responsibility for the decision to start a fresh, and ultimately successful, offensive against the French in Catalonia in 1651.

True victory over France never emerged, however, and by 1658, after the loss of Dunkirk to an Anglo-French force, Philip was personally desperate for peace. The Treaty of the Pyrenees in 1659, and the marriage of Philip's daughter Maria Theresa to the young King Louis XIV finally brought the war with France to a conclusion. The war against Portugal continued, however, as Philip fruitlessly attempted to regain control over his lost kingdom.

== Philip and the Spanish military ==
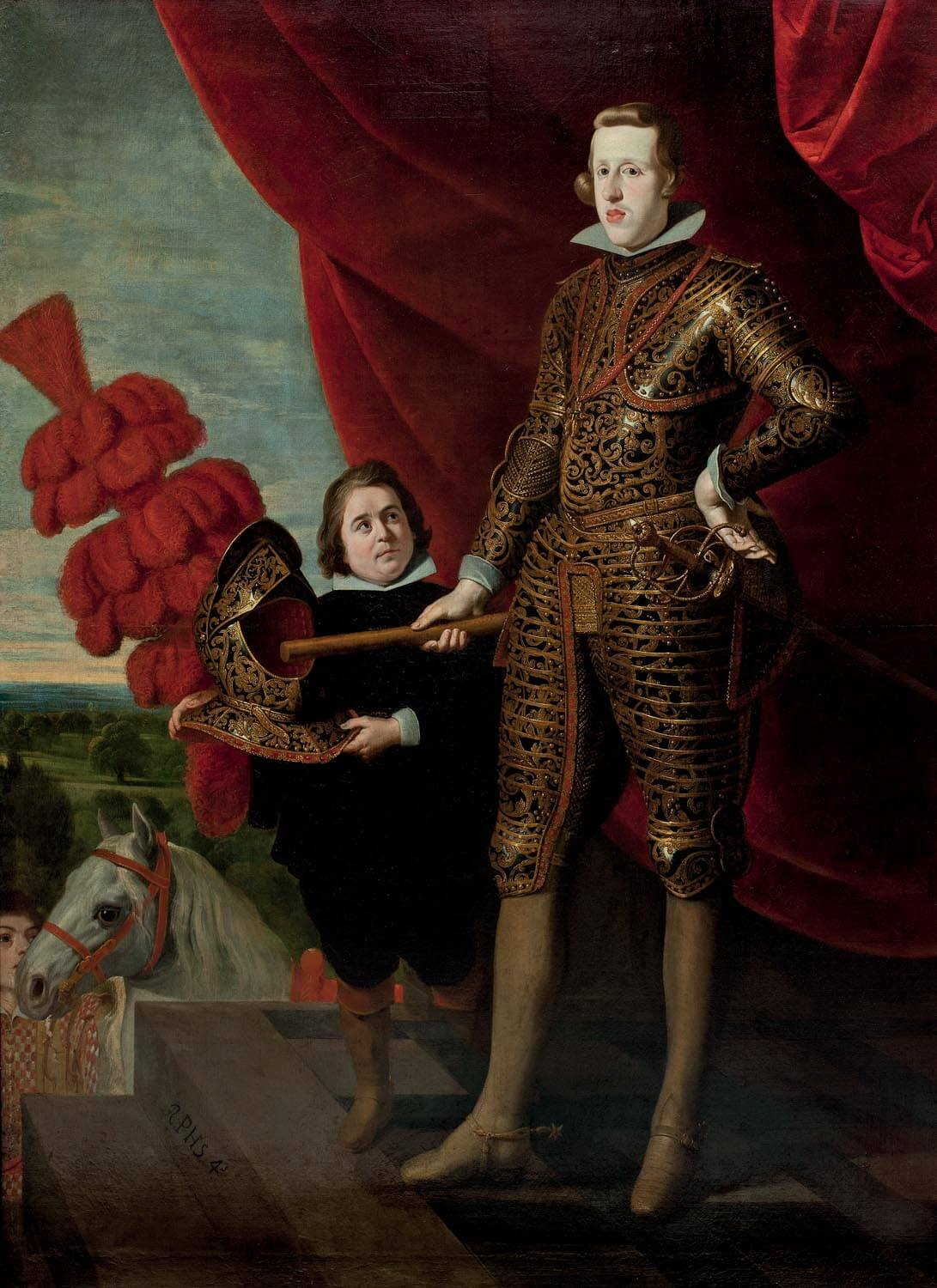
Philip dressed as a cuirassier, accompanied by a court dwarf, by Caspar de Crayer

Philip and Olivares attempted to address the perceived issues of the army, which they concluded were primarily due to the falta de cabezas, or a lack of leadership. In keeping with their wider agenda of renewing the concepts of duty, service and aristocratic tradition, the King agreed to efforts to introduce more grandees into the higher ranks of the military, working hard to overcome the reluctance of many to take up field appointments in the Netherlands and elsewhere.

The results were not entirely as hoped. The grandees dragooned into service in this way were disinclined to spend years learning the normal professional military skill set; they wished 'to start out as generals and soldiers on the same day', to quote one disgruntled career soldier. By the 1630s, the King was waiving the usual rules to enable promotion to higher ranks on a shorter timescale, and having to pay significantly inflated salaries to get grandees to take up even these appointments. The performance of these officers at battles such as Rocroi left much to be desired.

=== Spanish Navy ===
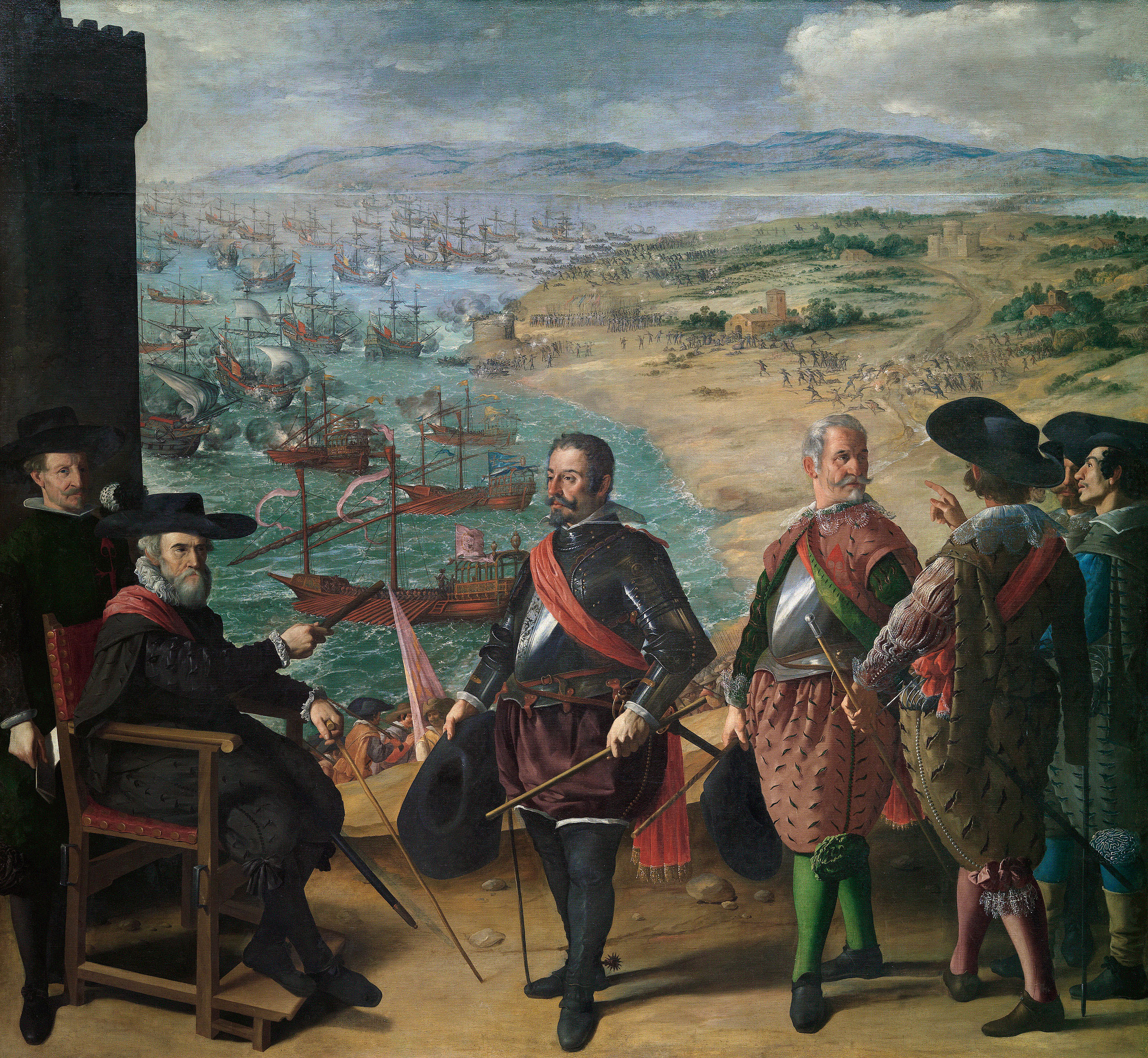
Defense of Cádiz against the English in 1625

Philip was also notable for his interest in the Spanish Navy. Shortly after taking power, he began to increase the size of his fleets, rapidly doubling the size of the naval budget from the start of his reign, and then tripling it. Philip is credited with a 'sensible, pragmatic approach' to provisioning and controlling it. He was prepared to involve himself in considerable details of naval policy; he was commenting on the detail of provisions for the armada in 1630, for example. The Junta de Armadas was the only junta committee to survive the fall of Olivares intact. Even after the disastrous Battle of the Downs, Philip remained closely interested in his navy, including ensuring ministerial attention. In 1646, de Haro was personally involved in supplying and equipping the Atlantic fleet from Cádiz. Throughout the period there was no 'weakening of the importance attached to naval forces' by the King, who argued that joint land and naval operations were essential. Some of his conclusions on naval policy were quite advanced: after the peace of 1648, Philip argued that the Dutch fleets off the Spanish peninsula were actually good for trade, despite concerns from his senior officials, since they provided protection against the English and French navies.

== Domestic policy and the crisis of the monarchy ==
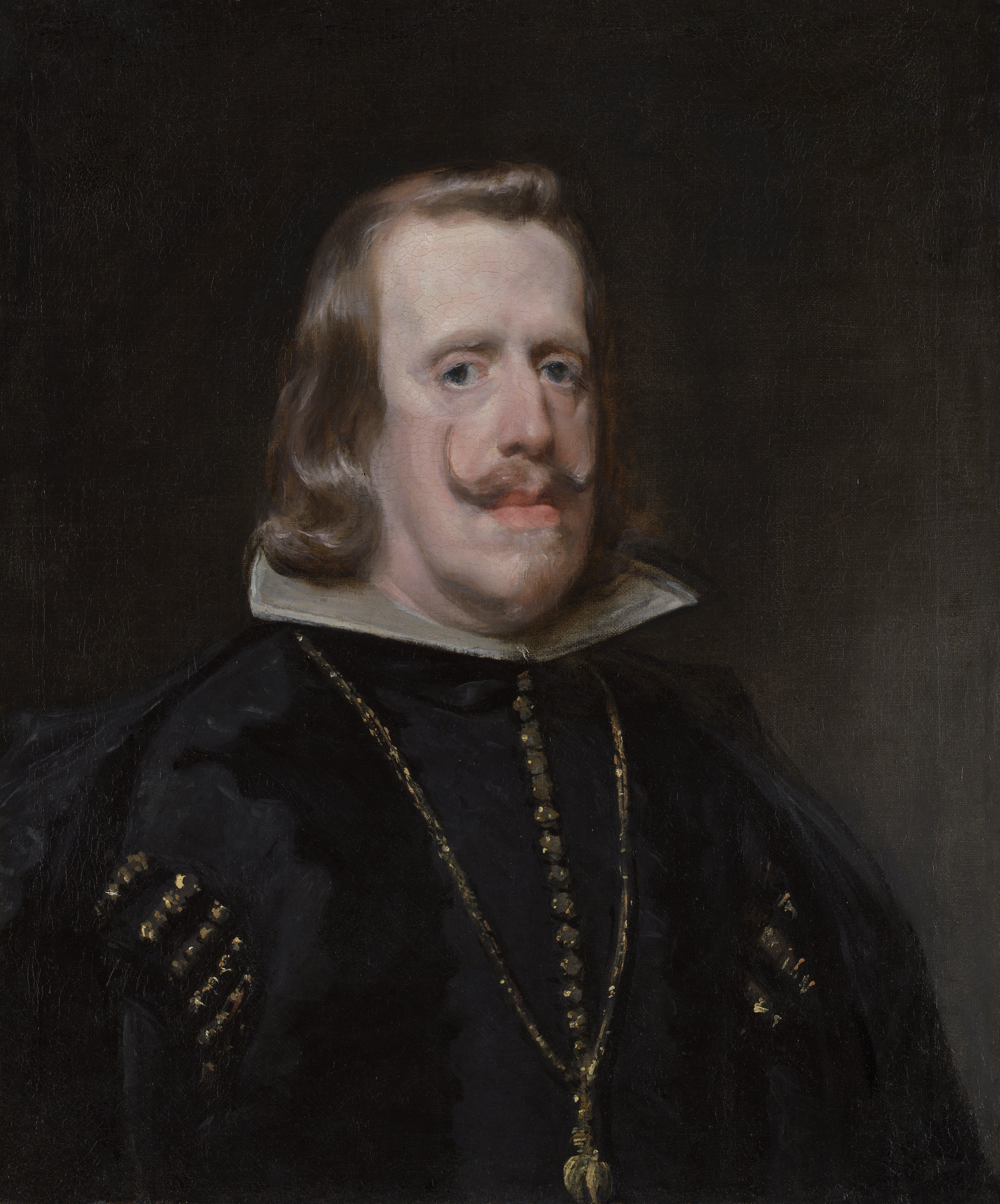
A 1656 portrait of Philip

Philip had inherited a huge empire from his father, spanning the known world, but many of his most difficult challenges as king would stem from domestic problems in Spain itself. Spain in the early 17th century was a collection of possessions – the Crown of Castile (including the Four Kingdoms of Andalusia and Navarre), the Crown of Aragon composed by the kingdoms of Aragon, Valencia, Mallorca and the Principality of Catalonia, and the Kingdom of Portugal, complete with the wider realms of Naples, the Netherlands, Milan etc. – all loosely joined together through the institution of the Castile monarchy and the person of Philip IV. Each part had different taxation, privileges and military arrangements; in practice, the level of taxation in many of the more peripheral provinces was less than that in Castile, but the privileged position of the Castilian nobility at all senior levels of royal appointment was a contentious issue for the less favoured provinces. This loose system had successfully resisted reform and higher taxation before, ironically resulting in Spain's having had historically, up until the 1640s at least, fewer than the usual number of fiscal revolts for an early modern European state.

In the first years of his reign, heavily influenced by his royal favourite Olivares, Philip focused on efforts to reform the most chaotic aspects of this system. Frustrated by the notorious slowness of the system of royal councils, Philip supported Olivares' establishment of juntas – small committees designed to circumvent the more formal system and to enact policies quickly. Although successful, these juntas excluded a number of the traditional grandees and caused resentment.

Olivares put forward the idea of a Unión de Armas, or 'Union of Arms'. This would have involved establishing a force of 140,000 paid soldiers, supported by equitable taxes from across the Empire, and has been termed 'the most far-sighted proposal of any statesman of the age'. In practice, it met fierce opposition from the various regional assemblies and the plan was withdrawn. During the 1620s, again influenced by a desire to reform Spanish life for the better, Philip also passed considerable legislation with puritanical overtones. In 1623, he closed all the legal brothels in Spain, extended the dormant sumptuary laws on luxury goods and supported Papal efforts to regulate priests' sexual behaviour more tightly.

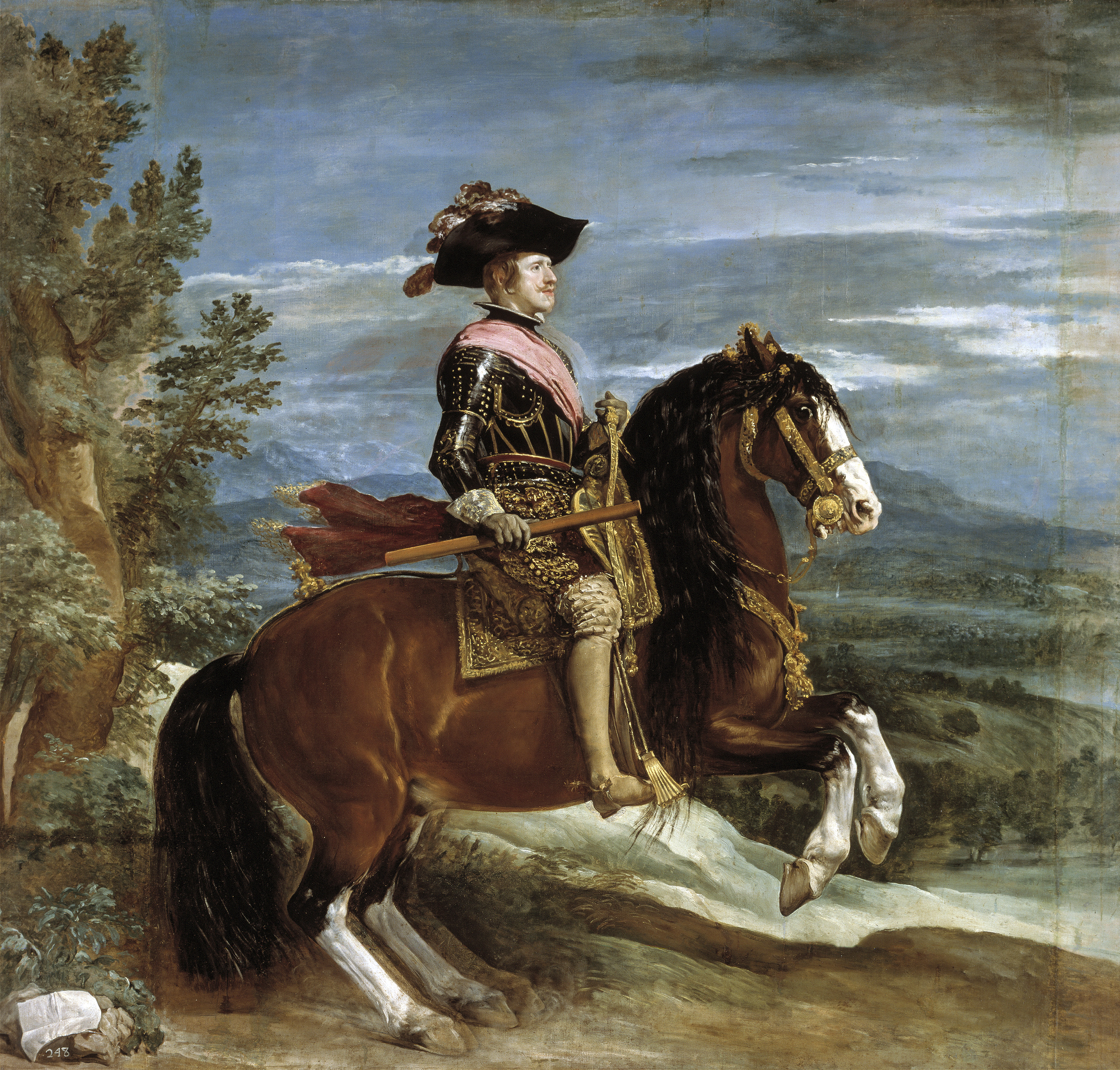
Equestrian portrait of Philip IV

Philip had clear intentions to try to control the Spanish currency, which had become increasingly unstable during the reign of his father and grandfather, but in practice, inflation soared. Partly this was because in 1627 Olivares had attempted to deal with the problem of Philip's Genoese bankers – who had proved uncooperative in recent years – by declaring a state bankruptcy. With the Genoese debt now removed, Olivares hoped to turn to indigenous bankers for renewed funds. In practice, the plan was a disaster. The Spanish treasure fleet of 1628 was captured by the Dutch, and Spain's ability to borrow and transfer money across Europe declined sharply.

By the 1630s, Philip's domestic policies were being increasingly impacted by the financial pressures of the Thirty Years' War, and in particular the growing war with France. The costs of the war were huge, and whilst they had largely fallen upon Castile, the ability of the crown to raise more funds and men from this source was increasingly limited. Philip and his government were desperately trying to reduce the responsibilities of the central government in response to the overstretch of the war, and various reform ideas that might have been pursued during the 1620s were rejected on this basis. Financial restraints and higher taxes were put in place, but Philip was increasingly selling off regalian and feudal rights, along with much of the royal estate to fund the conflict. It has been argued that the fiscal stringencies of the 1630s, combined with the strength and role of Olivares and the juntas, effectively cut Philip off from the three traditional pillars of support for the monarchy: the grandees, the Church and the Council of Castile.

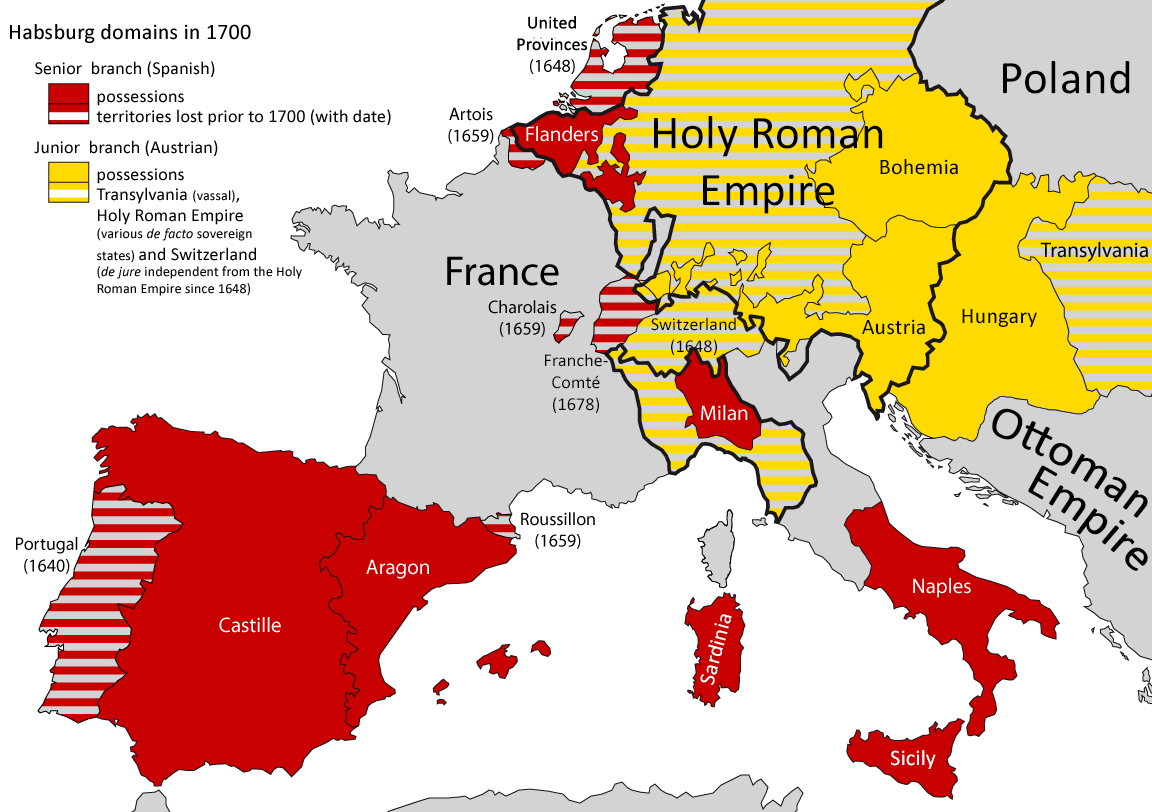
Habsburg possessions in Spain (red), and Austria (yellow)

A crisis came in 1640. An attempt by Olivares to intervene in Catalonia to deal with the French invasion threat resulted in revolt and the years long Reapers' War. An alliance of Catalan rebels and French royal forces proved challenging to suppress, and in trying to mobilise Portuguese noble support for the war, Olivares triggered a second uprising. Lisbon's nobles expelled Philip, and gave the throne to the House of Braganza, marking the end of sixty years of the Iberian Union and the beginning of the Portuguese Restoration War. He was succeeded in Portugal in 1640 by John IV.

In 1641, Gaspar Alfonso Pérez de Guzmán, 9th Duke of Medina Sidonia attempted another rebellion against Philip from Andalusia, possibly attempting to reproduce the Braganzas' success in Portugal. Although Philip and Olivares were able to repress the ducal revolt, Philip had found himself increasingly isolated. On his return from Zaragoza, where he had been commanding the army, he found only one of the Castilian nobility arrived at court on Easter Day 1641. The threat of Philip's being deposed by the grandees of Castile seemed increasingly real.

Much shaken by events, Philip's solution was to remove his royal favourite Olivares from office in 1643 in an attempt to compromise with the Spanish elite. He announced he would rule alone, rejecting both the concept of a royal favourite as first minister and the system of junta government, which he began to dismantle in favour of the older system of royal councils. Clemency was shown to the Duke of Medina Sidonia. The situation began to stabilise, and before long Philip felt secure enough to revert to his preferred method of government. Luis de Haro, Olivares' nephew, took over as favourite and minister and the counter-reform of the juntas halted. The spark of reform from Philip's earlier years never returned, however. The Catalan rebellion dragged on for several years. In 1652, the Spanish army retook Barcelona and Philip issued an amnesty for the rebels, promising to respect traditional customs and rights in the future.

== Patronage of the arts ==
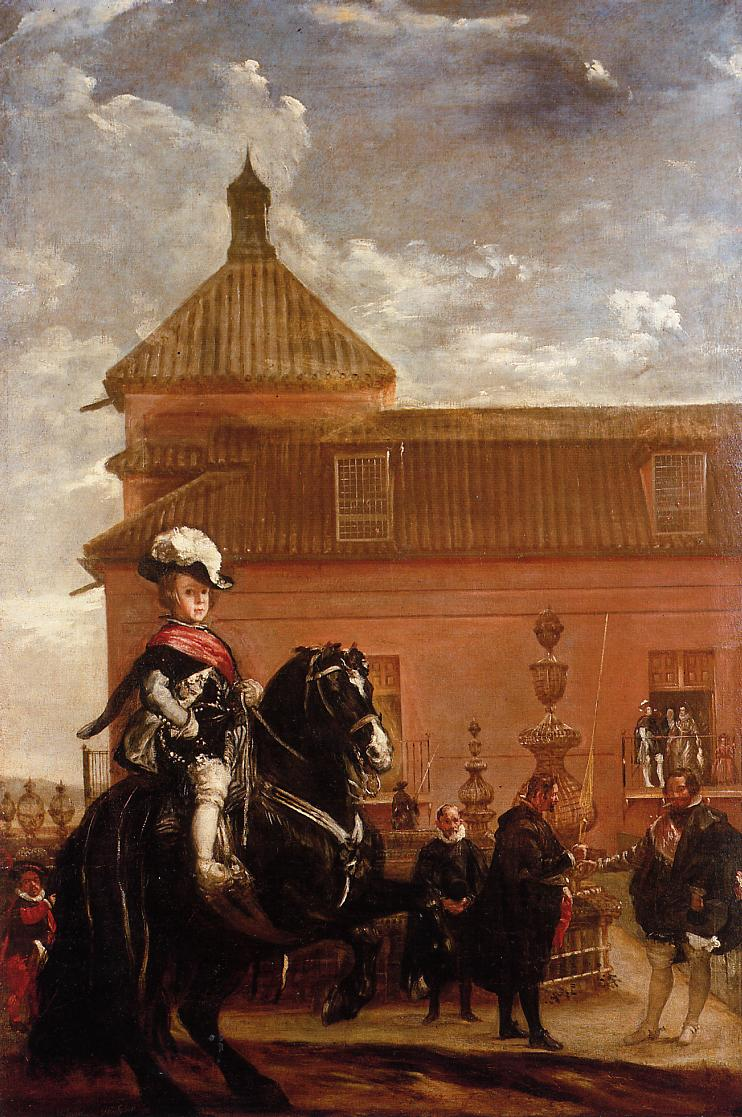
A 1636 portrait of Balthasar Charles, Prince of Asturias with the Count-Duke of Olivares outside the Buen Retiro Palace

Philip has been remembered both for the 'astonishing enthusiasm' with which he collected art and for his love of theatre. On the stage, he favoured Lope de Vega, Pedro Calderón de la Barca, and other distinguished dramatists. Philip has been credited with a share in the composition of several comedies. Court theatre used perspective scenery, a new invention from Italy not used in commercial theatre at the time. Some writers have likened the illusion of Baroque royal theatre to the illusion of kingly power the performances were designed to reinforce. Some recent scholarship has suggested that Philip's financial sponsorship of playwrights, however, may have been less extensive than once thought.

Artistically, Philip became famous for his patronage of his court painter Diego Velázquez, who originated from Seville; mutual contacts caused him to become known to Olivares, who came from the same region. Velázquez was summoned to Madrid by the King in 1624. Despite some jealousy from the existing court painters, Velázquez rapidly became a success with Philip, being retained for the rest of his career until his death, painting a celebration of the Treaty of the Pyrenees for Philip. The King and Velázquez shared common interests in horses, dogs and art, and in private they formed an easy, relaxed relationship over the years. Philip supported a number of other prominent painters, including Eugenio Caxés, Vincenzo Carducci, Gonzales Coques and Angelo Nardi. Philip obtained paintings from across Europe, especially Italy, accumulating over 4,000 by the time of his death; some have termed this unparalleled assemblage a 'mega-collection'.

Philip was nicknamed el Rey Planeta, the 'Planet King', by his contemporaries, and much of the art and display at his court has been interpreted in the context of his need to project power and authority, over both Spaniards and foreigners alike. Older interpretations, which perceived Philip's court as being completely decadent, have been largely superseded, but the art and symbolism of the period certainly did not reflect the wider threat and decline of Spanish power. Indeed, the limited Spanish military successes of the period were celebrated by royal artists to a disproportionate extent. Numerous artists from the Spanish Netherlands produced work extolling the Army of Flanders, including Sebastian Vrancx, Peter Snayers, Jan Miense Molenaer and Willem Hondius. The re-capture of Breda alone resulted in major works by Velázquez and the French etcher Jacques Callot, in addition to various plays and books.

The 'Planet King' also invested in a new palace to display both his art and the ritual of court. Through Olivares, Philip commenced the building of the Buen Retiro Palace in Madrid, parts of which still remain near the Prado. Work began modestly in 1631, with the magnificent, if costly, 'Hall of Thrones', completed by 1635. The palace included its own 'theatre, ballroom, galleries, bull ring, gardens, and artificial lakes', and became the centre for artists and dramatists from across Europe. The palace was built during one of the more difficult periods of Philip's reign. Given both its cost, in a time of stringent wartime savings, and the protest that ensued from a disgruntled public, it is considered to have been an important part of the attempt to communicate royal grandeur and authority.

== Philip and religion ==
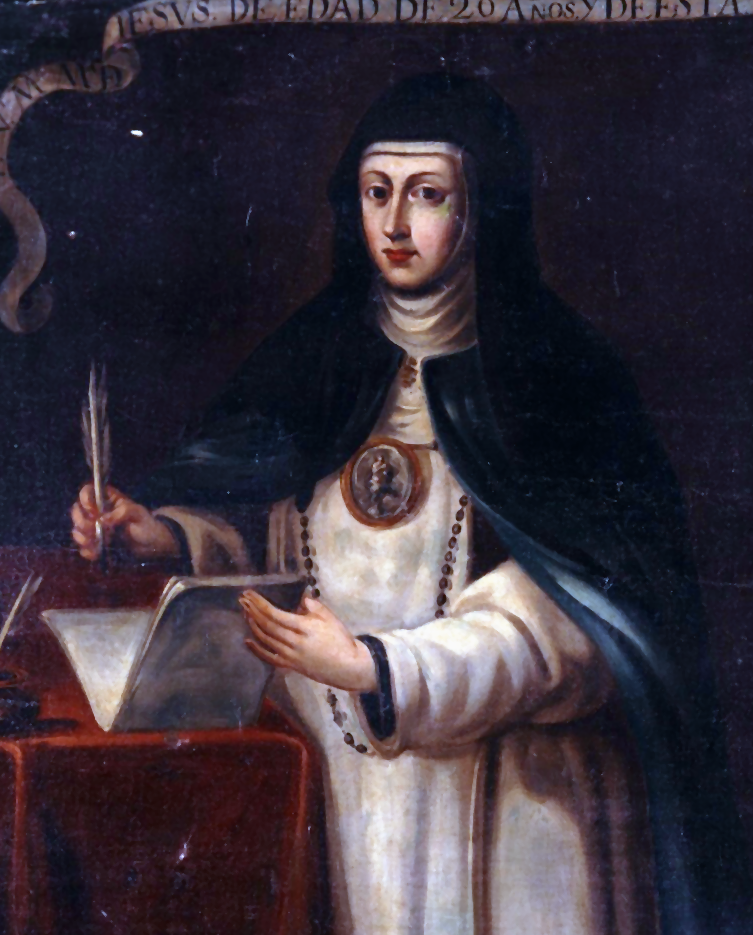
María de Ágreda, a religious advisor to Philip IV during the second half of his reign

The Catholic religion and its rituals played an important part in Philip's life, especially towards the end of his reign. Depressed by events across his domains, he became increasingly concerned with religious affairs. In particular, Philip paid special devotion to a painting of the Nuestra Señora del Milagro, the Virgin of Miracles; the painting was said to miraculously raise and lower its eyes in response to prayer. Whilst married to Elisabeth, Philip had placed their children under the protection of this image; married to Mariana, they undertook special religious ceremonies together under the gaze of the painting. Philip also had a large standard made with the image of the painting on one side and the royal coat of arms on the other, brought out in processions each year on 12 July. As well as marking a strong personal religious belief, this increasingly visible link between the crown, the Church and national symbols such as the Virgin of Miracles, represented a key pillar of support for Philip as king.

Monarchs during the period also had a key role in the canonization process and could utilise this for domestic or international political effect. Philip, for example, keen to reach out to his Portuguese subjects, put his considerable influence behind the case for Isabella of Portugal, a 14th-century role model of a 'perfect queen', to great effect, ultimately paying for a lavish celebration in Lisbon after her canonisation in 1625. Internationally, it was important for Spanish prestige for her to receive at least a proportionate and ideally greater, share of new saints than other Catholic kingdoms, and Philip sponsored a flurry of texts and books supporting Spain's candidates, particularly in competition with Catholic France.

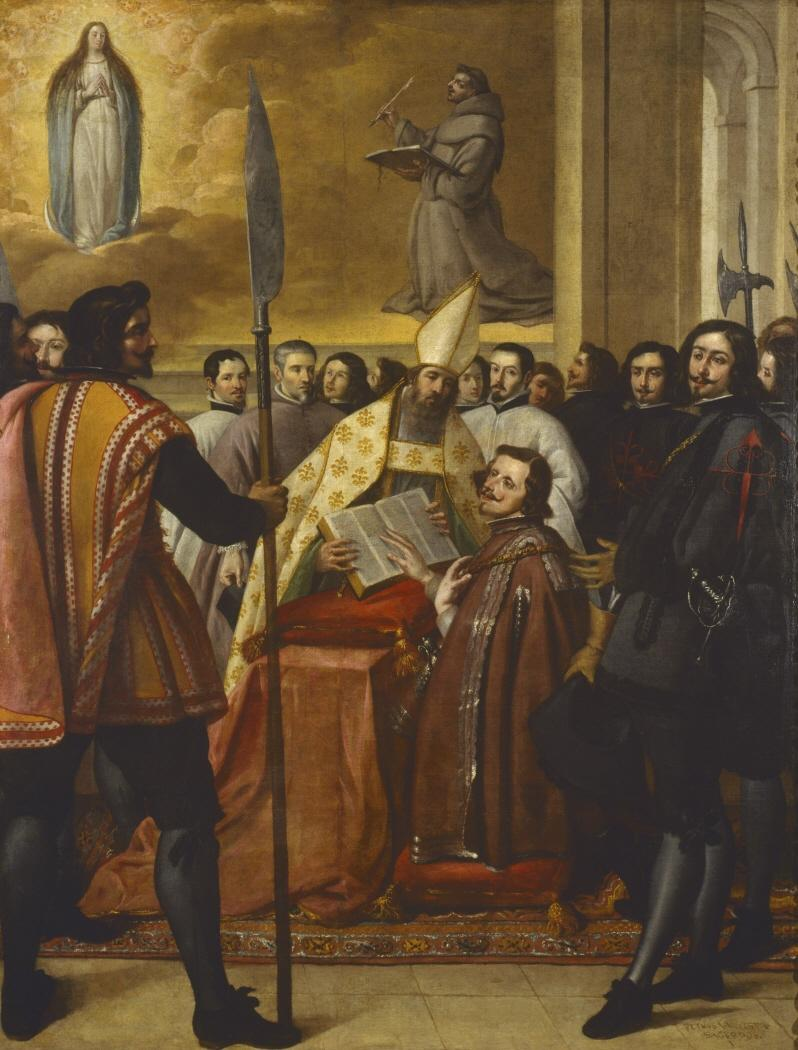
Philip swearing to defend the doctrine of the Immaculate Conception

During the emergency of 1640–1643, Philip appears to have had a crisis of faith. Philip genuinely believed the success or failure of his policies represented God's favour and judgement on his actions. The combination of the revolts, the French advances and the loss of his trusted favourite Olivares appears to have deeply shaken him. Queen Isabella and the new president of the Council of Castile, Don Juan Chumacero – both involved in the removal of Olivares – encouraged the King to invite mystics and visionaries from across Europe to his court at Zaragoza. The mystics' principal advice centred on the importance of the King rejecting Olivares' replacement, de Haro and the remaining pro-Olivares nobles at court. The various mystics were not acceptable to broader Spanish noble opinion and, with de Haro's encouragement, they were ultimately dismissed.

Instead, Philip turned to a better-established female mystic, Sister María de Ágreda, a prioress known for her religious writings. He asked her to correspond with him and to advise him in spiritual matters. The two became regular correspondents throughout the remainder of their lives. This is documented in over 600 confidential letters between them over a period of twenty-two years. Philip clearly believed that Maria could intercede with God on his behalf and provide advice on what God wished him to do, to improve Spain's failing fortunes. Most believe that Philip was involved in protecting Maria from the Inquisition's investigation of 1650. Philip's son, Charles II, also protected her writings from later censorship.

== Titles and style ==
In the Treaty of Madrid (1630), Philip was styled "Philip, by the grace of God king of the Spains, Both the Sicilies, Jerusalem, the Indies, etc., archduke of Austria, duke of Burgundy, Milan, etc., count of Habsburg, Tyrol, etc." in full and "the Most Serene Philip IV, Catholic King of the Spains," for short.

In the Treaty of Münster (1648), he was styled "Don Philip the Fourth, by the grace of God king of Castile, Leon, Aragon, the Two Sicilies, Jerusalem, Navarre, Granada, Toledo, Valencia, Galicia, Majorca, Minorca, Seville, Sardinia, Cordoba, Corsica, Murcia, Jaen, Algeciras, Gibraltar, the Canary Islands, the Eastern and Western Indies, the islands and terra firma of the Ocean, archduke of Austria, duke of Burgundy, Brabant, Milan, count of Habsburg, Flanders, Tyrol, Barcelona, lord of Biscay and Molina, etc." in full and "King of the Spains, Don Philip the Fourth and King of Portugal and the Algarves Don Philip the Third", for short.

After the Great Potosí Mint Fraud of 1649, between 1651 and 1652, the mint of Pamplona issued coins with the text Philippus Dei Gratia Castelle et Navarrae rex ("Philip king of Castile and Navarre by the grace of God"). The Cortes of Navarre protested this offence to the charter of Navarre. The king then compensated in 1652 with a short issue of coins with the text Philippus Sextus dei Gratia Navarrae rex ("Philip the Sixth king of Navarre by the grace of God").

== Legacy ==
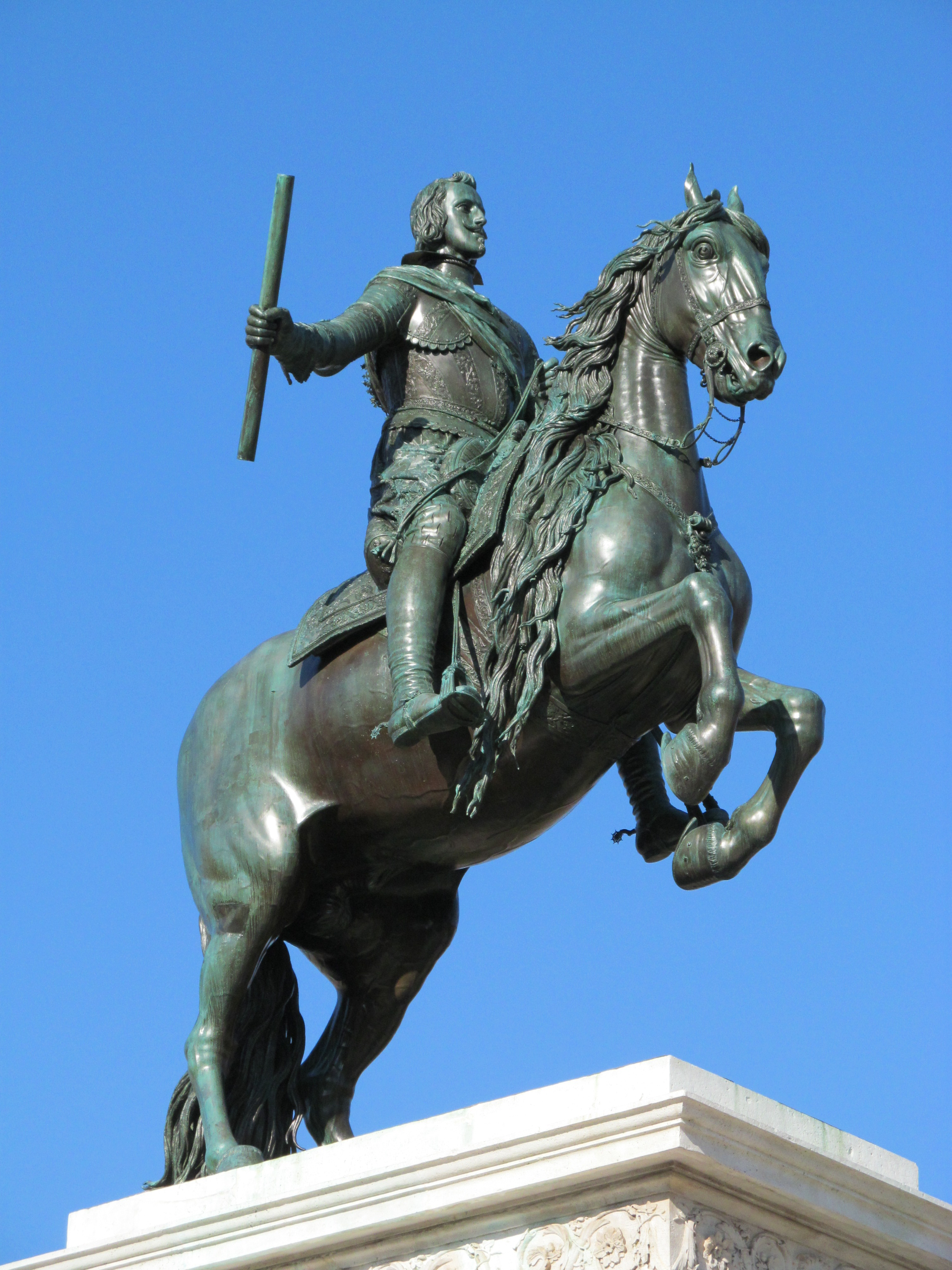
The Monument to Philip IV of Spain at the Plaza de Oriente

Philip IV's reign, after a few years of inconclusive successes, was characterized by political and military adversity. He has been held responsible for the decline of Spain, which was mainly due to organic causes largely beyond the control of any one ruler. Philip IV died in 1665, expressing the pious hope that his surviving son, Charles II, who was only 4 years old at the time, would be more fortunate than himself. On his death, a catafalque was built in Rome to commemorate his life. In his will, Philip left political power as regent on behalf of the young Charles II to his wife Mariana, with instructions that she heed the advice of a small junta committee established for this purpose. This committee excluded John Joseph, Philip's illegitimate son, resulting in a chaotic power play between Mariana and John Joseph until his death in 1679.

== Family ==
- With Elisabeth of France (1602–1644, daughter of Henry IV of France) — married 18 October 1615 at Bordeaux:
  - Maria Margaret of Austria, Infanta of Spain (14 August 1621 – 15 August 1621), died at a day old and was buried at El Escorial
  - Margaret Maria Catherine of Austria, Infanta of Spain (25 November 1623 – 22 December 1623), died at a month old and was buried at El Escorial
  - Maria Eugenia of Austria, Infanta of Spain (21 November 1625 – 21 August 1627), died at 1 and was buried at El Escorial.
  - Isabella Maria Theresa of Austria, Infanta of Spain (31 October 1627 – 1 November 1627 also died at a day old and buried at El Escorial as her three older sisters Maria Eugenia, Margaret Maria Catherine and Maria Margaret were.)
  - Balthasar Charles of Austria, Infante of Spain, Prince of Asturias (17 October 1629 – 9 October 1646), Prince of Asturias.
  - Maria Anna "Mariana" Antonia of Austria, Infanta of Spain (17 January 1636 – 5 December 1636 died at 12 months old and was buried at El Escorial with her four older sisters, last child of Philip IV of Spain to die in early childhood or infancy by his first wife Isabella of Bourbon.)
  - Maria Theresa of Austria, Infanta of Spain (1638–1683), married Louis XIV of France and had issue.
- With Archduchess Maria Anna of Austria (1634–1696) – his niece – married 1649:
  - Margaret Theresa of Austria, Infanta of Spain (12 July 1651 – 12 March 1673), married Leopold I, Holy Roman Emperor
  - Maria Ambrosia de la Concepción Enrichetta Theresa of Austria, Infanta of Spain (7 December 1655 – 21 December 1655)
  - Philip Prospero of Austria, Infante of Spain, Prince of Asturias (28 November 1657 – 1 November 1661)
  - Ferdinand Thomas Charles of Austria, Infante of Spain (23 December 1658 – 22 October 1659)
  - Charles II of Spain (6 November 1661 – 1 November 1700) married Marie Louise d'Orléans, no issue. Married secondly Maria Anna of Neuburg, no issue.

King Philip IV had many extramarital affairs, and an unknown but large number of illegitimate children, estimated around thirty. Only two were legitimized.

- With María Manrique, daughter of the marqués de Charela
  - Fernando Francisco Isidro de Austria (15 May 1626 – 12 March 1634), legitimized after his death and buried at El Escorial
- With María Calderón:
  - John Joseph of Austria (7 April 1629 – 17 September 1679), legitimized in 1642.
- Never legitimized:
  - Carlos Fernando de Austria y Manrique (1639-1696), married, one daughter.
  - Alonso Antonio de San Martín (1636-1705), Bishop of Oviedo and of Cuenca.
  - Ana Margarita de Austria (1641-1699), Prioress of the Royal Monastery of La Encarnación.
  - Alfonso Enríquez de Santo Tomás (1631-1692), Bishop of Málaga.
  - Fernando Valdés (1638-1702), married, Governor of Novara in Italy.
  - Juan Cossío (1640-1701), Augustinian monk.

== Ancestry ==
Ancestors of Philip IV of Spain

Philip I King of Castile (Note: Charles V, Holy Roman Emperor at the Encyclopædia Britannica); 1478–1506	Joanna; Queen of Castile; 1479–1555
Isabella of Portugal; 1503–39	Charles V Holy Roman Emperor; 1500–58	Ferdinand I Holy Roman Emperor (Note: Press, Volker (1990). "Maximilian II.". Neue Deutsche Biographie (in German). Vol. 16. Berlin: Duncker & Humblot. pp. 471–475. (full text online).); 1503–64	Anna of Bohemia and Hungary; 1503–47
Maria of Spain; 1528–1603	Maximilian II; Holy Roman Emperor; 1527–76	Anna of Austria; 1528–90	Albert V Duke of Bavaria; 1528–1579
Philip II; King of Spain; 1527–98	Anna of Austria; 1549–80	Charles II; Archduke of Austria (Note: Eder, Karl (1961). "Ferdinand II.". Neue Deutsche Biographie (in German). Vol. 5. Berlin: Duncker & Humblot. pp. 83–85. (full text online).); 1540–90	Maria Anna of Bavaria; 1551–1608
Philip III; King of Spain; 1578–1621	Margaret of Austria; 1584–1611
Philip IV; King of Spain; 1605–65

== Male-line family tree ==
House of Habsburg

Original line
Albert; Count of Habsburg c. 1188–1239
Rudolf I of Germany c. 1218–1291
Albert I of Germany; 1255–1308	Hartmann; 1263–1281	Rudolf II; Duke of Austria; 1270–1290
Rudolf I of Bohemia; 1281–1307	Frederick the Fair c. 1289–1330	Leopold I Duke of Austria; 1290–1326	Albert II; Duke of Austria; 1298–1358	Henry the Friendly; 1299–1327	Otto; Duke of Austria; 1301–1339	John; Parricida c. 1290–1312/1313
Albertinian line	Leopoldian line
Rudolf IV; Duke of Austria; 1339–1365	Frederick III; 1347–1362	Albert III; Duke of Austria; 1349–1395	Leopold III; Duke of Austria; 1351–1386	Frederick II; Duke of Austria; 1327–1344	Leopold II; Duke of Austria; 1328–1344
Albert IV; Duke of Austria; 1377–1404	William; Duke of Austria c. 1370–1406	Leopold IV; Duke of Austria; 1371–1411	Ernest; Duke of Austria; 1377–1424	Frederick IV; Duke of Austria; 1382–1439
Albert II of Germany; 1397–1439	Frederick III; HRE; 1415–1493	Albert VI; Archduke of Austria; 1418–1463	Sigismund; Archduke of Austria; 1427–1496
Ladislaus the Posthumous; 1440–1457	Maximilian I HRE; 1459–1519
Philip I of Castile; 1478–1506
Spanish / Iberian line	Austrian / HRE line
Charles V HRE; 1500–1558	Ferdinand I HRE; 1503–1564
Philip II of Spain; 1527–1598	Maximilian II; HRE; 1527–1576	Ferdinand II; Archduke of Austria; 1529–1595	Charles II; Archduke of Austria; 1540–1590
Carlos; Prince of Asturias; 1545–1568	Philip III of Spain; 1578–1621	Rudolf II; HRE; 1552–1612	Ernest of Austria; 1553–1595	Matthias; HRE; 1557–1619	Maximilian III; Archduke of Austria; 1558–1618	Albert VII; Archduke of Austria; 1559–1621	Wenceslaus; Archduke of Austria; 1561–1578	Andrew; Margrave of Burgau; 1558–1600	Charles; Margrave of Burgau; 1560–1618	Ferdinand II; HRE; 1578–1637	Maximilian Ernest of Austria; 1583–1616	Leopold V Archduke of Austria; 1586–1632	Charles of Austria; 1590–1624
Philip IV of Spain; 1605–1665	Charles of Austria; 1607–1632	Ferdinand of Austria; 1609–1641	John-Charles of Austria; 1605–1619	Ferdinand III; HRE; 1608–1657	Leopold Wilhelm of Austria; 1614–1662	Ferdinand Charles; Archduke of Austria; 1628–1662	Sigismund Francis; Archduke of Austria; 1630–1665
Balthasar Charles; Prince of Asturias; 1629–1646	Charles II of Spain; 1661–1700	Ferdinand IV; King of the Romans; 1633–1654	Leopold I HRE; 1640–1705	Charles Joseph of Austria; 1649–1664
Joseph I HRE; 1678–1711	Charles VI; HRE; 1685–1740
Lorraine
Maria Theresa; HRE; 1740–1780	Francis I HRE; 1745–1765
Habsburg-Lorraine
Joseph II; HRE; 1765–1790	Leopold II; HRE; 1790–1792
Francis II; HRE; 1792–1806

== Bibliography ==
- Aercke, Kristiaan P. (1994). The Gods of Play: Baroque Festival Performances as Rhetorical Discourse. Albany: State University of New York Press.
- Anderson, M. S. (1988). War and Society in Europe of the Old Regime, 1618–1789. London: Fontana.
- Jonathan, Brown. "Enemies of Flattery: Velázquez' Portraits of Philip IV". In Rotberg, Robert I; Rabb, Theodore K. (eds.). Art and History: Images and Their Meaning. Cambridge: Cambridge University Press.
- Carter, Charles H. (1963). "The Nature of Spanish Government After Philip II". The Historian. 26 (1): 1–18. doi:10.1111/j.1540-6563.1963.tb00234.x. JSTOR 24442462.
- Corteguera, Luis R. (2002). For the Common Good: Popular Politics in Barcelona, 1580–1640. Ithaca: Cornell University Press.
- Darby, Graham (1994). Spain in the Seventeenth Century. Longman.
- Davenport, France G. (2004). European Treaties Bearing on the History of the United States and Its Dependencies. The Lawbook Exchange, Ltd.
- Elliot, J. H. (1970). "The Statecraft of Olivares". In Elliot; Koenisburger (eds.). The Diversity of History: Essays in Honour of Sir Henry Butterfield. London: Routledge and Kegan Paul.
- Elliot, J. H. (1984). The Revolt of the Catalans: A Study in the Decline of Spain, 1598–1640. Cambridge: Cambridge University Press.
- Elliot, J. H. (1991). Richelieu and Olivares. Cambridge: Canto Press.
- Fernándo-Armesto, Filippe (2000). "The Improbable Empire". In Carr, Raymond (ed.). Spain: A History. Oxford: Oxford University Press.
- Goodman, David (2002). Spanish Naval Power, 1589–1665: Reconstruction and Defeat. Cambridge: Cambridge University Press.
- Goodman, Eleanor (2005). "Conspicuous In Her Absence: Mariana of Austria, Juan José of Austria, and the Representation of Her Power". In Earenfight, Theresa (ed.). Queenship and Political Power in Medieval and Early Modern Spain. Aldershot: Ashgate.
- Haliczer, Stephen (2002). Between Exaltation and Infamy: Female Mystics in the Golden Age of Spain. Oxford: Oxford University Press.
- Hume, Martin (1907). Court of Philip IV: Spain in Decline. New York: G. P. Putnam's Sons.
- Ishikawa, Chiyo (2004). Spain in the Age of Exploration, 1492–1819. University of Nebraska Press.
- Kamen, Henry (2000). "Vicissitudes of a World Power, 1500–1700". In Carr, Raymond (ed.). Spain: A History. Oxford: Oxford University Press.
- Kamen, Henry (2005). Spain, 1469–1714: A Society of Conflict. Harlow: Pearson Education.
- Knox, Giles (2022). Velázquez's King Philip IV of Spain from the Frick Collection. Masterpiece in Residence. Dallas and New York: Meadows Museum, SMU in association with Scala Arts Publishers, Inc.
- Lynch, John (1959). Spain Under the Habsburgs. Vol. 2 Spain and America. pp. 62–145. ISBN 978-0-631-08030-5.
- MacKay, Ruth (1999). The Limits of Royal Authority: Resistance and Obedience in Seventeenth Century Castile. Cambridge: Cambridge University Press.
- Munck, Thomas (1990). Seventeenth Century Europe, 1598–1700. London: Macmillan.
- Parker, Geoffrey (1984). Europe in Crisis, 1598–1648. London: Fontana.
- Parker, Geoffrey (2004). The Army of Flanders and the Spanish Road, 1567–1659. Cambridge: Cambridge University Press.
- Polisensky, J. V. (1971). The Thirty Years War. London: NEL.
- Ringrose, David (1998). Spain, Europe and the "Spanish Miracle", 1700–1900. Cambridge: Cambridge University Press.
- Robbins, Jeremy (1998). The Challenges of Uncertainty: An Introduction to Seventeenth Century Spanish Literature. Lanham: Rowman and Littlefield.
- Stevenson, R. A. M. (1912). Velazquez. London: G. Bell Sons.
- Stradling, R. A. (1988). Philip IV and the Government of Spain, 1621–1665. Cambridge: Cambridge University Press. ISBN 0-521-32333-9.
- Wedgwood, C.V. (1981). The Thirty Years War. London: Methuen.
- Williams, Patrick (2006). The Great Favourite: The Duke of Lerma, and the Court and Government of King Philip III of Spain, 1598–1621. Manchester: Manchester University Press.
- Zagorin, Perez (1992). Rebels and Rulers, 1500–1660. Provincial Rebellion: Revolutionary Civil Wars, 1560–1660. Vol. II. Cambridge: Cambridge University Press.

Philip IV of Spain House of Habsburg Born: 8 April 1605 Died: 17 September 1665
Regnal titles
Preceded by Philip III of Spain	King of Portugal; 31 March 1621 – 1 December 1640	Succeeded by John IV
Preceded by Philip III of Spain	Count of Barcelona; 31 March 1621 – 1641	Succeeded by Louis XIII of France
Preceded by Philip III of Spain	King of Spain, Sardinia, Naples and Sicily; 31 March 1621 – 17 September 1665	Succeeded by Charles II of Spain
Preceded by Philip III of Spain	Duke of Milan; 31 March 1621 – 17 September 1665	Succeeded by Charles II of Spain
Preceded by Louis XIV of France	Count of Barcelona; 1659 – 17 September 1665	Succeeded by Charles II of Spain
Preceded by Albert; Isabella Clara Eugenia	Duke of Brabant, Lothier, Limburg and Luxemburg; Count Palatine of Burgundy; Count of Flanders, Hainaut and Namur; 13 July 1621 – 17 September 1665	Succeeded by Charles II of Spain
Preceded by Albert; Isabella Clara Eugenia	Count of Artois; 13 July 1621 – 7 November 1659	French royal domain
Preceded by Isabella	Prince of Piombino; 1628–1634	Succeeded by Nicholas I
Royal titles
Preceded by Philip	Prince of Asturias; 1605–1621	Succeeded by Balthasar Charles
Preceded by Anne	Prince of Portugal; 1605–1621	Succeeded by Balthasar Charles
