= Rabb (surname) =

Rabb is a surname. Notable people and fictional characters with the name include:

== Real people ==
- Abdur Rabb (politician), member of the 3rd National Assembly of Pakistan
- Chris Rabb (born 1970), American politician
- Ellis Rabb, American actor and director
- George B. Rabb (1930–2017), American zoologist
- Intisar A. Rabb, American legal scholar
- Ivan Rabb (born 1997), American basketball player
- Jerard Rabb (born 1984), American football wide receiver
- Jeremy Rabb, American actor
- John Rabb (born 1960), American baseball catcher
- John Leslie Rabb, former bishop suffragan of the Episcopal Diocese of Maryland
- Johnny Rabb, American drummer and author
- Jonathan Rabb, American writer
- Kate Milner Rabb, American columnist
- Krisztián Rabb (born 2001), Hungarian sabre fencer
- Luther Rabb, American musician
- Maqbool Rabb, Pakistani one-star air officer
- Maurice Rabb Jr., American ophthalmologist
- Maxwell M. Rabb, American lawyer
- P. K. Abdu Rabb, Indian politician
- Robert Lamar Rabb, American entomologist
- Saafir Rabb, business strategist
- Sheila Rabb Weidenfeld, American television producer and press secretary
- Theodore K. Rabb, American historian
- Warren Rabb (born 1937), American football quarterback

== Fictional characters ==
- Harmon Rabb, lead character in the American television series JAG
