= Kingdom of Córdoba =

Realm of the Crown of Castile from 1236 to 1833

Kingdom of Córdoba Reino de Córdoba
- Realm of the Crown of Castile; Region of the Kingdom of Spain
- 1236–1833
- Coat of arms

- Map of the Kingdom of Córdoba, based on the Respuestas Generales del Catastro de Ensenada (1750-54).
  - Type: Manoralism
- History
  - Capture of Córdoba: 1236
  - Territorial division of Spain: 1833
Preceded by	Succeeded by
Almohad Caliphate	Province of Córdoba (Spain); Province of Ciudad Real
- Today part of: Spain

The Kingdom of Córdoba (also Kingdom of Cordova; Spanish: Reino de Córdoba) was a territorial jurisdiction of the Crown of Castile since 1236 until Javier de Burgos' provincial division of Spain in 1833. This was a "kingdom" ("reino") in the second sense given by the Diccionario de la lengua española de la Real Academia Española: the Crown of Castile consisted of several such kingdoms. Córdoba was one of the Four Kingdoms of Andalusia. Its extent is detailed in Respuestas Generales del Catastro de Ensenada (1750-54), which was part of the documentation of a census.

Like the other kingdoms within Spain, the Kingdom of Córdoba was abolished by the 1833 territorial division of Spain.

The Four Kingdoms of Andalusia.

== See also ==
- Córdoba, Spain
- es:Anexo:Localidades del Reino de Córdoba, a list of the localities that composed the Kingdom of Jaén, according to the Catastro of Ensenada (1750-54); this page is an appendix to the Spanish-language Wikipedia.
