= Rabb (disambiguation) =

Rabb is an Arabic-language word that refers to a monotheistic God.

Rabb can also refer to:

== People ==
- Rabb (surname), a family name
- Rabinovitz/Rabb family, American Jewish family known for the Stop & Shop supermarket chain
- William Rabb Beatty, Canadian businessman and politician

== Places in the United States ==
- Rabb, Alabama, an unincorporated community
- Rabb Lake National Wildlife Refuge, in Rolette County, North Dakota
- Rabb, Texas, an unincorporated community

== Other uses ==
- Rabb.it, former video streaming website
- Rabb School of Continuing Studies at Brandeis University
- Icelandic-language word for small talk

== See also ==
- Abd al-Rabb, Arabic-language masculine given name
- Andrew Rabb House, historic house in German Township, Pennsylvania, U.S.
- Rabbs Prairie, Texas, U.S., an unincorporated community
