= Kingdom of Seville =

Realm of the Crown of Castile, 1248–1833

Coordinates: 37.3000°N 6.1167°W

Kingdom of Seville Reino de Sevilla
- Realm of the Crown of Castile
- 1248–1833
- Coat of Arms

- Jurisdictional seigneuries of the Kingdom of Seville according to the Respuestas Generales del Catastro de Ensenada (1750-54).
  - Type: Manoralism
- History
  - Conquest of Seville: 1248
  - Territorial division of Spain: 1833
Preceded by
Almohad Caliphate
Succeeded by
Province of Badajoz
Province of Cádiz
Province of Málaga
Province of Seville
- Today part of: Spain

The Kingdom of Seville (Spanish: Reino de Sevilla) was a territorial jurisdiction of the Crown of Castile from 1248 until Javier de Burgos' provincial division of Spain in 1833. This was a "kingdom" ("reino") in the second sense given by the Diccionario de la lengua española de la Real Academia Española: the Crown of Castile consisted of several such kingdoms. Seville was one of the Four Kingdoms of Andalusia. Its extent is detailed in Respuestas Generales del Catastro de Ensenada (1750–54), which was part of the documentation of a census. Falling largely within the present day autonomous community of Andalucia, it included roughly the territory of the present-day provinces of Huelva, Seville, and Cádiz, the Antequera Depression in the present-day province of Málaga, and also some municipalities in the present-day autonomous communities of Extremadura in the province of Badajoz.

Like the other kingdoms within Spain, the Kingdom of Seville was abolished by the 1833 territorial division of Spain.

== See also ==
- Seville
- Localities of the Kingdom of Seville, a list of the localities that composed the Kingdom of Jaén, according to the Catastro of Ensenada (1750–54); this page is an appendix to the Spanish-language Wikipedia.
