= Charles Lindsay Longest =

Charles Lindsay Longest (1933 – May 28, 2024) was suffragan bishop of the Episcopal Diocese of Maryland from October 1989 until October 1997. Longest was born in Catonsville, Maryland. He attended the University of Maryland (BA 1956) and Berkeley Divinity School at Yale (1959).

He was consecrated on October 14, 1989, and retired on the same date in 1997, the eighth anniversary of his consecration as a bishop. Longest's successor as suffragan was John Leslie Rabb.
