= Kingdom of Jaén =

Realm of the Crown of Castile from 1246 to 1833

Coat of arms of the Kingdom of Jaén

The Kingdom of Jaén (Spanish: reino de Jaén) was a territorial jurisdiction of the Crown of Castile since 1246 and until Javier de Burgos' provincial division of Spain in 1833. This was a "kingdom" ("reino") in the second sense given by the Diccionario de la lengua española de la Real Academia Española: the Crown of Castile consisted of several such kingdoms. Known also as the "Santo Reino" ("Holy Kingdom"), its territory coincided roughly with the present-day province of Jaén. Jaén was one of the Four Kingdoms of Andalusia. Its extent is detailed in Respuestas Generales del Catastro de Ensenada (1750–54), which was part of the documentation of a census.

Like the other kingdoms within Spain, the Kingdom of Jaén was abolished by the 1833 territorial division of Spain.

Map of the Kingdom of Jaén, based on the Respuestas Generales del Catastro de Ensenada
(1750–54)

The Four Kingdoms of Andalusia

== See also ==
- Jaén, Spain
- Localidades del Reino de Jaén, a list of the localities that composed the Kingdom of Jaén, according to the Catastro of Ensenada (1750–54); this page is an appendix to the Spanish-language Wikipedia.
