= Edward Weidenfeld =

American lawyer (1943–2022)

Edward L. Weidenfeld, (July 15, 1943 – December 29, 2022) was an American lawyer. He was co-founder and co-manager, Phyto Management, LLC, a licensed medical cannabis cultivator and Co-Founder and Co-Manager of Maryland Cultivation and Processing, Washington, DC. He was also the former counsel to the United States House Committee on Insular Affairs from 1971–1973 and counsel to the 1980 Reagan-Bush campaign. As the founder of the Weidenfeld Law Firm, P.C. in Washington, D.C., he was an attorney specializing in estate and asset protection law. He also served as co-chair of the Board of Visitors of the National Defense University, was a board member and chairman of the Executive Committee of the Center for the Study of the Presidency, and sat on the Advisory Board of the Bureau of National Affairs. Weidenfeld was named one of the Top 75 lawyers in Washington by Washingtonian (magazine) in 2002.

== Participation in government ==
Weidenfeld was Counsel and Staff Director of the Committee on Interior and Insular Affairs from 1971–1973. Three Presidents appointed Weidenfeld to advisory positions, including the President’s Commission on White House Fellows in 1977 and the Council on Administrative Conference of the United States in 1981, 1985 and 1988. He was named a senior fellow to the Council on Administrative Conference in 1991.

In 1982, Weidenfeld was appointed Chairman of the Advisory Panel for Foreign Disaster Relief by then Administrator of the Agency for International Development, Peter McPherson.

== Participation in democratic initiatives ==
In 1983, Weidenfeld was appointed co-counsel to the Democracy Project, whose charge was structuring the National Endowment for Democracy. Among other international projects in his law practice during this time, Mr. Weidenfeld negotiated the first free exchange between the U.S. media and Novisti, the Soviet News Agency. He also represented the Government of South Africa following Nelson Mandela’s election in 1984.

== Notable private sector cases ==
In 1973 Weidenfeld represented the Domestic Ammonia Industry before the United States International Trade Commission to ask for a curb on ammonia imports from the Soviet Union, which the industry argued was exporting ammonia to the United States at below-cost prices. The United States International Trade Commission agreed, and recommended that then-President Jimmy Carter impose a three-year quota that would halve previously forecast imports of ammonia from the Soviet Union.

Weidenfeld also served as counsel to and sat on the board of Imatron Inc. and InVision Technologies during the 1980s and 1990s. Imatron is a medical equipment manufacturer and was bought by General Electric in 2001. In 1990 InVision Technologies was spun out of Imatron and developed the first bomb-detection-machine using the same technology that is used for CAT Scans. InVision remains one of only two companies licensed by the Federal Aviation Administration to sell automatic bomb-detection scanners for airports.

In 1999, Weidenfeld helped facilitate the return of Major League Baseball to Cuba for the first time in 40 years, participating in months of discussions with the United States Department of State, the Cuban Government, the MLB Commissioner’s office, the Baltimore Orioles and the MLB Players Association.

== Relationship with Department of Housing and Urban Development ==
In the late 1980s Weidenfeld invested in a Brunswick, Georgia multi-family apartment development. Upon completion of the final audit of the project, investors agreed with HUD auditors to reduce federal subsidies for the project in the amount of $757,700.

== Education ==
Weidenfeld received his law degree from Columbia Law School and his bachelor of science with honors from the University of Wisconsin, where he was named Outstanding Senior Man in 1965. Weidenfeld has been elected a life member of the American Law Institute.

== Personal life and death ==
Weidenfeld married Sheila Rabb in 1968.

Weidenfeld was the paternal nephew of actor Jesse White.

Weidenfeld died on December 29, 2022, at the age of 79.
