= Journal of Interdisciplinary History =

Academic journal

- Discipline: History
- Language: English
- Edited by: Robert I. Rotberg; Theodore K. Rabb

Publication details
- History: 1969–present
- Publisher: MIT Press (United States)
- Frequency: Quarterly
- Impact factor: 0.727 (2014)

Standard abbreviations
- ISO 4: J. Interdiscip. Hist.

Indexing
- ISSN: 0022-1953 (print); 1530-9169 (web)
- JSTOR: 00221953
- OCLC no.: 1799976

Links
- Journal homepage; Online access

The Journal of Interdisciplinary History is a quarterly peer-reviewed academic journal published by the MIT Press. It covers a broad range of historical themes and periods, linking history to other academic fields.

== Contents ==
The journal features articles, review essays and book reviews, linking history with other fields of academic research, such as economics and demographics. Unlike most other historical journals, the content is not limited to one geographical area or historical period, and covers social, demographic, political, economic, cultural and technological history.

Each issue has 200 pages.

== Editors ==
Since its inception, the Journal of Interdisciplinary History has been edited by Robert Rotberg and Theodore Rabb.

According to the Journal Citation Reports, the journal has a 2014 impact factor of 0.727, ranking it 6th out of 87 journals in the category "History". According to the SCImago Journal Rank it has a h-index of 27.
