= Jeremy Rabb =

American stage and screen actor (born 1970)

- Born: January 28, 1970 (age 55); Princeton, New Jersey
- Education: Princeton University (BA), Harvard University
- Father: Theodore K. Rabb

Jeremy Rabb (born January 28, 1970) is an American stage and screen actor.

== Early life and education ==
Rabb was born in Princeton, New Jersey. His father, Theodore K. Rabb, was a historian and professor at Princeton University. Jeremy graduated from the Institute for Advanced Theater Training at Harvard University.

== Career ==
Between 2005 and 2007, Rabb had a recurring role as an ER resident on the television series Grey's Anatomy. He performed in the William Shakespeare comedy Twelfth Night, or What You Will with A Noise Within, a Pasadena-based theatrical company.

== Filmography ==
=== Film ===
Year	Title	Role	Notes
1991	Renaissance: The Dissenter	Jan Hus	
2000	The Opponent	Fight Announcer	
2000	Schrodinger's Cat	Erwin Schrödinger	
2007	Let Others Suffer	Brandon Dietz	
2013	Her	Devotee #1	Uncredited
2016	Fell, Jumped or Pushed	Brandon	
2021	Los Angeles	Artie Purcell	

=== Television ===
Year	Title	Role	Notes
2003	Hope & Faith	Another Dad	Episode: "Anger Management"
2005–2007	Grey's Anatomy	ER Resident	10 episodes
2011	Southland	Attorney	Episode: "The Winds"
2011	Off the Map	Dave Packard	Episode: "There's a Lot to Miss About the Jungle"
2011	Weeds	Priest	Episode: "Do Her/Don't Do Her"
2012	Sports Tips with Chip	Larry	Episode: "Larry Talks Chip's Fan Club"
2013	Jewbellish: The Show	Ed Cohen	Episode: "Mad Mentsch: Cohen's Lipstick"
2014	Silicon Valley	HumanHeater CEO	Episode: "Proof of Concept"
2015	It's Always Sunny in Philadelphia	Ugly Guy	Episode: "The Gang Group Dates"
2015	The Odd Couple	Jim	Episode: "The Birthday Party"
2015	Hot in Cleveland	Manager	Episode: "Family Affair"
2015	Return to Sender	Sam	Episode: "L.A. At Last!"
2019	Goliath	Mr. Schmidt	Episode: "Fer-De-Lance"
2021	Brooklyn Nine-Nine	Perp #3	Episode: "The Last Day"
2023	Night Court	Bennett	Episode #1.1
