= John Leslie Rabb =

John L. Rabb (born 1944) is a former bishop suffragan of the Episcopal Diocese of Maryland. He is a graduate of DePauw University, the University of Iowa, and the former Episcopal Divinity School (1976). He was consecrated on October 10, 1998, and retired on January 1, 2011. Rabb's predecessor as suffragan was Charles Lindsay Longest (1989–97).
