= Robert Lamar Rabb =

American entomologist

Robert Lamar Rabb (6 August 1919 — 31 July 2006) was an American entomologist and a professor at North Carolina State University. He worked mainly on pest management and applied ecology of insects.

Rabb was born in Lenoir where he was introduced to the wilderness by his timberman grandfather and his mother, who was interested in wildflowers. His education was interrupted by the war years during which he served in the 390th Bombardment Squadron of the US Air Force in the Solomon Islands, New Guinea and the Philippines. He went to North Carolina State University graduating in 1947 and working briefly in mills. He however returned to academics, and studied under B.B. Fulton, H.K. Townes, Jr., and Z.P. Metcalf. He studied the life histories of Polistes wasps and obtained a PhD in 1953. He then joined NCSU as an assistant professor, working on pest management, mainly in tobacco. Along with his colleague Frank Guthrie, he organized an international conference on pest management in 1970 that was very influential in shaping the field of Integrated Pest Management. He was a pioneer of quantitative approaches to modelling crop ecosystems. He was made the W.N. Reynolds Professor of Entomology in 1981. He was also the recipient of a Geigy Award and several ESA awards.
