= Sheila Rabb Weidenfeld =

American TV producer, former US Press Secretary

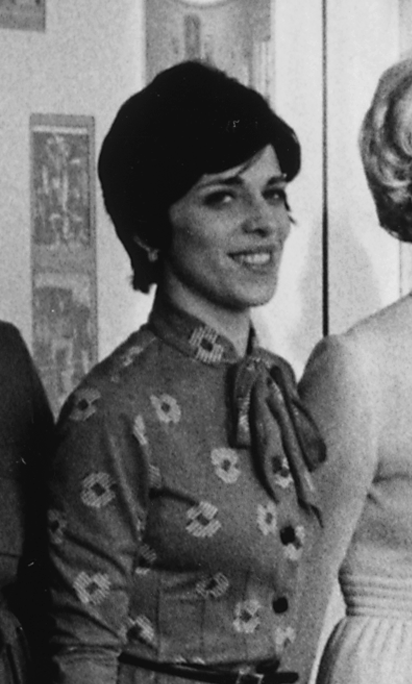
- Sheila Rabb Weidenfeld in 1975
- Born: September 7, 1943

Sheila Rabb Weidenfeld (born September 7, 1943) is a television producer and the former Press Secretary to First Lady Betty Ford and Special Assistant to President Gerald Ford. She is the author of the "First Lady's Lady," a book about her experiences in the Ford White House.

== Professional career ==
Weidenfeld started her career as a Production Assistant at WNEW-TV in New York City and was eventually promoted to Associate Producer. Weidenfeld later worked as a producer for the WTTG Channel 5 television afternoon talk show "Panorama,". She later produced WRC-TV Channel 4's morning talk show "Take it From Here." Weidenfeld was the executive producer and hostess of the television show "Your Personal Decorator" for the Tempo Networks. She has worked on television programming for Metromedia, Fox, and NBC.

Weidenfeld has also served on several advisory boards. She was appointed by President Ronald Reagan in 1987 to be a founding member of the United States Holocaust Memorial Council, and was appointed by Secretary of State Henry Kissinger to the Advisory Committee for the Foreign Service Institute. She served on boards for the Women's Campaign Fund and the Wolftrap Foundation for the Performing Arts. Weidenfeld also served as Chairman of the C&O Canal National Historical Park Commission. Weidenfeld serves as a Director on the Board for the Center for Science in the Public Interest, and is an honorary General Consul for the Republic of San Marino, which knighted her.

Weidenfeld graduated high school from the Hewitt School in New York City in 1961 and Brandeis University with a Bachelor of Arts in 1965.

== Personal life ==
Weidenfeld is married to Edward Weidenfeld, founder of the Weidenfeld Law Firm, P.C., and resides in Washington DC. She has two sons, Nicholas and Daniel. Nicholas is the head of Animation Domination High-Def studios for Fox. Daniel is a show runner and executive producer of "China, IL" along with other programs on "Adult Swim."

Weidenfeld is the daughter of Maxwell Rabb, the former Secretary to the Cabinet for President Dwight D. Eisenhower and Ambassador to Italy.

== Additional Information ==
- The Daily Beast- First Momma in the White House
- [VIDEO] First Ladies in the Media
- The Gerald Ford Library and Museum
