= Four Kingdoms of Andalusia =

18th-century term for territories in Spain

The Four Kingdoms of Andalusia.

The Four Kingdoms of Andalusia (Spanish: cuatro reinos de Andalucía or, in 18th-century orthography, quatro reynos del Andaluzia) was a collective name designating the four kingdoms of the Crown of Castile located in the southern Iberian Peninsula, south of the Sierra Morena. These kingdoms were annexed from other states by the Kingdoms of Castille during the Reconquista: the Kingdom of Córdoba was conquered in 1236, the Kingdom of Jaén in 1246, the Kingdom of Seville in 1248 and the Kingdom of Granada in 1492.

The name was used in some contexts at least since the middle of the 18th century. Some works and documents that use the designation are the Juzgados militares de España y sus Indias (1792), the Prontuario de las leyes y decretos del Rey nuestro Señor Don José Napoleon I (1810), and Breves tratados de esfera y geografía universal (1833), among many others.

== See also ==
- Hermandad General de Andalucía
