= Theodore K. Rabb =

American historian

Theodore Rabb
- Born: 5 March 1937; Teplice-Sanov, Czechoslovakia
- Died: 7 January 2019 (aged 81); Plainsboro Township, New Jersey, U.S.
- Education: Queen's College, Oxford (BA, MA); Princeton University (MA, PhD)
- Occupation: Historian
- Known for: 16th- and 17th-century European history
- Title: Professor of History at Princeton University
- Spouse: Tamar Janowsky
- Children: 3, including Jeremy Rabb

Theodore K. Rabb (March 5, 1937 – January 7, 2019) was an American historian specializing in the early modern period of European history. He was a professor of history at Princeton University. He was one of the leading scholars in the field of 16th- and 17th-century Europe, focusing on varying topics such as climate history and food history.

== Education ==
Rabb was born in Teplice-Sanov, Czechoslovakia, to Oskar and Rose (Oliner) Rabinowicz. His father was an author and professor, and in 1939 the family emigrated, settling in London. He studied at The Queen's College, Oxford (B.A., 1958; M.A., 1962) and at Princeton University (M.A., 1960; Ph.D., 1961). His Ph.D. advisers were Elmore Harris Harbison and Frank Craven. Rabb was a professor of history at Stanford University, Northwestern University, and Harvard University before becoming an associate professor at Princeton University in 1967.

== Career ==
He was a member of the Princeton faculty since 1967, teaching in both the History Department and in Humanistic Studies, an interdisciplinary program. He also directed Princeton's Community College programs.

In 1970, the same year he received a Guggenheim Fellowship, he co-founded the Journal of Interdisciplinary History with Robert I. Rotberg. He was also an advisor for the 1993 television series Renaissance. He was a member of the board of editors of the journals Computers and the Humanities, Computer Studies in the Humanities and Verbal Behavior, and Climatic Change.

He also served on the boards of the Hebrew University of Jerusalem and Save Venice, and he chaired the National Council for History Education and the New Jersey Council for the Humanities.

== Bibliography ==
=== Books ===
- Enterprise and Empire: Merchant and Gentry Investment in the Expansion of England, 1575-1630 (Cambridge, MA: Harvard University Press, 1967)
- The Struggle for Stability in Early Modern Europe (Oxford: Oxford University Press, 1975)
- Renaissance Lives: Portraits of an Age (New York: Pantheon Books, 1993)
- Jacobean Gentleman: Sir Edwin Sandys, 1561-1629 (Princeton: Princeton University Press, 1998)
- Emergence of International Business 1200-1800, Volume III: Enterprise and Empire (New York: Taylor & Francis, 1999)
- The Last Days of the Renaissance & the March to Modernity (New York: Basic Books, 2006)
- Why Does Michelangelo Matter?: A Historian's Questions about the Visual Arts (Palo Alto, California: The Society for the Promotion of Science and Scholarship, 2018). A collection of reviews of art history books and art exhibitions.

==== As editor ====
- The Thirty Years' War: Problems of Motive, Extent, and Effect (2nd ed. Lexington, Mass.: D.C. Heath, 1972); (1st ed. Boston, Mass.: D.C. Heath, 1964)

===== With Robert I. Rotberg =====
- The Family in History: Interdisciplinary Essays (New York: Harper & Row, 1973)
- Marriage and Fertility: Studies in Interdisciplinary History (Princeton: Princeton University Press, 1980)
- Climate and History: Studies in Interdisciplinary History (Princeton: Princeton University Press, 1981)
- Industrialization and Urbanization: Studies in Interdisciplinary History (Princeton: Princeton University Press, 1981)
- The New History, the 1980s and Beyond: Studies in Interdisciplinary History (Princeton: Princeton University Press, 1982)
- Hunger and History: The Impact of Changing Food Production and Consumption Patterns on Society (Cambridge: Cambridge University Press, 1985)
- Population and Economy: Population and History from the Traditional to the Modern World (Cambridge: Cambridge University Press, 1986)
- Art and History: Images and Their Meaning (Cambridge: Cambridge University Press, 1988)
- The Origin and Prevention of Major Wars (Cambridge: Cambridge University Press, 1989)

===== with Ezra Suleiman =====
- The Making and Unmaking of Democracy: Lessons from History and World Politics (New York: Routledge, 2002)

=== Journal articles ===
==== In the Journal of Interdisciplinary History ====
- 'The Historian and the Climatologist', 10 (1980): 831–837
- 'Coherence, Synthesis, and Quality in History', 12 (1981): 315–332
- 'The Development of Quantification in Historical Research', 13 (1983): 591–601
- 'The Interdisciplinary Nature of American History', 16 (1985): 103–106
- 'The Evidence of Art: Images and Meaning in History', 17 (1986): 1–6
- 'History and Religion: Interpretation and Illumination', 23 (1993): 445–451
- 'The Historian and Art: A New Maturity', 33 (2002): 87–93
- 'How Italian Was the Renaissance?', 33 (2003): 569–575
- 'Opera, Musicology, and History', 36 (2006): 321–330

===== Review articles =====
- 'The Historian and the Art Historian', 4 (1973): 107–117
- 'The Historian and the Art Historian Revisited', 14 (1984): 647–655
- 'The Historian and the Art Historian, III: Recent Work on the Seventeenth Century', 20 (1990): 437–444
- 'Historians and Art Historians: A Lowering of Sights?', 27 (1996): 87–94

==== In Past & Present ====
- 'Religion and the Rise of Modern Science', 31 (1965): 111–126
- 'Science, Religion and Society in the Sixteenth and Seventeenth Centuries', 33 (1966): 148
- 'Free Trade and the Gentry in the Parliament of 1604', 40 (1968): 165–173
- 'The Advent of Printing and the Problem of the Renaissance: A Comment', 52 (1971): 135–140
- 'The Role of the Commons', 92 (1981): 55–78

==== Other journals ====
- 'The Effects of the Thirty Years' War on the German Economy', The Journal of Modern History, 34 (1962): 40–51
- 'The Editions of Sir Edwin Sandys's "Relation of the State of Religion"', The Huntington Library Quarterly, 26 (1963): 323–336
- 'Sir Edwin Sandys and the Parliament of 1604', The American Historical Review, 69 (1964): 646–670
- 'Investment in English Overseas Enterprise, 1575-1630', The Economic History Review, 19 (1966): 70–81
- 'On Nominalism and Idealism, Historical and Statistical: A Response to Roger Schofield', The Historical Journal, 15 (1972): 788–793
- 'The Expansion of Europe and the Spirit of Capitalism', The Historical Journal, 17 (1974): 675–689
- 'Court Festivals of the European Renaissance: Art, Politics and Performance', English Historical Review, 118 (2003): 1384–1385
- 'Observations - Why Michelangelo Matters: His Spiritual World has Vanished, But the Master's Quest for Perfection is Rightly Irresistible', Commentary, 122 (2006): 56
- 'Those Who Do Not Learn History...', Chronicle of Higher Education, 53 (2007)

===== Review articles =====
- 'Parliament and Society in Early Stuart England: The Legacy of Wallace Notestein', The American Historical Review, 77 (1972): 705–714
- 'Early Modern Europe from Above and Below', The Journal of Modern History, 45 (1973): 456–462

== See also ==
- Princeton University Department of History
- Princeton University
