= Catastro of Ensenada =

1749 census within the Crown of Castile

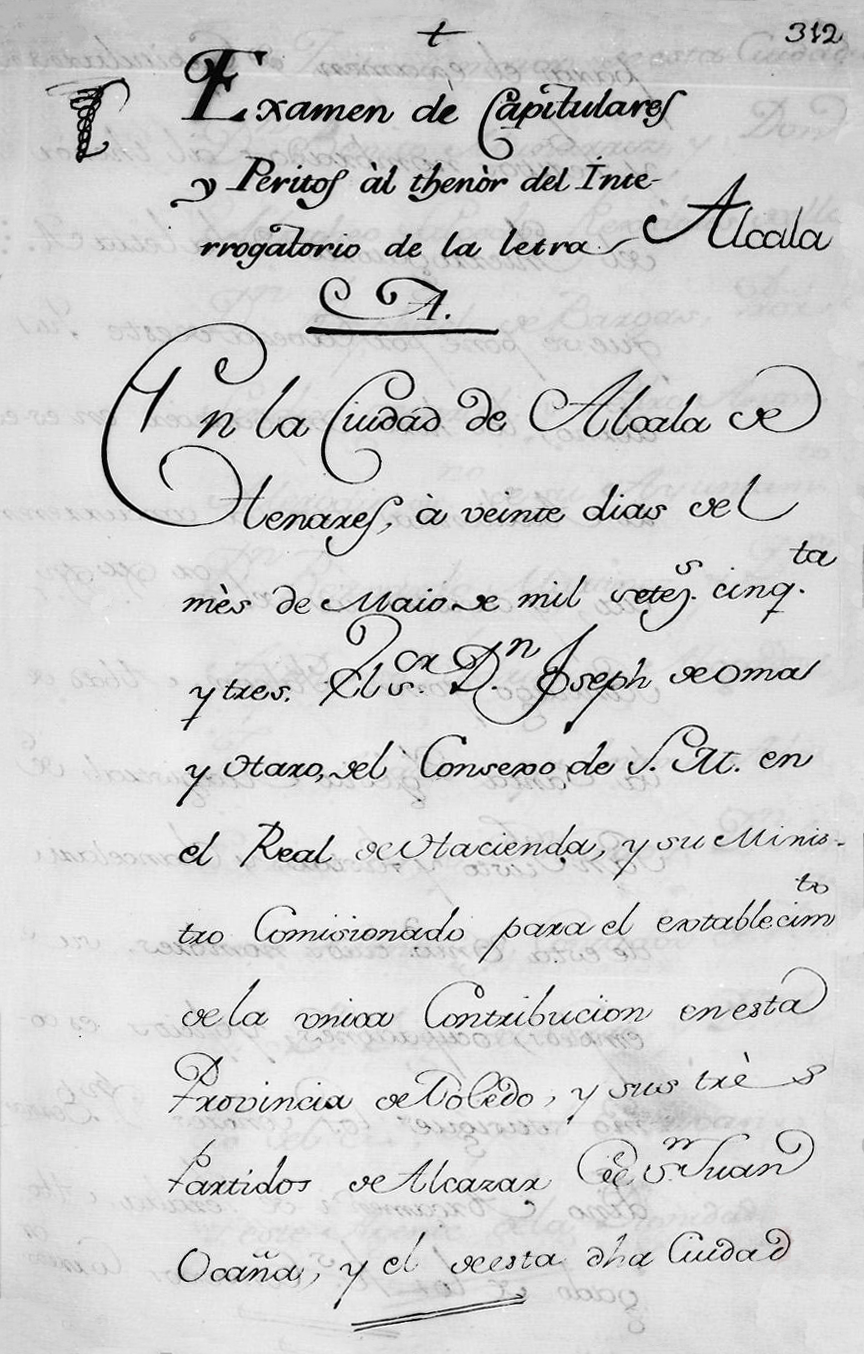

In 1749 a large-scale census and statistical investigation was conducted in the Crown of Castile (15.000 castilian places; excluded the Basque provinces, Navarre and the Crown of Aragon). It included population, territorial properties, buildings, cattle, offices, all kinds of revenue and trades, and even geographical informations from each place. It was encouraged by king Ferdinand VI of Spain and his minister the Marquis of Ensenada, and is known today as the Catastro of Ensenada.

The general answers of each place to the 40 questions of the Catastro produced a huge volume of documentation that affords historians an opportunity to analyze the economy, the society, the practices of the señorío system (manorialism) and environmental data from 18th-century Spain. It is the best statistical register of the pre-statistical age of the Ancien Régime in Europe.

Today the word catastro means cadaster, “register of the properties”, but the etymology comes from “enquire”. In the 18th century there was a distinction between a catastro, which was made by central officers who traveled to the places to enquire, and the amillaramiento, which was made by local authorities.

== The single tax ==
The Catastro originated in a proposal for a single tax (única contribución), studied by 16 members of the Council of Castile, the Hacienda (Treasury), the Indies (America), the Military Orders, five intendentes (first provincial authorities) and the head of the Barcelona Court. After receiving the negative opinion of Councils and the positive opinion of the intendentes, the king saw fit to begin the survey in the interest of the Crown and the vassals (October 10, 1749). With the royal order came a comprehensive set of instructions, or handbook, for the correct implementation of the Catastro by the enquirers and the public.

Measures were taken to prevent fraud, with public readings of the findings at each locality. Officers from other provinces were called when the local officers were not trustworthy. Test inquiries were also held in one locality within each province, to detect errors of implementation.

The number of officers in the Contadurías de Rentas Provinciales (i.e., the central treasury bureaucracy) rose from no more than three to more than a hundred, now under the orders of the Real Junta de Única Contribución (royal commission for a single tax). The reform of the Rentas Provinciales (a complex and heterogeneous mixture of revenues including all sorts of taxes, such as the alcabalas, tithes, millones, cientos, tercias reales, etc.) was the objective of the new system. A single tax, proportional to the income of each person, was to be determined from the results of the Catastro.

The single tax proposal was inspired by a very modern economic doctrine (nearer the Physiocratic school than mercantilism), which viewed the old tax system as anti-economic and injurious to the nation because it was only paid by the productive part of the population: the common people. The nobility and the clergy, exempt from other taxes by their privileged condition, were also able to avoid the "sales taxes" because they raised their own crops, out of the regular markets where this tax (the alcabala) was paid. The existing tax system made free trade nearly impossible.

The Catastro did not lead to a substantial Treasury reform. Such a far-reaching reform was made impossible by the resistance of the privileged. The French revolted against a similar tax system, while Spain made that change silently (the only disturbances were the easily calmed Esquilache Riots of 1766, and those were only tenuously connected with other reformist episodes), because the two countries were in unequal states of transition from feudalism to capitalism.

Other documents were completed simultaneously, like the so-called Census of Ensenada, which produced an accurate estimation of 9.400.000 inhabitants for the peninsular territory of Spain in 1756.

The quality of the answers varied from province to province and from town to town. Given its accuracy, the data from the province of Jaén (which covered more territory than it does today) were copied and sent as an example for the other provinces.

The Respuestas Generales (general responses) are held in several archives of the Spanish state, and the General Archive of Simancas keeps copies of all the answers. Most of the documents were microfilmed in the 1980s and are now available on the Internet.

== Bibliography ==
- John Lynch (1989). Bourbon Spain, 1700-1808. B. Blackwell. p. 168. ISBN 978-0-631-14576-9.
