= Diccionario de la lengua española =

Dictionary of the Spanish language by the Royal Spanish Academy, first published in 1780

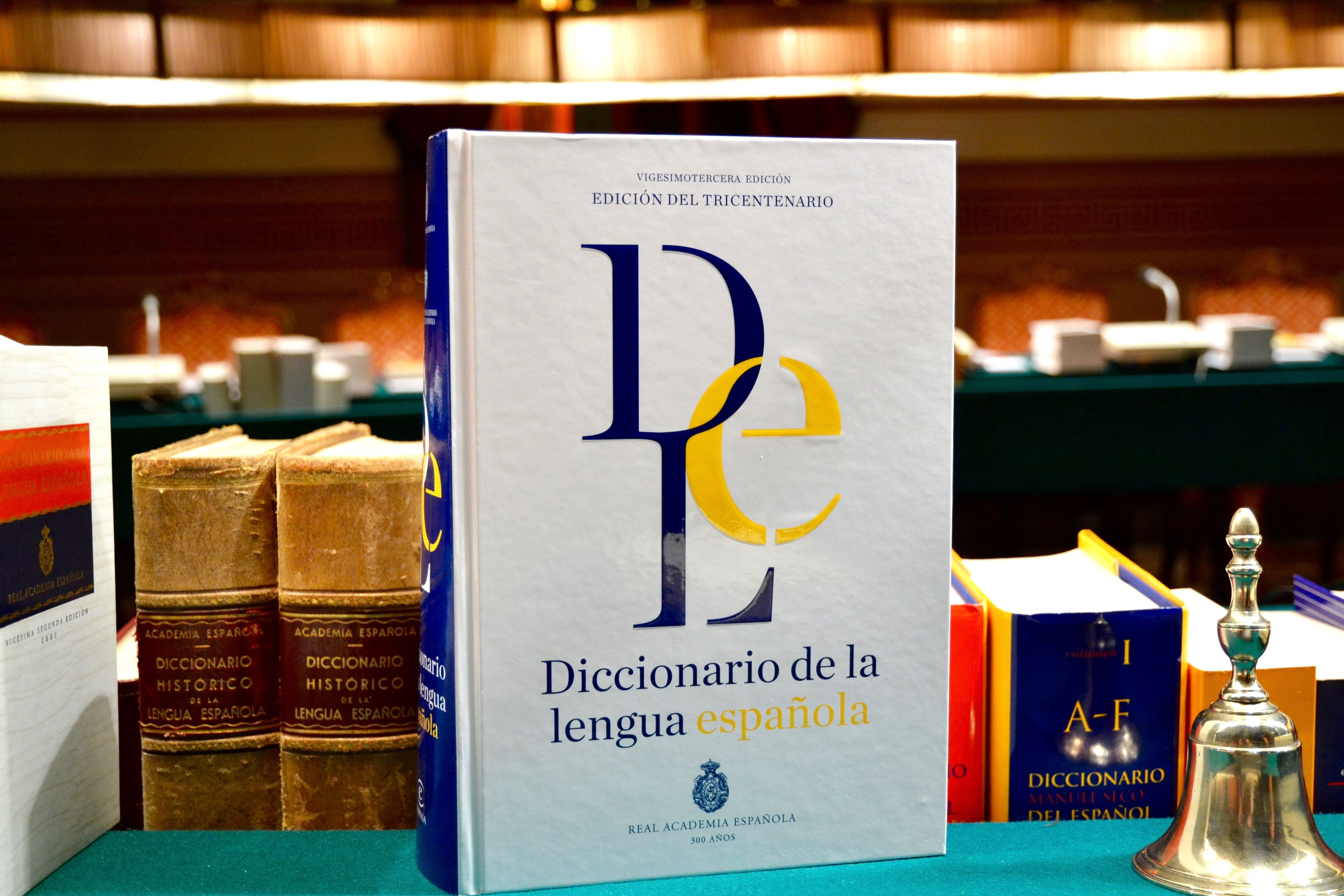
- The Twenty-Third Edition of 2014
- Language: Spanish
- Subject: Spanish language
- Publisher: Royal Spanish Academy
- Publication date: 1st edition: 1780; 2nd edition: 1783; 3rd edition: 1791; 4th edition: 1803; 5th edition: 1817; 6th edition: 1822; 7th edition: 1832; 8th edition: 1837; 9th edition: 1843; 10th edition: 1852; 11th edition: 1869; 12th edition: 1884; 13th edition: 1899; 14th edition: 1914; 15th edition: 1925; 16th edition: 1936/1939; 17th edition: 1947; 18th edition: 1956; 19th edition: 1970; 20th edition: 1984; 21st edition: 1992; 22nd edition: 2001; 23rd edition: 2014; 24th edition: 2026
- Publication place: Spain
- Website: https://dle.rae.es

The Diccionario de la lengua española (Note: Spanish pronunciation: [diɣθjoˈnaɾjo ðe la ˈleŋɡwa espaˈɲola]) (DLE; (Note: Although often referred to as the DRAE (Diccionario de la Real Academia Española), this is not the official title of the publication."Diccionario de la lengua española, claves de redacción". Fundéu (in Spanish). 15 October 2014.) English: Dictionary of the Spanish Language) is the authoritative dictionary of the Spanish language. It is produced, edited, and published by the Royal Spanish Academy, with the participation of the Association of Academies of the Spanish Language. It was first published in 1780, as the Diccionario de la lengua castellana and subsequent editions have been published about once a decade. The twenty-fourth edition was released on October 30, 2026, marking the first time that the printed version was based on the online version, while the previous version was published in 2014.

The dictionary was created to maintain the linguistic purity of the Spanish language; unlike many English-language dictionaries, it is intended to be authoritative and prescriptive, rather than descriptive.

== Origin and development ==
=== Purpose ===
When the Royal Spanish Academy was founded in 1713, one of its primary objectives was to compile an authoritative Spanish dictionary. Its first statutes said in 1715 that its purpose was to:

cultivate and stabilise the purity and elegance of the Castilian language, removing all the errors in words, modes of speech, and syntax that have been introduced by ignorance, vain affectation, carelessness, and the excessive freedom to innovate. It will be used to distinguish foreign words, phrases and constructions from our own, the outdated from the current, the low and rustic from the courtly and elevated, burlesque from seriousness, and, finally, the accurate from the inaccurate.

The Academy's original motto of limpia, fija y da esplendor (It cleans, stabilises, and gives splendour [to the language]) was in more recent times modified to unifica, limpia y fija (it unifies, cleans, and stabilises). In 1995 it was still expected to "establish and spread the criteria of propriety and correctness".

=== Editions ===
The first dictionary was the six-volume Diccionario de Autoridades ("Dictionary of Authorities"), published from 1726 to 1739. Based on that work, an abridged version was published in 1780, the full title of which was Diccionario de la lengua castellana compuesto por la Real Academia Española, reducido á un tomo para su más fácil uso ("Dictionary of the Castilian tongue composed by the Royal Spanish Academy, reduced to one volume for its easier use"). According to its prologue, the dictionary was published for general public access during the long time between the publishing of the first and second editions of the exhaustive Diccionario de Autoridades, thus offering a cheaper reference book. By the time the second edition was published, it had become the principal dictionary, superseding its ancestor.

The fourth edition of the dictionary (1803) introduced the digraphs "ch" (che) and "ll" (elle) to the Spanish alphabet as separate, discrete letters. Entries starting with "ch" were placed after all the "c" entries (so czarda appeared before chacal), and "ll" entries after "l". Also in 1803, the letter "x" was replaced with "j" when it had the same pronunciation as "j", and the circumflex accent was eliminated. In 1994, it was decided at the 10th Congress of the Association of Academies of the Spanish Language to use the universal Latin alphabet, which does not include "ch" and "ll" as single letters.

The earliest editions were more extensive: they included Latin translations of the entry, in some cases gave usage examples (especially in popular phrases), and summarised the word's etymology; contemporary editions do so concisely. The earliest editions had "x" entries that no longer appear individually.

Historically, the decision to add, modify, or delete words from the dictionary has been made by the Academy in consultation with other language authorities (especially in Latin America) when there was an uncertainty. This process continued between 1780 and 1992, but, since the 1992 edition, Academy committees, the Instituto de Lexicografía, and the Association of Academies of the Spanish Language—which specifically deals with American vocabulary—collaborate in producing the Dictionary of the Spanish Language.

==== List of editions ====
The editions are listed on the Academy's website, and the forewords of former editions can be accessed from there. Some editions, including the 1726–1739 Diccionario de autoridades, are available in facsimile, or for online search.

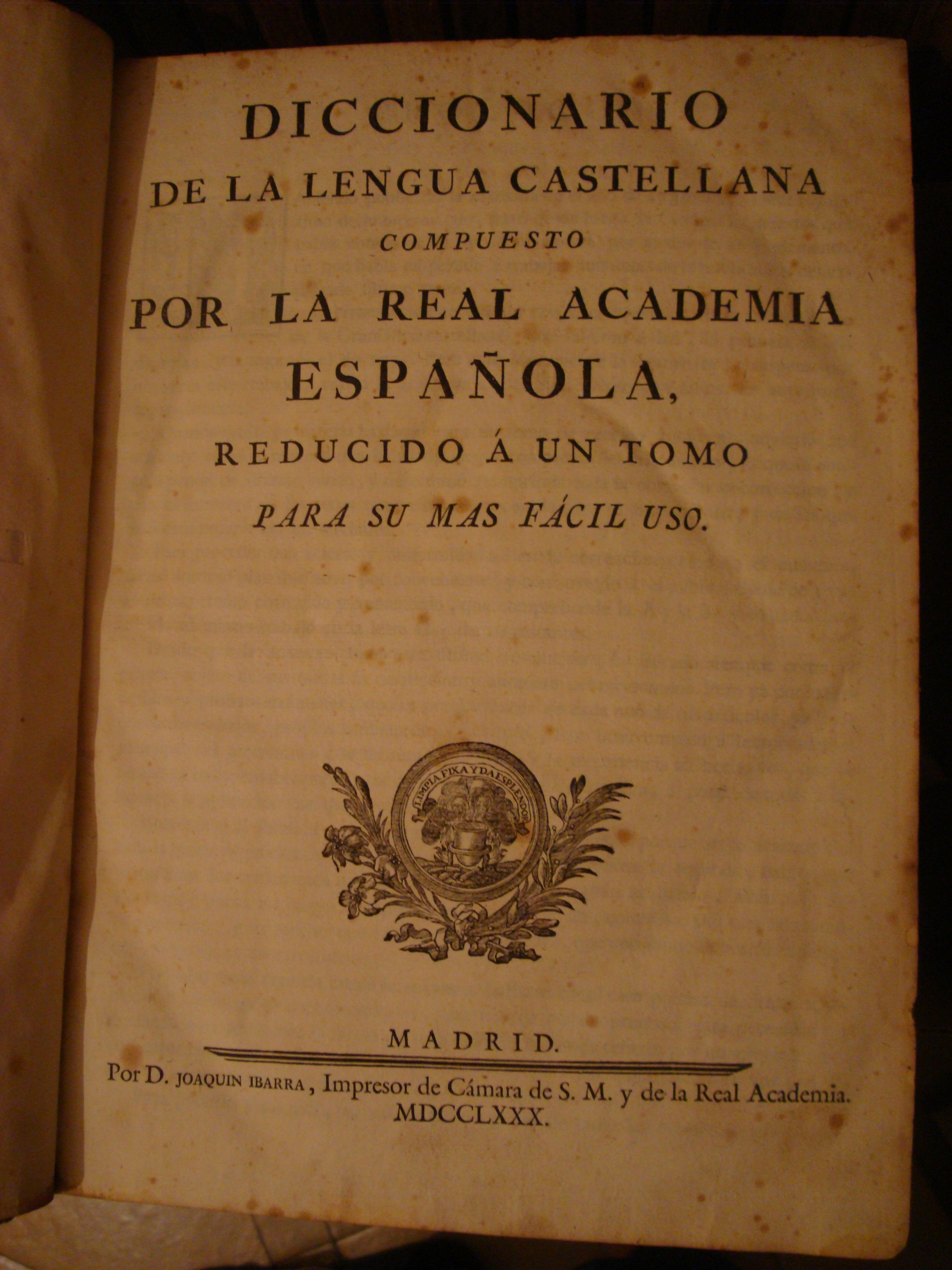
Title page of the 1780 edition

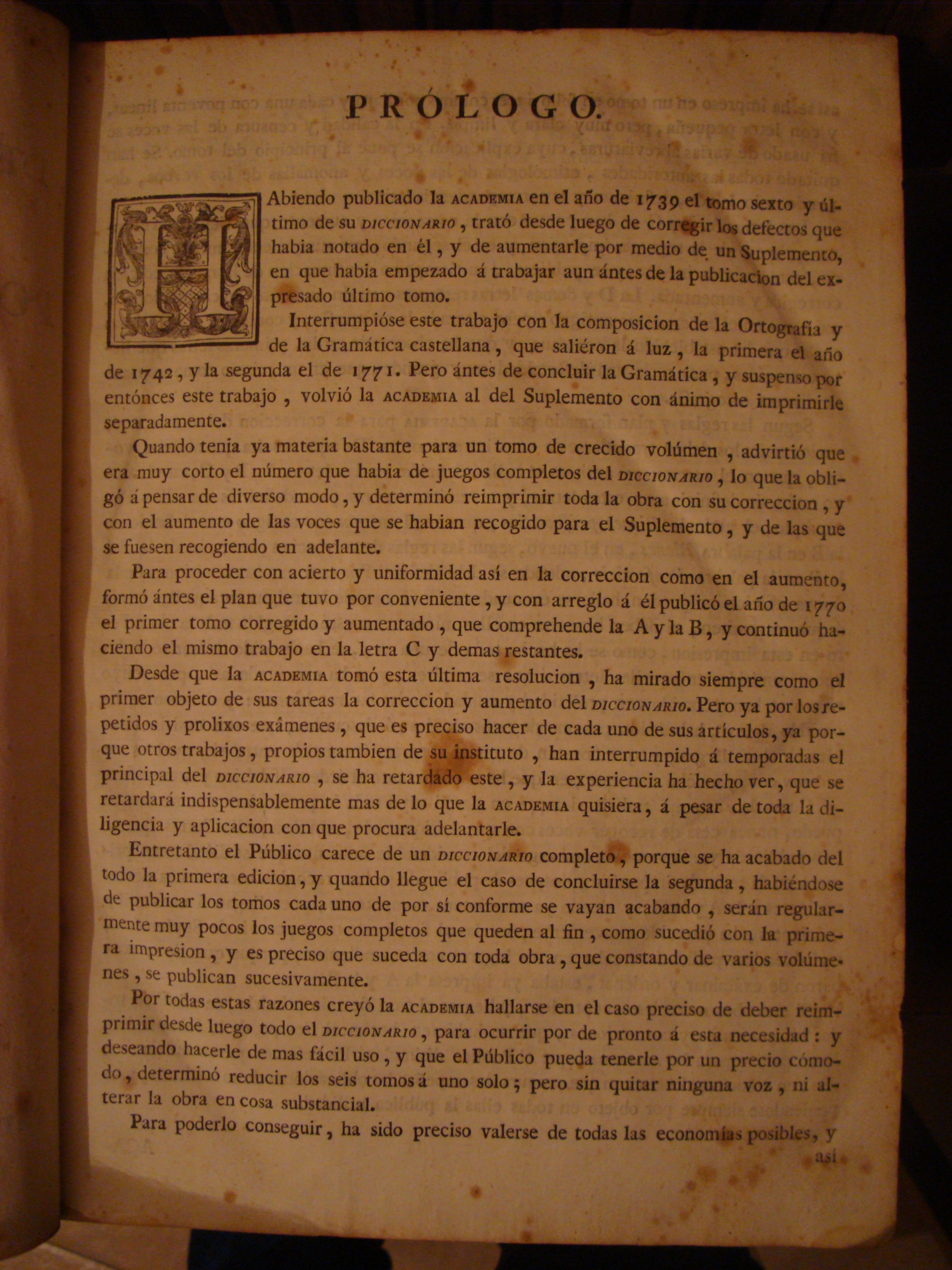
First page of the Prologue to the 1780 edition

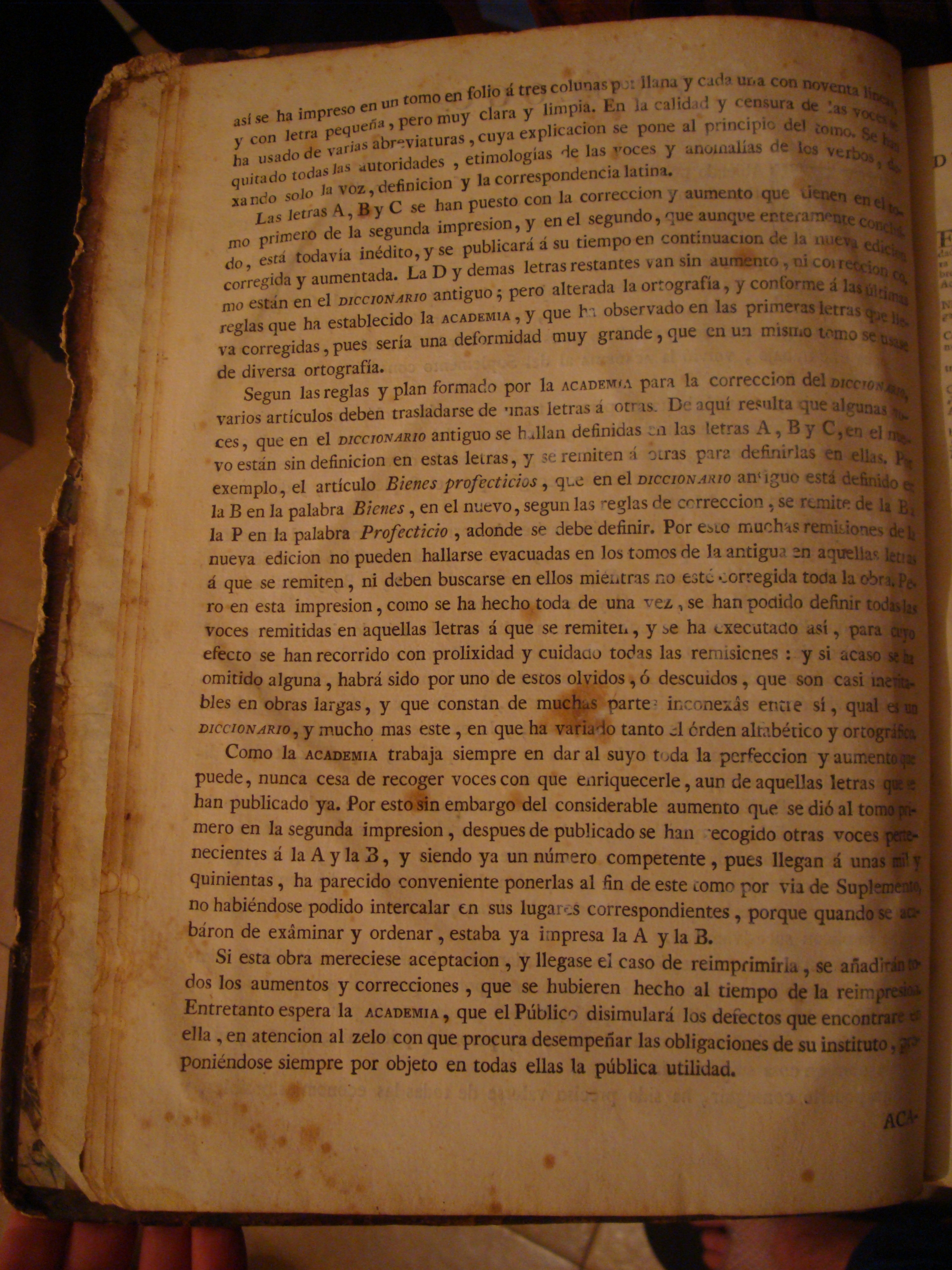
Second page of the Prologue to the 1780 edition

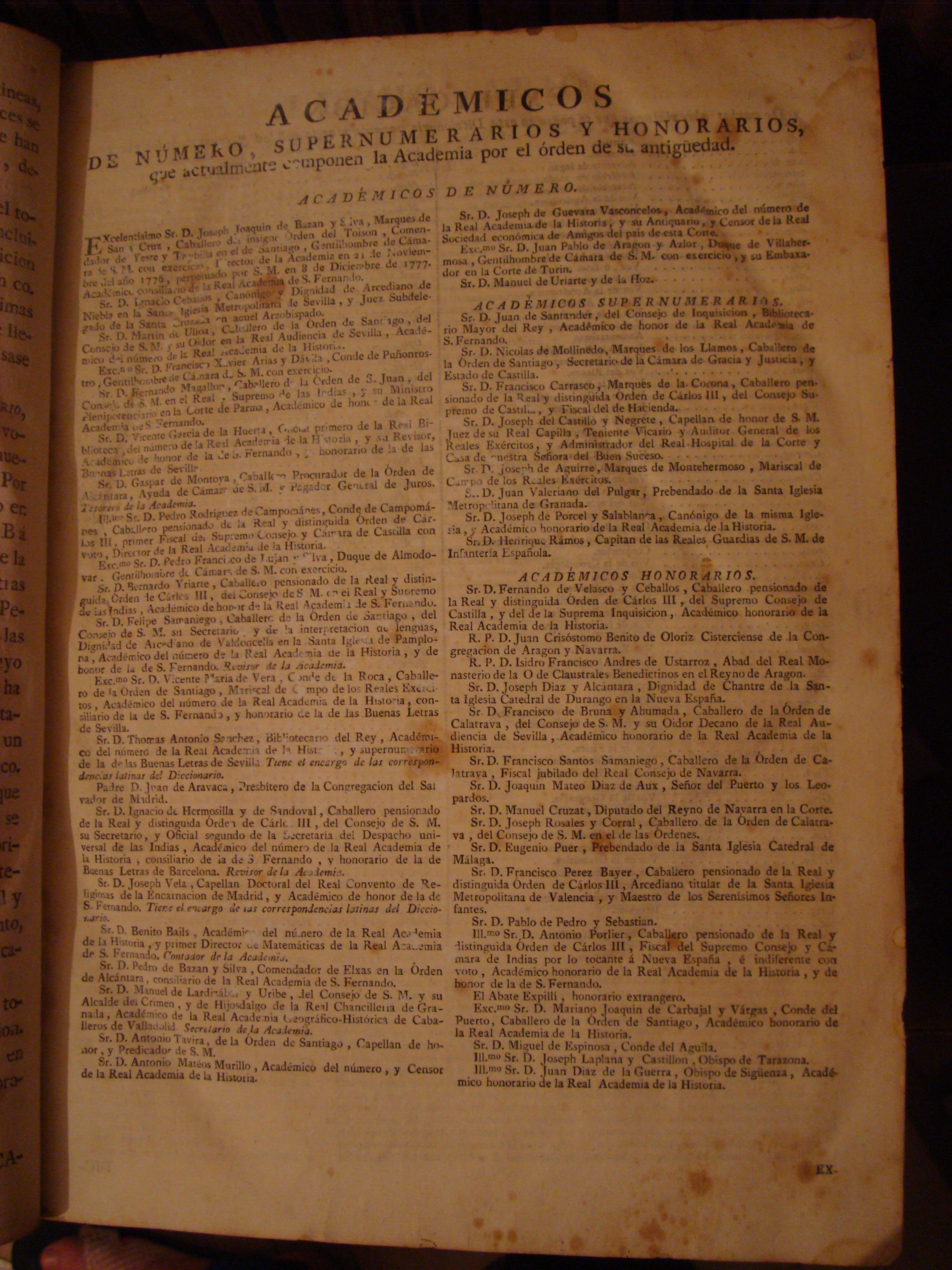
List of academics, as printed in the 1780 edition

== Formats ==
Until the twenty-first edition, the dictionary was published exclusively on paper. The twenty-second edition (2001) was published on paper, CD-ROM, and on the Internet with free access. The twenty-third edition (2014) was also made available online with free access. The twenty-fourth edition (2026) was the first natively digital edition.

Sample entries, with explanation of annotations and abbreviations, are available from the Academy's website.

== Previous titles ==
From the first edition (1780) through the fourth edition (1803), the dictionary was known as the Diccionario de la lengua castellana compuesto por la Real Academia Española ("Dictionary of the Castilian language composed by the Spanish Royal Academy"). From the fifth edition (1817) through the fourteenth edition (1914), it was known as the Diccionario de la lengua castellana por la Real Academia Española ("Dictionary of the Castilian language by the Spanish Royal Academy"). Starting with the fifteenth edition (1925), it has been known as the Diccionario de la lengua española ("Dictionary of the Spanish language"), to recognise the many regions of the Spanish-speaking world.

== Criticism ==
=== Pejorative definitions ===
Many Spanish dictionaries have had racial and religious bias over the centuries; the DLE is no exception. Christianity and Catholicism were described in favourable terms; Judaism, Islam, and Protestantism unfavourably. By 2021 few biased definitions remained in the updated online DLE.

In 2006, the Spanish Federation of Jewish Communities complained that some of the dictionary's entries and definitions about Judaism were racist and offensive.

In 2014, various Romani groups complained about the dictionary's entry for the word gitano ("Gypsy"), which noted that the word could be used to mean "swindler" or "trickster". The Academy refused to remove this definition, arguing that the dictionary "does not invent words or meanings but reflects the use that speakers make of each word". A disclaimer describing this usage as "offensive and discriminatory" was eventually added to the entry.

The dictionary also defined "woman" as the "weak sex". In November 2017, the term was examined and one month later it was changed.
