= Nuevas Poblaciones de Sierra Morena y Andalucía =

Historical Spanish subdivision

- Intendancy of Spain
- 1784–1835
- Coat of arms

- Intendancy of Nuevas Poblaciones in 1800
- Capital: La Carolina
- History
  - Established: 1784
  - Disestablished: 1835
Preceded by
Kingdom of Jaén
Kingdom of Córdoba
Kingdom of Seville
Kingdom of Toledo (Crown of Castile)
Succeeded by
Province of Jaén (Spain)
Province of Córdoba (Spain)
Province of Seville
- Today part of: Spain

Nuevas Poblaciones de Sierra Morena y Andalucía (in English: New Settlements of Sierra Morena y Andalucía) was a Spanish intendancy created in 1784, during the reign of Charles III of Spain, under a charter of its own issued in 1767. This charter was later repealed on three occasions: between 1810 and 1811 under Joseph Bonaparte, by the Cortes of Cádiz (between 1813 (Note: Decree CCXLIII (in Spanish), of 24 March 1813. The intendancy is abolished; measures for the formation of its town councils and designation of its territory, pastures, etc.) and 1814) and during the Liberal Triennium (1820–1823). The definitive abolition took place on 5 March 1835 by royal decree. This intendancy was the "fifth Andalusian province", with the same political and administrative level as the Four Kingdoms of Andalusia: Córdoba, Jaén, Seville and Granada.

Charles III entrusted the creation and management of the Nuevas Poblaciones to Pablo de Olavide, as superintendent, in 1767. He founded towns in Sierra Morena, between Córdoba and Écija and between Écija and Carmona. The objective was to improve the safety of the traffic of people and goods traveling along that part of the road from Madrid to Andalusia, which was a wild area where bandits took refuge. To this end, agriculture and livestock farming were promoted in those places with Central European Catholic settlers, mainly Germans, Flemings and Swiss. The first settlers were brought by the Bavarian adventurer Johann Kaspar Thürriegel.

An attempt was made to create a new social organization free from the inherited flaws of the past which, according to the Enlightened reformers, hindered rural life. To this end, Olavide and Campomanes drafted the Charter of the Nuevas Poblaciones, which regulated the economic and social aspects of the settlers' lives.

The new human settlements did not receive the name of city, town or place, but were known as parishes and hamlets and all together as "Nuevas Poblaciones". The superintendent's seat was established in La Carolina in 1767, remaining from 1784 as the seat of the intendancy, and a subdelegation was established in La Carlota in 1768.

== Settlements ==
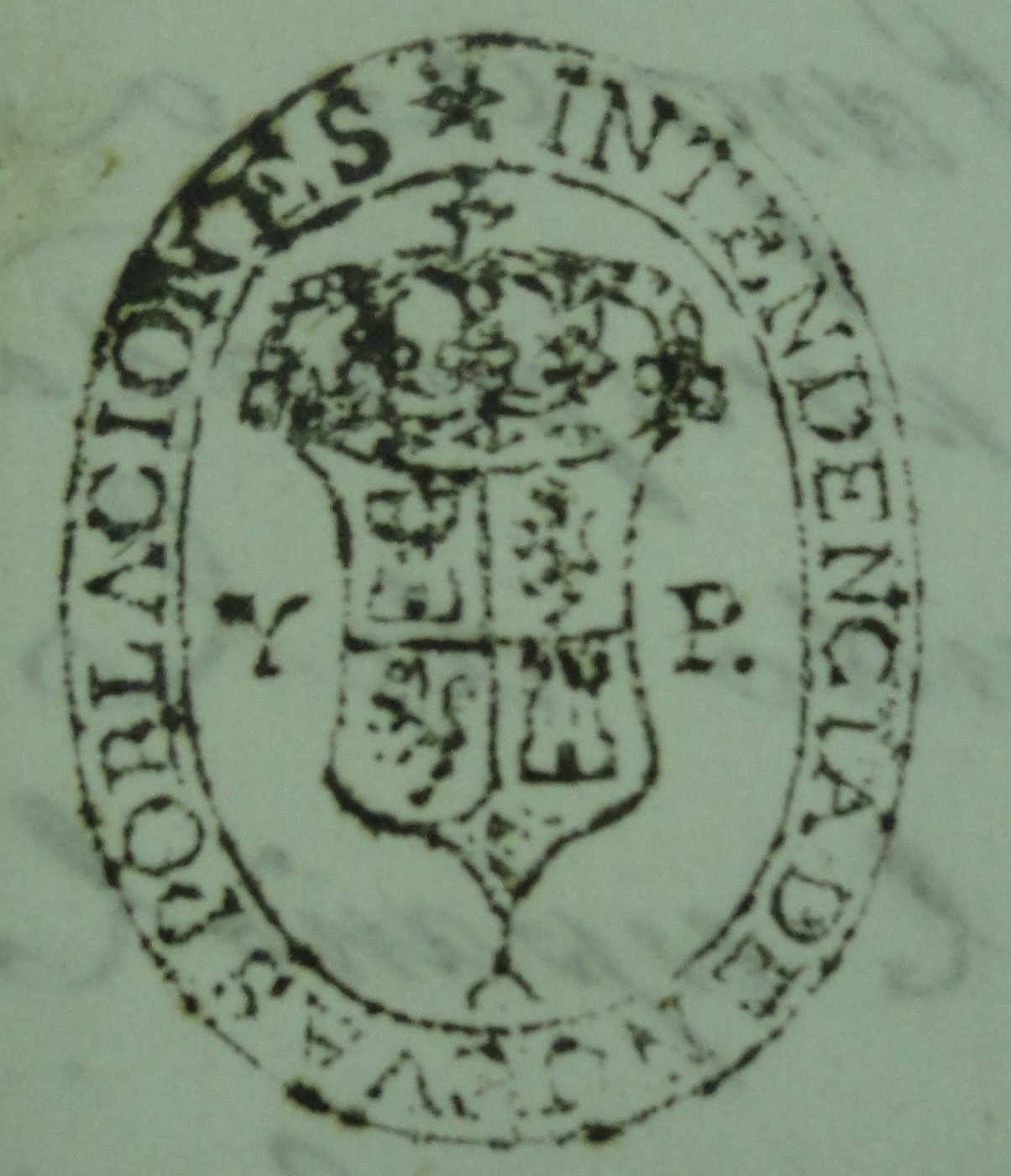
Seal with the coat of arms of the Intendancy of Nuevas Poblaciones

In Sierra Morena the following new settlements were created: Aldeaquemada, Arquillos, Carboneros, La Carolina —seat of the superintendent and later of the intendancy—, Guarromán, Miranda del Rey, Magaña, Montizón, Navas de Tolosa, El Rumblar, and Santa Elena.

The parish of La Carolina had three villages: Camino de Granada (Isabela), Venta del Catalán (Fernandina) and Vista Alegre. That of Carboneros had four: El Acebuchar, Los Cuellos, La Mesa de Carboneros and Escolástica. Guarromán had four: Arellano, Martín Malo, Los Ríos and El Altico. Arquillos had one: El Porrosillo. Montizón had two: Aldeahermosa and Venta de los Santos. Aldeaquemada had three: Buenos Aires, Santa Cruz and Tamujosa. Santa Elena had: El Portazgo, Venta Nueva and Las Correderas (the houses of Las Correderas, El Collado de los Jardines and Mojón Blanco). Miranda, with one: Magaña. Navas de Tolosa with: Fuente del Rey or del Rey (Eight Houses) and Camino de Vilches (Six Houses).

In Lower Andalusia the following new settlements were created: La Carlota —seat of a subdelegation—, La Luisiana, Fuente Palmera and San Sebastián de los Ballesteros.

The parish of La Carlota had five villages: La Fuencubierta, El Garabato, Las Pinedas, Pequeña Carlota and Vaneguillas. Fuente Palmera housed the villages of Cañada, Villar, Ventilla, Peñalosa, Herrería, Villalón, Aldea del Río (current hamlet Ochavillo del Río), Silillos and Fuente Carreteros (independent municipality since 2018). La Luisiana, for its part, had three villages: Cañada Rosal (independent municipality since 1986), El Campillo and Motillos.

In 1781 the settlement of Concepción de Almuradiel was founded in La Mancha, with inhabitants from the neighboring localities of Viso del Marqués and Santa Cruz de Mudela. In 1793 the village was administratively incorporated into the Nuevas Poblaciones de Sierra Morena, which at that time was directed as intendant by Miguel de Ondeano. From then on, it was subject to the Charter of Nuevas Poblaciones of 1767.

In addition, following the same founding pattern, in 1768 the settlements of Armajal and Prado del Rey were created, with inhabitants from the Grazalema mountains and the Ronda mountains, which would give rise to the Cádiz municipality of Prado del Rey. This new settlement was never governed by the Charter of the Nuevas Poblaciones.

== Background ==
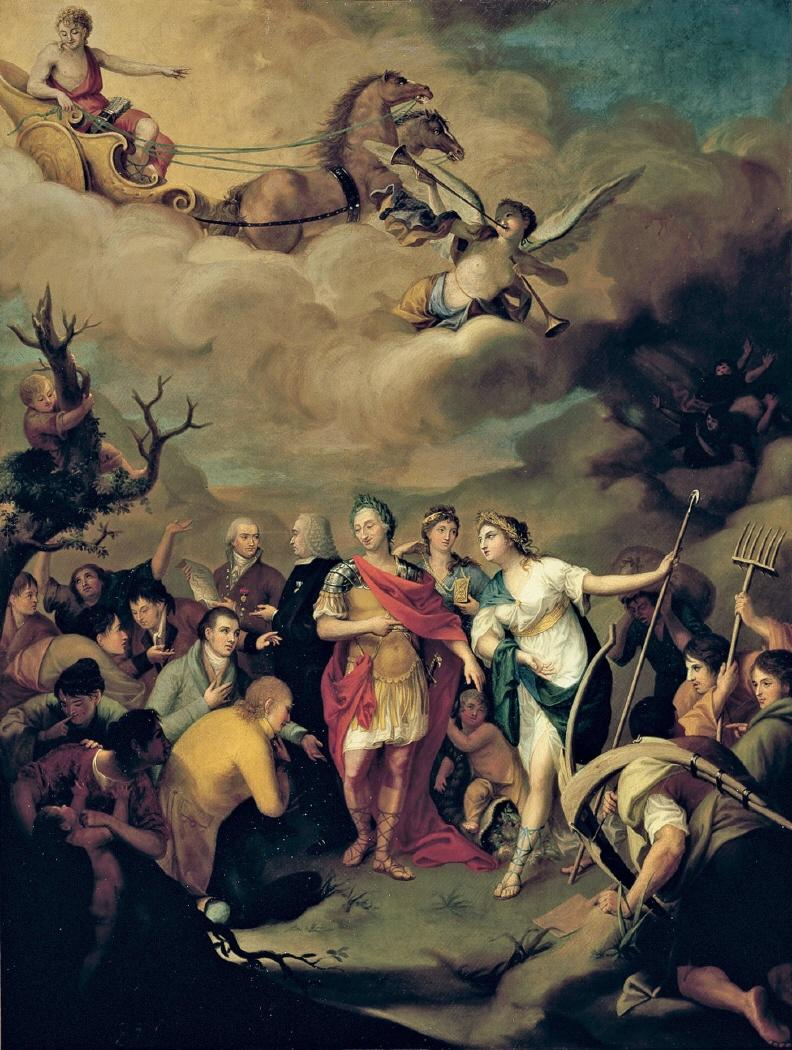
"Charles III handing over the lands to the settlers of Sierra Morena", by José Alonso del Rivero. 1805. Oil on canvas. 168 × 126 cm. Royal Academy of Fine Arts of San Fernando. Madrid. (Note: José Alonso del Rivero, Charles III handing over the lands to the settlers of Sierra Morena (1805).)

The territories of the Holy Roman Empire were in a difficult situation after the last two wars. The colonizations carried out by Frederick II in the Prussian heaths had achieved great resonance. Similarly, Catherine the Great, between 1764 and 1765, had invited Germans to populate the vast empty lands of Russia.

In May 1766 Johann Kaspar Thürriegel, a Bavarian adventurer, proposed to King Charles III the recruitment in Germany and Flanders of some 6,000 settlers who could be used to develop the lands of Puerto Rico and South America. Before responding, the government wanted to consult the measure with Pablo de Olavide, considered competent and a good connoisseur of Spanish America.

Olavide replied that the prosperity of America depended on population, but that the increase should be treated differently depending on whether it concerned already exploited regions with an organized society or completely empty regions. In the already populated areas there was a society made up of whites of Spanish origin, Indians and black slaves. The Indians were employed in the mines and the blacks in the fields. For Olavide, if Germans were sent to these countries, they would "become contaminated" with racial prejudices and would soon move away from working the land, so no colony of workers would be created. On the other hand, it was urgent to populate the vast empty regions of southern South America, both to secure the stops for ships rounding Cape Horn and to prevent the English from settling there. However, for Olavide, populating them exclusively with foreigners presented drawbacks. For him, it would be better to colonize those territories with a part foreigners and a larger part Spaniards, so that the Spanish language would prevail, so that the religious ministry would be carried out by Spanish priests and, finally, to create laws and regulations with the purpose of Hispanicizing the foreigners. Olavide proposed that the Spaniards in charge of populating the empty areas of South America should come from the orphanages of Madrid and San Fernando de Henares.

Olavide's unfavorable opinion and that of a commission created for this purpose were transmitted to the Council of Castile, which proposed as the best solution to employ those six thousand settlers in populating "Sierra Morena or other depopulated areas".

It would be a matter of populating the deserted region between Valdepeñas, south of La Mancha, and Bailén, in the northern part of Andalusia. In this way, that enormous extension of mountains, previously exploited and abandoned from the 13th century onwards, would be recovered for agriculture, and the new general road planned in 1761 that would communicate Madrid with Andalusia would be secured. At that time, there was only a road, barely passable for carts, with some inns that were accomplices and coverers of bandits, who were found in those places and robbed and sometimes killed travelers. The Holy Brotherhood was not enough to pursue these criminals. The idea, from the times of Ferdinand VI, was to replace the forest and scrub with crops and establish in the terrain a sedentary population with interest in public safety, for which the population offered by the Bavarian adventurer was useful.

A new agreement with Thürriegel was therefore necessary. On 26 February 1767, the Council of Castile proposed to the sovereign a new draft agreement. This was ratified on 3 March before the chief notary of the council. Thürriegel undertook to recruit six thousand settlers, all Catholics, in Germany and Flanders, and to ensure their transport to Spanish ports. They would live according to Spanish laws but would be provided with clergy who spoke their language. Thürriegel would receive 326 reales for each person who disembarked in Spain and would be invested with the title of colonel. In addition, the Bavarian would be allowed to deliver at will eight titles of captain or lieutenant. These conditions were published in a royal decree of 2 April 1767.

The Council of Castile, presided over by the Count of Aranda, entrusted Pablo de Olavide with the task of directing the colonization. For Pedro Rodríguez de Campomanes, fiscal of the council, to direct the colonies "it is necessary for someone to know how to understand and deal with men and make himself loved and respected by the multitude, of which Don Pablo de Olavide has given proof, in the rapid establishment of the Royal Hospice of San Fernando".

On 22 June 1767 the Madrid Gazette announced the appointment of Pablo de Olavide as superintendent of Nuevas Poblaciones, assistant of Seville and intendant of the Army in Andalusia.

== Charter of the Nuevas Poblaciones of 1767 ==
Olavide and Campomanes drafted the Charter of the Nuevas Poblaciones. This was an enlightened sociological experiment. It was an attempt to create, with entirely new elements, an ideal society free from the inherited flaws of the past which, according to the reformers, hindered rural life.

On 5 July 1767 a Royal Decree for the Nuevas Poblaciones was promulgated, incorporating an instruction given on 25 June 1767. The instruction has 79 precepts.

The superintendent was responsible for choosing the site of the new foundations:

Article 5. The first care of the superintendent of said settlements must be to choose the sites in which they are to be established, and in which they are healthy, well ventilated, without stagnant waters that cause intemperance; having a plan drawn up so that, in this way, in all the doubts that arise, he has before him the material position of the lands, and can take charge of it.

Each family would be entitled to a house, a workable plot of 50 fanegas, about 33 hectares. Upon arrival they would receive the necessary tools to till, a plow and a pick, and livestock with two cows, a donkey, five sheep, as many goats, five hens, a rooster and a pregnant sow. They would also be provided with the necessary means of subsistence until the first harvests. Once they had cultivated the fifty fanegas, they would receive another fifty, free of all taxes and censuses for the first ten years.

Each holder had to fence his land with a hedge with fruit trees. The livestock of the Mesta would have no access to the colonized territory and their privileges would have no force there. There would be a close association between livestock and tillage, since each farmer would also be a livestock breeder. The house would be established on the plot of land granted, remaining scattered throughout the countryside. In addition, the establishment of population centers that were about a quarter of a league apart from each other was planned, as well as that the main centers would be located along the royal road of Andalusia.

The administrative unit would be the parish, whose jurisdiction would extend to four or five settlements and to the scattered farms located within its perimeter. They would have a deputy of the common in each village. Each parish would have a mayor and a syndic personero. All these positions had to be elected and could never be perpetual.

To choose their local representatives, the Nuevas Poblaciones were guided by the Auto Accordado issued by the Royal Council on 5 May 1766.

In each suitable place a church would be built, attended by a clergyman who spoke the language of the faithful, a building for the town hall and a jail. The municipal revenues would come from the product of the mills and common ovens and, eventually, from the portions of land cultivated in common by all the inhabitants.

Arbitrios, all privileges and monopolies that might hinder trade would be prohibited.

The foundation of any convent or religious community was prohibited.

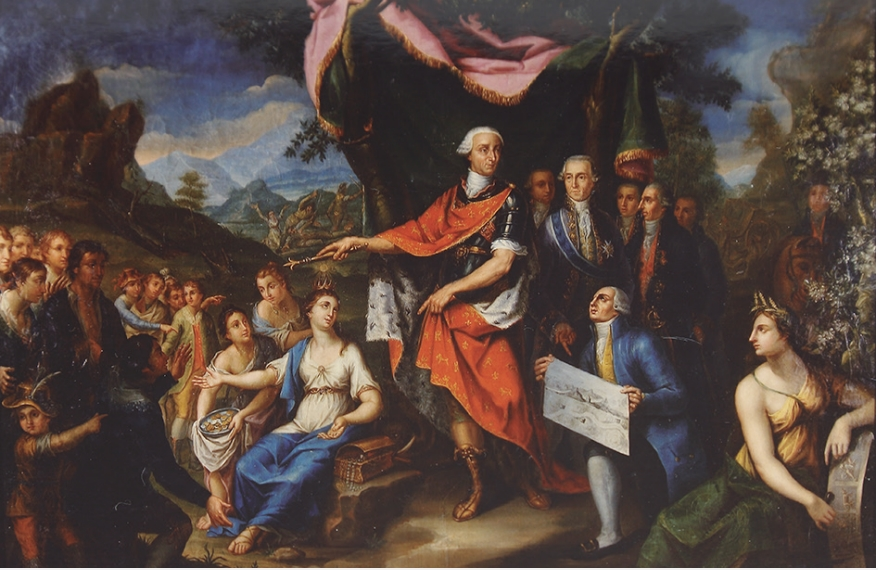
"Allegory of the colonization of Sierra Morena by Pablo de Olavide in the reign of Charles III", by Felipe Abás Aranda. 1805. Collection of the Sanz Fuertes family. Zaragoza.

Each town council had to build a school and elementary education would be compulsory for all children. However, to avoid the abandonment of agriculture, the foundation of grammar schools and university study centers was prohibited.

Article 75. There shall be no studies of Grammar in all these new settlements, and much less of other higher Faculties, in observance of what is provided in the law of the Kingdom, which rightly prohibits them in places of this nature, whose inhabitants must be destined to tillage, breeding of livestock, and mechanical arts, as the nerve of the strength of a State...

Spaniards could settle, but only on the condition that they were natives of distant provinces, such as Murcia, Valencia, Catalonia, Aragon, Basque Provinces, Asturias and Galicia, that is, regions with an agrarian regime different from the common one in Andalusia and other neighboring lands. In addition, marriages between Germans and inhabitants of neighboring provinces were prohibited.

In 1784 the superintendency was transformed into another intendancy. To the 22 intendancies created in 1749 would be added the Intendancy of the Nuevas Poblaciones de Sierra Morena and Andalusia. The Estate of Procurators of the Kingdom asked the queen regent for the suspension of the intendancy on 26 December 1834. Following a favorable report from the Royal Council and the Council of Ministers, the Royal Decree of 5 March 1835 declared:

the charter of population ordered to be observed by Royal Decree of 5 July 1767 is abolished and consequently the Intendancy of the Nuevas Poblaciones de Sierra Morena, the Superintendency of Almuradiel, the Subdelegation of La Carlota, as well as all other offices and courts established therein and subsequent provisions for the administration and special regime of said colonies are suppressed.

== Foreign population ==
Thürriegel left for Germany in June 1767. To recruit settlers, he began distributing leaflets in German and French mentioning the rights their inhabitants would have under the charter and describing the Spanish lands in an idyllic way. He established in France a system of stops and stages where his commissioners welcomed travelers to lead them to Spain by land or sea. Most of the settlers embarked in Sète for the Andalusian ports on ships of the shipowners Despetis and Thibal. These two had entered into a contract with Thürriegel to have the exclusive transport under very advantageous conditions.

Joseph Yauch / José Antonio Yauch, a general of the Canton of Uri of Switzerland, offered the Spanish representatives to recruit one hundred families of peasants. His proposal was accepted, reaching an agreement with the Spanish government similar to that of Thürriegel.

In Ajaccio (Corsica), several hundred Greeks had been ruined by the war between Corsicans and Genoese, and wished to leave the island. Campomanes made a report in favor of welcoming them in Spain and the Council of Castile decided to admit the Greek families. In 1768 France annexed Corsica and the new governor of the island, Count de Marbeuf, prevented the Greeks from embarking for Spain arguing that Corsica needed its workers.

In Saint-Jean-d'Angély there were about two thousand French who had arrived there to later colonize Guiana, but that colonization had been frustrated. A part of them, joined by some artisans, arrived in Spain in 1768.

When Thürriegel distributed his French leaflets in France, the Secretary of State of that country, Étienne François de Choiseul, prohibited the departure of his citizens to Spain and put obstacles in the way of the departure of settlers coming from Germany and Switzerland. The Court of Vienna also opposed the departure of its citizens.

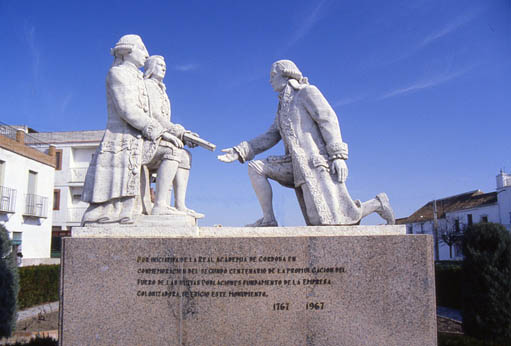
Olavide, kneeling, receives from Charles III, in the presence of Campomanes, the royal order for colonization. La Carlota. (Note: The work is a commemorative monument of the second centenary (1967) erected in La Carlota. See another pictorial work from the early 19th century: * Victorino López, Foundation of the Colonies in Sierra Morena by Charles III.)

In order for the imperial government to consent to the departure of certain settlers, the Spanish ambassador argued that he wanted to purge the country of vagrant and harmful foreigners. On the other hand, Thürriegel, eager to collect for each person, also recruited disabled people and Protestants. And, although at the Andalusian ports and the Pyrenees, commissioners appointed by Olavide controlled who entered and rejected those considered useless for colonization, the shipowners bribed some of them to let everyone in. Other commissioners were stricter, but Campomanes, who wanted to start the project as soon as possible, curbed their zeal in the hope that the environment in the new lands would make them useful citizens for the State.

Olavide expected peasants to arrive, but from September 1767 a heterogeneous crowd began to arrive.

Olavide asked the general of the Capuchins, Aimé de Laballe, to send friars who knew German and some who knew French to the colonies.

Today, foreign surnames are preserved in the settlements that were founded. Some examples can be mentioned: in La Luisiana one can find Hans, Pigner, Ancio, Uber, Delis, Rúger, Vidriel, Hebles, Columbrí, Fítler, Demans, Bacter and Lagrán; in Cañada Rosal there are Fílter, Rúger, Hans, Hebles, Duvisón, Delis, Chambra, Bacter, Balmont, Pigner, Uber, Ancio and Pistón; and in San Sebastián de los Ballesteros foreign surnames are present in 50.94% of the population.

In the 1830s it is recorded that there were people who knew German in the area of La Luisiana. In La Carolina it is recorded that there were people who knew how to speak German in the 1840s. In 2020 words of German and French origin have been documented in the settlements founded with foreign settlers in the 18th century.

Central European traditions are preserved in some of the colonies: painted eggs at Easter in Arquillos, Cañada Rosal, Carboneros, Guarromán, La Luisiana and Santa Elena (where the eggs are boiled before being painted and thrown down a slope, called rulahuevos); and the Bear Dance in Fuente Carreteros.

== History ==
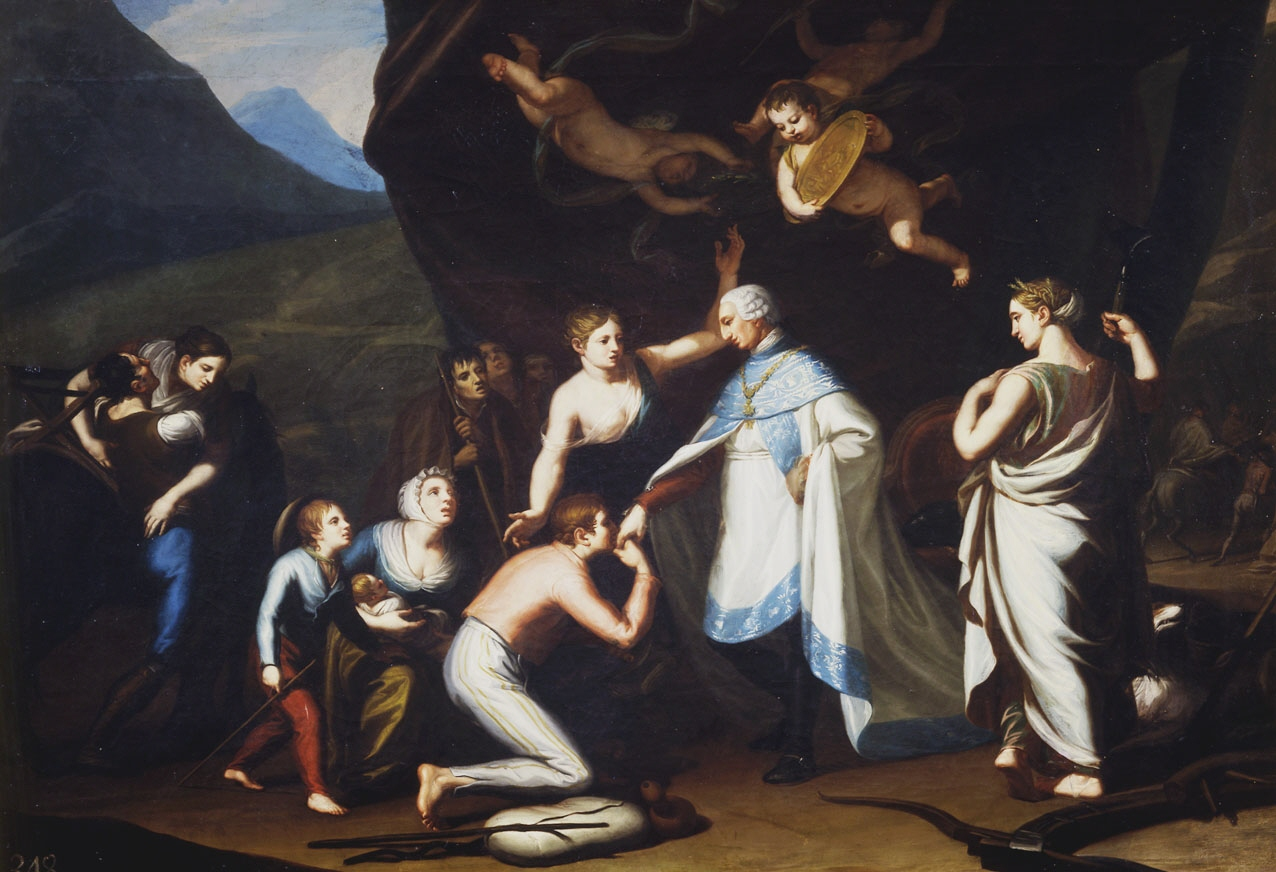
"Charles III in the habit of the order of his name receiving the settlers of Sierra Morena", by José de Odriozola y Oñativia. 1805. Oil on canvas. 100 × 140 cm. Real Academia de Bellas Artes de San Fernando. Madrid.

A week after the publication of the 1767 charter, Campomanes sent instructions to the commissioners in charge of the inventory of the Jesuits' goods (expelled from Spain that same year) in the provinces of La Mancha, Extremadura and Andalusia, ordering them to place at Olavide's disposal cattle, grain, furniture and agricultural utensils belonging to Jesuit establishments, first proceeding to their inventory.

Olavide could choose his collaborators and would answer only to the Council of Castile. In addition, he would deal with the Minister of Finance on all financial matters.

Olavide appointed as subdelegate a friend, the enlightened Miguel de Gijón y León. The extension of the colonies in 1768 led Olavide to appoint a second subdelegate. He tried to count on Luis de Urbina, husband of his cousin Gracia de Olavide and colonel of a regiment in Cádiz, for this position, but the Minister of War opposed it so as not to deprive himself of an officer of such merit. He then chose Fernando de Quintanilla. Olavide appointed Miguel de Ondeano as treasurer, who, after Olavide's fall from grace in 1775, succeeded him in the position of superintendent of Nuevas Poblaciones. This was transformed into intendant in 1784 and held that position until his death on 20 December 1794. In 1795 Tomás González Carvajal was appointed new intendant.

Because of his sympathies with France, Olavide chose Frenchmen to deal with certain matters with the settlers, although those of Gallic origin were in the minority. The French were in the "technical general staff" as engineers or agricultural experts. Olavide appointed his private secretary, Bernard d'Arquée (Spanishized as Darquea), as general secretary of the superintendency. As director of the clergy Olavide appointed the French priest Jean Duval Lanes, who had collaborated with him in the Hospice of San Fernando de Henares.

Olavide arrived in Sierra Morena for the first time on 20 August 1767 to make the first topographical delineations of the region to be cleared and to arrange what was necessary for the foundation of the first three settlements: La Peñuela, Santa Elena and Guarromán.

In 1573 a monastery of Discalced Carmelites had been founded in an area known as La Peñuela. For the foundation of the first of the Nuevas Poblaciones, the monastery was expropriated and used as one of the first infrastructures of the locality. Olavide decided to establish in La Peñuela the seat of the superintendency and the chief accountancy. He ordered the construction, next to the church that had belonged to the Carmelites, of the so-called Intendant's Palace, which is still preserved. The first settlers arrived in September 1767 but there were no houses to house them, which caused the first discontent. The families were able to settle in the monastery and in tents erected by the Swiss Regiments stationed in La Peñuela. The works of the new settlement progressed rapidly and, in 1768 two commemorative columns with stone reliefs alluding to the works carried out were built. On 22 November 1770 Olavide informed Minister Múzquiz that he had given the order to change the name of La Peñuela to La Carolina, in honor of Charles III.

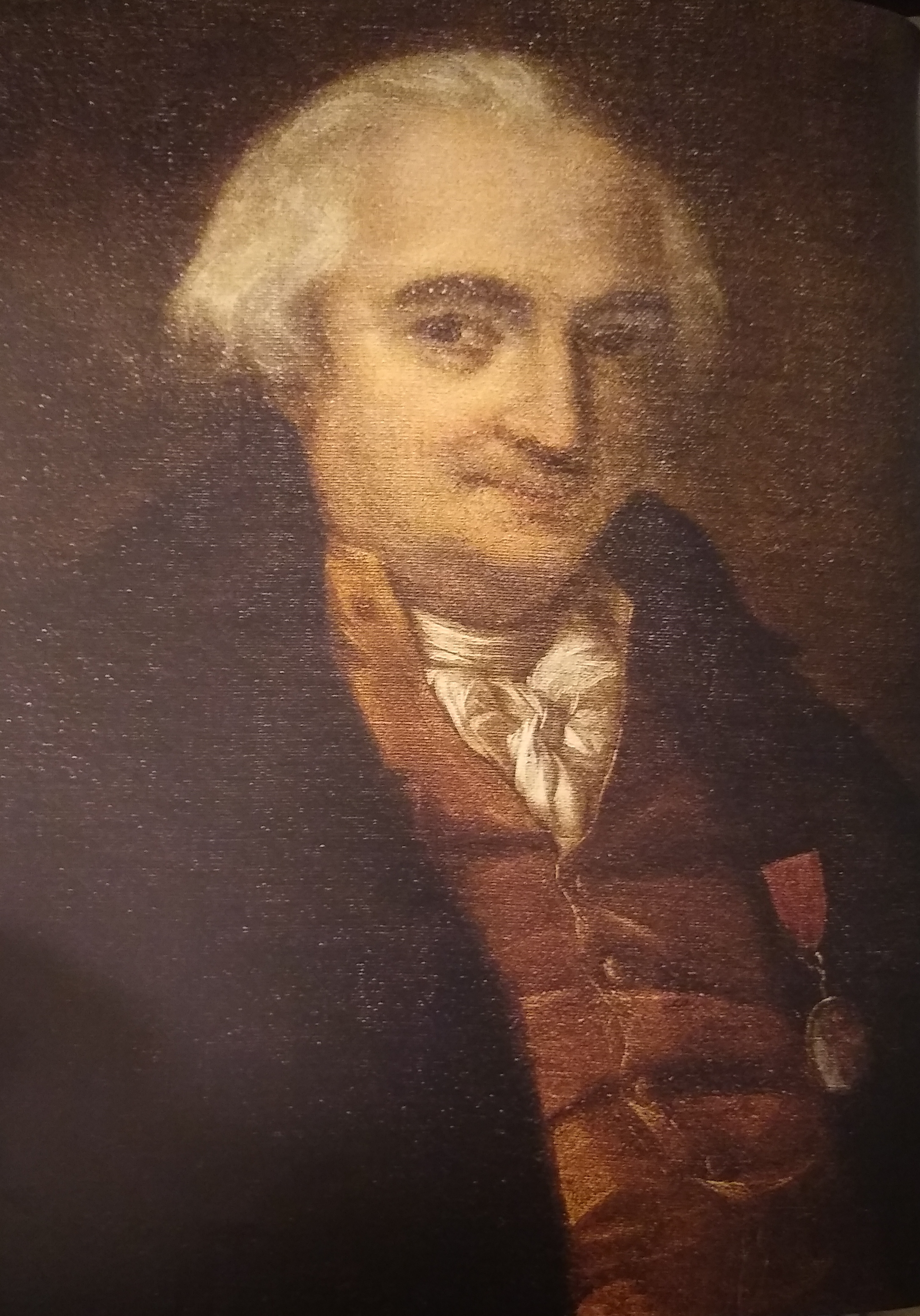
Portrait of Pablo de Olavide. 18th century. Donated by Bartolomé Soriano y Arellano to the City Council of La Carolina in 1907. Restored in 2014. Museum of La Carolina.

The winter of 1767 was harsh and Thürriegel had promised the settlers an ideal climate. In November, a storm knocked down tents and makeshift camps where the first settlers were precariously housed. Gijón remedied, as far as possible, by building barracks and installing employees in the old Carmelite monastery of La Peñuela.

In 1767 Fuente Palmera was also founded (which until 2018 administratively encompassed Fuente Carreteros).

In October 1767 the plots of land were granted. In February 1768 Olavide, with the approval of the Council of Castile, made a police and administration regulation fixing the conditions for the election of the first mayors and prohibiting the settlers from abandoning their lands. He created inspectors to monitor the work. These kept a book indicating the progress in clearing. However, these inspectors did not know much about agriculture and limited themselves to reporting that everything was going well without making the necessary checks. For this reason, Olavide had to inspect the lands personally. As these measures had little result, Olavide set a minimum extension to be cleared each day and locked up the most recalcitrant settlers in jail.

The foreign Capuchins, as they belonged to a religious order, declared themselves free from the jurisdiction of the bishop and the French priest Duval Lanes. Some of the Capuchins began to campaign against the Nuevas Poblaciones, some of their complaints reaching Switzerland, which jeopardized the arrival of new settlers from that country.

In a letter of 3 January 1769 Gijón made a compilation of the complaints expressed on multiple occasions throughout the previous year: most of the settlers are "absolutely useless" for the fields, since out of every hundred only ten knew what a plow was; in a working day they clear a tenth of what any Andalusian peasant would do; most refuse to work the land, because they have never done it; many ask for a passport to return to their country; others desert, abandoning their families.

The newly arrived settlers had no resources to support themselves. In November 1767, under the pretext of carrying out an inventory, the Council of Castile suspended the arrival of wheat from the expelled Jesuits. In winter, the rains made the roads unusable, making it difficult for materials to arrive. To avoid hunger in 1768 the Five Major Guilds of Madrid were entrusted with the supply of bread to the colonies. The Minister of Finance, seeing that colonization only generated expenses, asked Olavide on 2 September when this situation would end. Olavide replied that the expenses were due to the construction of houses, the purchase of tools and livestock and the delivery of bread to the settlers.

In the summer of 1768 the colonies were overwhelmed by the heat and reduced by epidemics. In August, Gijón himself fell ill with typhus. The hospital could not care for all the sick and mortality was very high. Mortality decreased in autumn, although in November 150 people still died and 55 in December. In December 1768 Gijón wrote to Olavide that the survivors were cadaverous.

In 1768 favorable responses began to be given to requests from Spaniards, especially from the regions of Valencia and Catalonia, who wished to settle in the Nuevas Poblaciones under the same conditions as foreigners.

In 1768 the current municipalities of Aldeaquemada, Arquillos and Carboneros were founded.

On 20 May 1768 a new territorial district began, the Nuevas Poblaciones de Andalusia, south of Sierra Morena, to settle the settlers. A new settlement was installed where the Hacienda de San Sebastián de los Ballesteros was located, which had belonged to the College of Santa Catalina de Córdoba, of the Jesuits. Another settlement was created in the Cortijo de La Parrilla, belonging to the Council of Córdoba. La Parrilla would change its name to La Carlota. The administration of this new territory was first installed in buildings that the Jesuits had in San Sebastián de los Ballesteros, but in December 1768 the administrative building of La Carlota was completed, locating here the subdelegation for the new municipalities south of Sierra Morena.

In the wastelands of Mochales the parish of La Luisiana would be founded, which would include the villages of Cañada Rosal (independent municipality since 1986), El Campillo and Los Motillos (disappeared in the mid-19th century).

At the end of 1768 the first settlers began to arrive in La Luisiana, although the largest contingent of people arrived from March to October 1769.

In 1769 Cañada Rosal was founded. At the end of that year Montizón was founded.

In the summer of 1769 epidemics of tertian fever and intestinal obstructions began, which especially affected Fuente Palmera and La Luisiana, leaving a great mortality.

In August 1768 Thürriegel sent Campomanes a memoir written by a German chaplain of Sierra Morena, Johann Gloecker, in which it is stated that the settlers "live tyrannized groaning under oppression; they are worse than on the island of Cayenne". The government commissioned the bishop of Jaén to investigate its veracity and he, weeks later, declared that most of what Gloecker stated was false. It was said that the bread was inedible and he certified that it was good, it had been said that there were houses in ruins but he had not found any in that state and it had also been indicated that the employees behaved indecently but he had seen that they behaved correctly.

Joseph Yauch, who had only managed to bring twelve families of the hundred he had committed himself to, also attacked the functioning of the colonies by sending a memoir in March 1769 with things that the bishop of Jaén had already denied. The Swiss asked for a new inspection to be sent. Campomanes agreed to send a visitor to the colonies. The Count of Aranda sent Ricardo Wall and the Marquis of la Corona. Olavide was satisfied with the state of the colonies and raised no objection.

However, Olavide was dissatisfied in April 1769 when he learned that a visitor with full powers, Pedro Pérez Valiente, was to be sent. By decision of Gijón, Pérez Valiente was guided by Joseph Branly. The first report that Pérez Valiente sent to Minister Múzquiz was favorable: the land was of good quality and the harvest promised. Pérez Valiente suspended, with a futile pretext, the payment to Duval Lanes, changed details of the reliefs of one of the columns of La Carlota, and began to listen with pleasure to the complaints of the inhabitants of Écija, declared enemies of the colonies. Gijón, after several clashes with this inspector, presented his resignation, although neither Minister Múzquiz nor Aranda accepted it. Quintanilla did the same weeks later.

On 18 July the Count of Aranda declared the visit of Pérez Valiente terminated, although he ignored it and continued the inspection until the Council of Castile, imperatively, called him to return on 24 August. He then abandoned his duties in the colonies.

Ricardo Wall's inspection was favorable, even stating that: "Those who censure his conduct [Olavide's] should come and see it and speak afterwards, for none of them would be capable of doing not to say as much, but not even half". The inspection of the Marquis of la Corona coincided in May with that of Pérez Valiente and sent a report to the Council of Castile criticizing some of his decisions, such as having tried to move a locality that already had a hospital, church and some good houses.

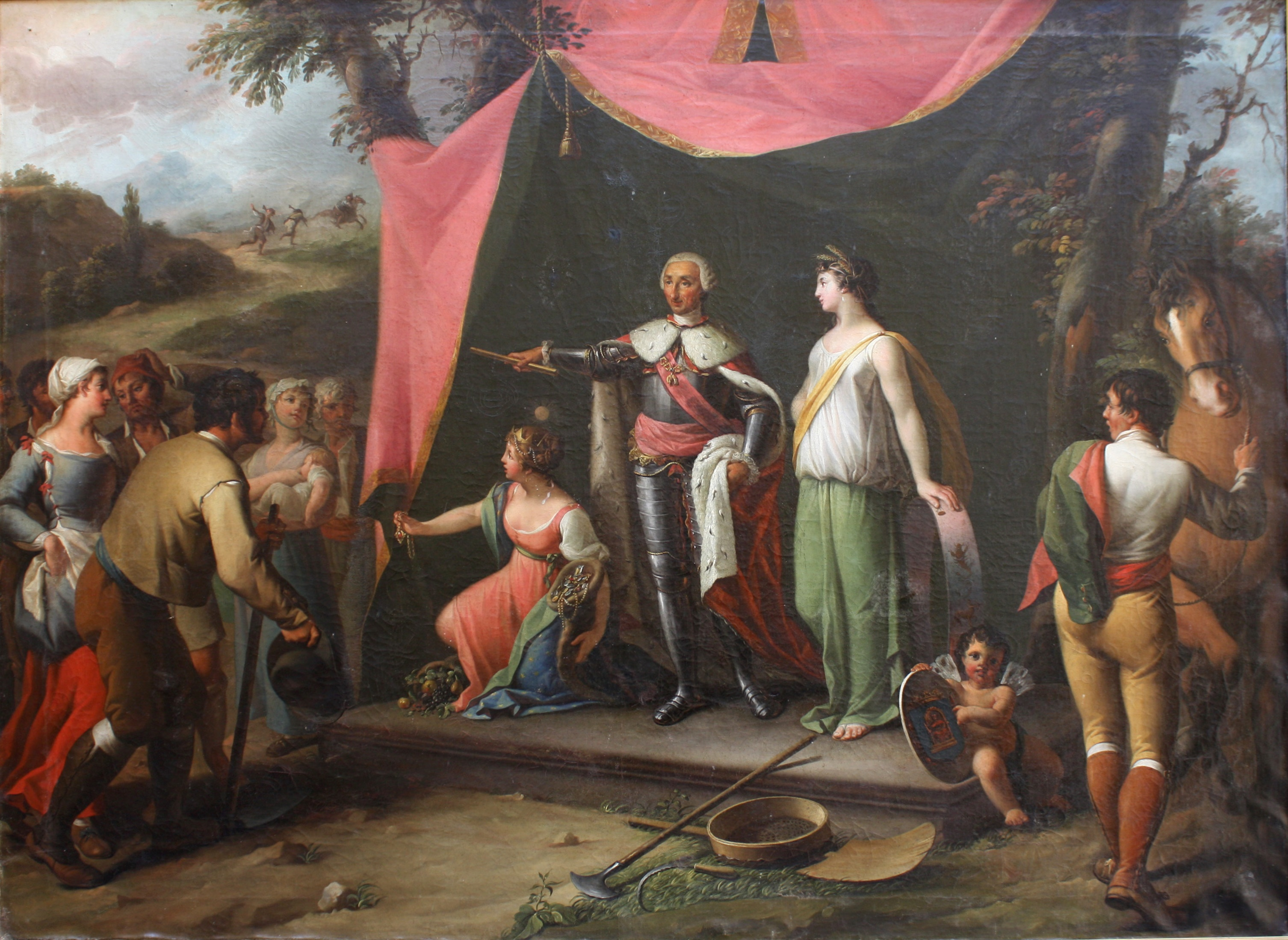
"King Charles III founds the colony of La Carolina", by Victorino López Herranz. 1805. Oil on canvas. 124.5 × 167 cm. Alcázar of Segovia.

A report by Pérez Valiente, sent to the Count of Aranda at the beginning of November 1769, is very critical of the colonies: anarchy and improvisation in the reception given to the settlers who lack material and spiritual care; not all have received the 50 fanegas of land, as required by the 1767 charter; the excessive dispersion of the farms makes mutual help between peasants impossible and prevents all social life; excessive number of employees with their corresponding salaries at the king's expense; complaints from neighboring towns, who say they have been dispossessed of their lands; and deceptions to create a good impression on travelers, such as placing the best worked lands on the sides of the road. Pérez Valiente proposes that a certain number of already built towns should be abandoned and others reduced.

The fiscal Campomanes found contradictions in Pérez Valiente's report and considered that his observations were not supported by testimonies from the settlers. Finally, he considered that, although it was necessary to impose reforms in the colonies, these should be implemented by Olavide himself, since it would be risky for someone not familiar with the system to do so. In April 1770 Olavide himself testified before the Board that he had sent Pérez Valiente to the colonies and his explanations were convincing.

However, the Marquis of la Corona began to criticize Olavide's work before the Board with Pérez Valiente's arguments and proposed that the Count of Aranda, assisted by a fiscal, visit the colonies. The Count of Aranda refused.

On 6 July 1770 the Board drew up instructions that put an end to colonization. Some lands should be abandoned because of their unhealthiness or mediocre fertility. Useless settlers would be dismissed and no others would be taken unless necessary. New constructions should be kept to a minimum and several administrative employees would be dismissed. It was also necessary to begin to deal with the end of the indemnity in money and kind to the settlers, since the development of local agriculture made it unnecessary. To ensure resources for the settlers, livestock farming would be encouraged in the neighboring mountains and industries destined for the local market would be created. Olavide would retain financial authority and continue to direct the colonies, but judicial authority passed to the chief mayors. The priest Duval Lanes, who had created a kind of ecclesiastical regulation, was confirmed in his functions as vicar and chief chaplain, with authority over other clergy of the Nuevas Poblaciones. These instructions were communicated to Olavide in September 1770.

In 1772 the Capuchins sent a letter to the general of the order complaining of ill-treatment they received from the heads of the colonies. These complaints were vague and did not point to specific facts, but were transmitted to the prime minister Jerónimo Grimaldi and to Olavide. Olavide instructed the vicar Juan Lanes Duval to have each Capuchin explain his reasons for discontent. Fray Romualdo de Friburgo, a Capuchin who had arrived in 1770, declared that he had no complaint to make and the rest refused to answer before him.

Fray Romualdo de Friburgo began to introduce among the German settlers the fraternum foedus, a mixture of commercial society, savings bank and insurance company.

Over time, settlers from the Spanish Levant began to arrive and the colonies began to become Hispanicized. Hispanicization was especially strong in La Carolina, where the installation of factories had attracted numerous workers and artisans from other Spanish regions, especially from Catalonia. Unable to ensure spiritual or worldly direction in the future of the Nuevas Poblaciones, he became predisposed against the colonies and in 1774 began trying to provoke and facilitate desertions and organize rebellions against the public administration. On 27 March 1776 the Council of Castile sent the king a report requesting the expulsion of this Capuchin friar. Perhaps warned of this, Romualdo left the Nuevas Poblaciones and abandoned Spain after the summer of that year.

However, Fray Romualdo had already attracted to his cause the confessor of King Charles III and counselor of the Inquisition Fray Joaquín de Eleta. In addition, in 1775 Fray Romualdo had denounced Olavide to the Inquisition of Córdoba, providing two long memoirs with all his alleged errors in matters of faith. The inquiries of the Inquisition of Seville about Olavide for other causes and the denunciations of the Inquisition of Córdoba about the same went to the Council of the Supreme Inquisition, which was the only one that could judge Olavide. On 31 October 1775 the Inquisitor General addressed King Charles III with a request to proceed against Olavide. The monarch accepted and ordered Olavide to be summoned to Madrid. In December 1775 Olavide went to the Court, leaving the Nuevas Poblaciones.

In 1774 Tomás Francisco Prieto and Jerónimo Antonio Gil made a medal that on one side had the face of Charles III and on the other an allegory of the establishment of these colonies. Today, the medal is preserved in the Prado Museum in Madrid.

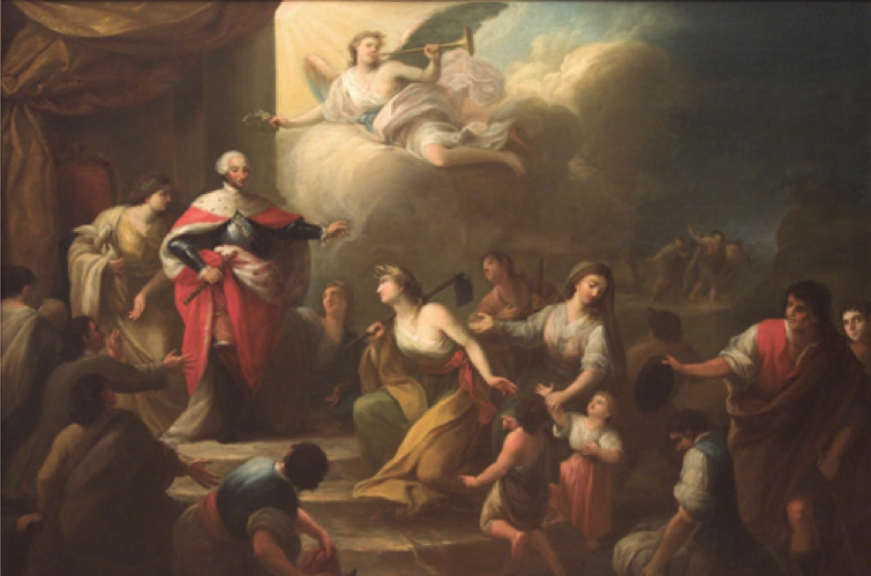
"Charles III carrying out the project to populate Sierra Morena", by Francisco Lacoma Sans. 1805. Oil on canvas. 126 × 168 cm. Royal Catalan Academy of Fine Arts of Saint George. Barcelona.

On 25 May 1775 the subdelegate Fernando de Quintanilla told Superintendent Olavide that all the lands in his demarcation were already occupied. A survey of some lands was carried out and possession was taken of the wastelands of the towns of Hornachuelos and Espiel for a future extension of the colonization project in May 1776 in the Sierra del Tardón. (Note: The military engineer José de Ampudia y Valdés made the topographical plan of the Sierra de Tardón in 1761; see: Capel Sáez, Horacio (1983). Los Ingenieros militares en España, siglo XVIII: repertorio biográfico e inventario de su labor científica y espacial (in Spanish). Barcelona: Edicions Universitat Barcelona. p. 36. ISBN 9788475281179. OCLC 434000254.) Finally the new lands were not only used to obtain income from the leasing of the pastures, and to be able to face the expenses of the treasury of the Nuevas Poblaciones, but also to a lesser extent for the settlers' livestock. But despite being necessary for the Nuevas Poblaciones de Andalusia the Crown sold these lands in the Sierra del Tardón to pay its debts, one part in 1779 and the rest in 1799.

The Nuevas Poblaciones de Andalusia met with opposition from Écija. This is because for the foundation of La Luisiana 10,066 fanegas of land were taken from it and for the foundation of Fuente Palmera and La Carlota 5,804 fanegas were taken from it. For the wasteland lands there was no compensation from the government and, with the foundations, Écija lost 65% of its wasteland lands, which were used for grazing livestock, wood supply, charcoal production, etc. The people of Écija even burned houses and crops of the settlers. In August 1769 two companies of light infantry from Catalonia had to arrive to prevent it. Charles III signed a decree on 17 October 1769 imposing severe penalties on arsonists and those who stole livestock from the settlers.

In 1791 there was an intention to create settlements in the area of the Monclova Castle, but this project failed in 1792 due to the opposition of the Marquis of Ariza and Count of Monclova, owner of the lands.

In 1805 the Royal Academy of Fine Arts of San Fernando in Madrid called a painting competition on the theme of the foundation of the Nuevas Poblaciones by Charles III. The first prize went to the work of José Alonso del Rivero and the second prize to that of José de Odriozola y Oñativia. Other paintings for this competition that have been preserved are those of Victorino López Herranz, Francisco Lacoma Sans and Felipe Abás Aranda.

== Nuevas Poblaciones of the 18th century not governed by the Charter of 1767 ==
Pablo de Olavide founded in 1768 the settlements of Armajal and Prado del Rey, on lands that had belonged to the Council of Seville, with inhabitants from the Sierra de Grazalema and the Serranía de Ronda. Both ended up forming the municipality of Prado del Rey. Olavide also supported the creation, by Domingo López de Carvajal, of the settlement of Algar in 1775. These settlements did not benefit from the charter of 1767.

== Bibliography ==
- Alcázar Molina, Cayetano (1930). Las colonias alemanas de Sierra Morena. Notas y documentos para su historia [The German colonies of Sierra Morena. Notes and documents for their history] (in Spanish). Madrid: Universidad de Murcia. OCLC 929413747.
- Hamer Flores, Adolfo (2009). La intendencia de las poblaciones de Sierra Morena y Andalucía, 1784-1835. Gobierno y administración de un territorio foral a fines de la Edad Moderna [The Administration of the towns of Sierra Morena and Andalusia, 1784-1835. Government and administration of a regional territory at the end of the Modern Age] (in Spanish). Córdoba: CajaSur. ISBN 9788478019823. OCLC 420939869.
- Burgos Alonso, Manuel (2003). Historia de España 2 [History of Spain 2] (in Spanish). Bachillerato. Seville: Algaida Editores. ISBN 84-8433-324-8. OCLC 433167265.
- "El escudo de la Intendencia de Nuevas Poblaciones", in Boletín del Centro de Estudios Neopoblacionales, 2016; 9 and 10.
- Defourneaux, Marcelin (1990). Pablo de Olavide. El afrancesado [Pablo de Olavide. The Frenchified] (in Spanish). Seville: Padilla Libros. ISBN 84-87039-32-4.
- Fílter Rodríguez, José Antonio (2018). Inmigrantes centroeuropeos en la Andalucía del siglo XVIII [Central European immigrants in 18th-century Andalusia] (in Spanish). Ayuntamiento de Cañada Rosal y Ayuntamiento de La Luisiana. ISBN 978-84-697-6468-8.
- Pérez-Schmid Fernández, Francisco José (2020). Colonos y propietarios de las Nuevas Poblaciones de Sierra Morena [Settlers and landowners of the New Towns of Sierra Morena] (in Spanish). Fundación de Municipios Pablo de Olavide. ISBN 978-84-120123-2-3.

== External links. ==
- Media related to Nuevas Poblaciones de Sierra Morena y Andalucía at Wikimedia Commons
- La Ilustración de Sierra Morena y Andalucía (in Spanish)..
- Centro de Estudios Neopoblacionales (in Spanish).
