= La Carolina =

- Municipality
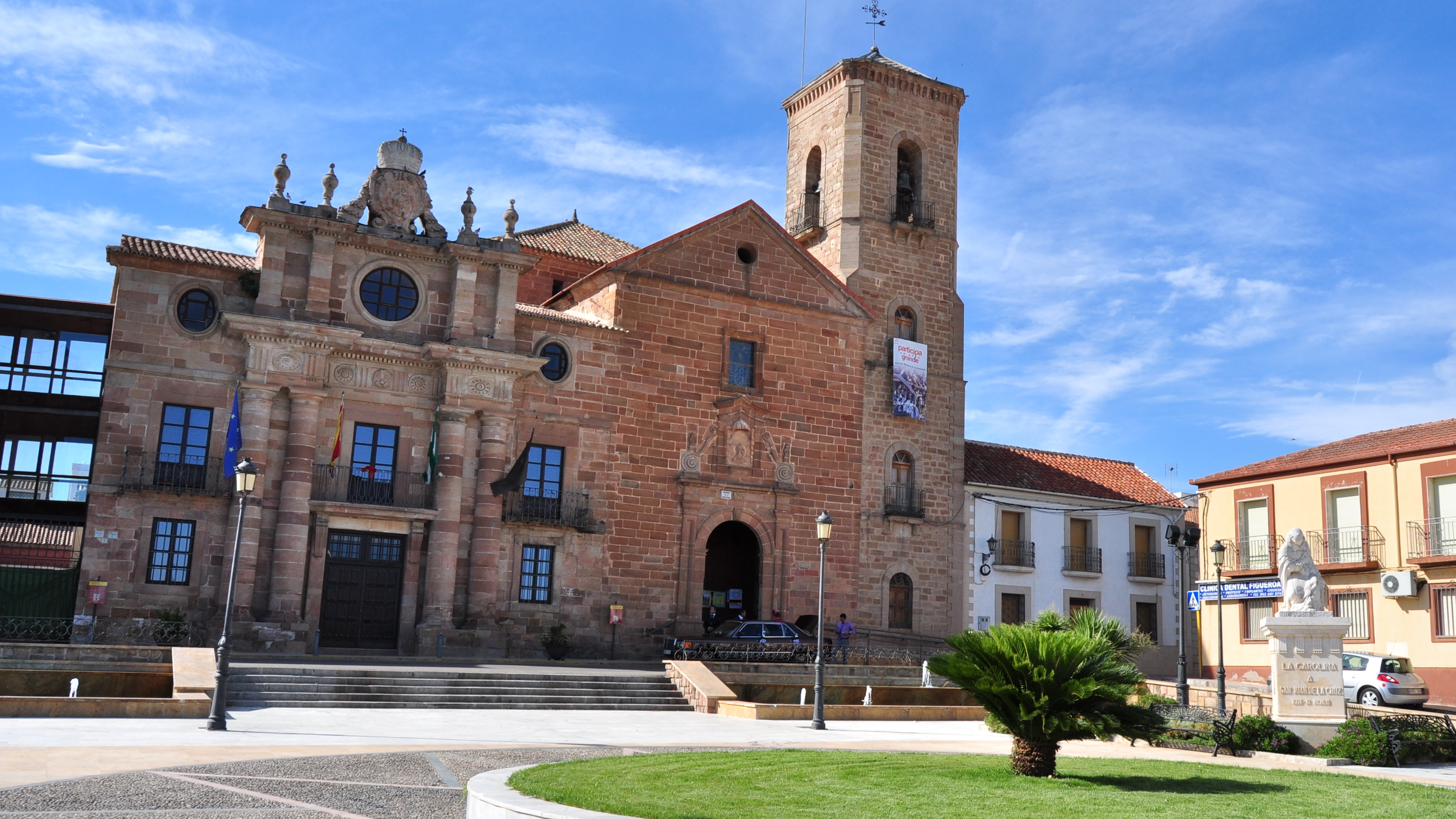

- Flag Coat of arms

- Location in Spain La Carolina (Andalusia) La Carolina (Spain)
- Coordinates: 38°16′N 3°37′W
- Country: Spain
- Autonomous community: Andalusia
- Province: Jaén
- Municipality: La Carolina

Area
  - Total: 201 km^{2} (78 sq mi)
- Elevation: 595 m (1,952 ft)

Population (2025-01-01)
  - Total: 14,677
  - Density: 73.0/km^{2} (189/sq mi)
- Time zone: UTC+1 (CET)
  - Summer (DST): UTC+2 (CEST)

La Carolina is a city and municipality located in the province of Jaén, Spain. According to the 2024 census, the municipality has a population of 14,681 inhabitants.

== History ==
La Carolina was formerly the capital of the Intendencia of the Nuevas Poblaciones de Sierra Morena y Andalucía founded in this formerly remote and desolate area of the Sierra Morena in 1767 by King Charles III. The object of the plan, drawn up by his minister Pablo de Olavide, administrator of Andalusia, was to populate the area around Despeñaperros gorge. Known as "the gateway to Andalusia", this pass was a notorious point on the Cádiz-to-Madrid route for bandits. Other towns of note in this plan were La Carlota and La Luisiana. The Intendencia administrative division was wrapped up in 1813.

Six thousand Catholic settlers arrived from Belgium, Germany, Austria and Switzerland to take advantage of the generous offers of land and livestock being made to colonizers (five chickens, five goats, five sheep, two cows, and a sow per family). Within a few years, about half of them had died from illness or gone home: the rest gradually lost their national identities over the years, and took on the language and customs of their host country. One can still find people in this area with Germanic surnames such as Eisman, Minch, Clap, Smidt, Ming and Kobler.

The town's relatively recent history, as well as its northern European target population, explains its unusually regular, colonial-style grid layout, with wide avenues, as opposed to the more common winding narrow streets typical of the Moorish-patterned towns in Andalusia.

=== Towns of the Intendencia ===
==== Became later part of Jaén Province ====
- Aldeaquemada
- Arquillos
- Carboneros
- La Carolina
- Concepción de Almuradiel
- Guarromán
- Miranda del Rey, a village of Santa Elena municipality
- Magaña-Montizón, Magaña is a village of Santa Elena municipality
- Navas de Tolosa, a village of La Carolina municipality
- Santa Elena

==== Became later part of Córdoba Province ====
- La Carlota
- La Luisiana
- Fuente Palmera
- San Sebastián de los Ballesteros

== Notable people ==
- Custodia Romero (1905–1974), flamenco dancer and actress

== See also ==
- Battle of Las Navas de Tolosa
- List of municipalities in Jaén
