= Arquillos =

Arquillos, Spain
- municipality
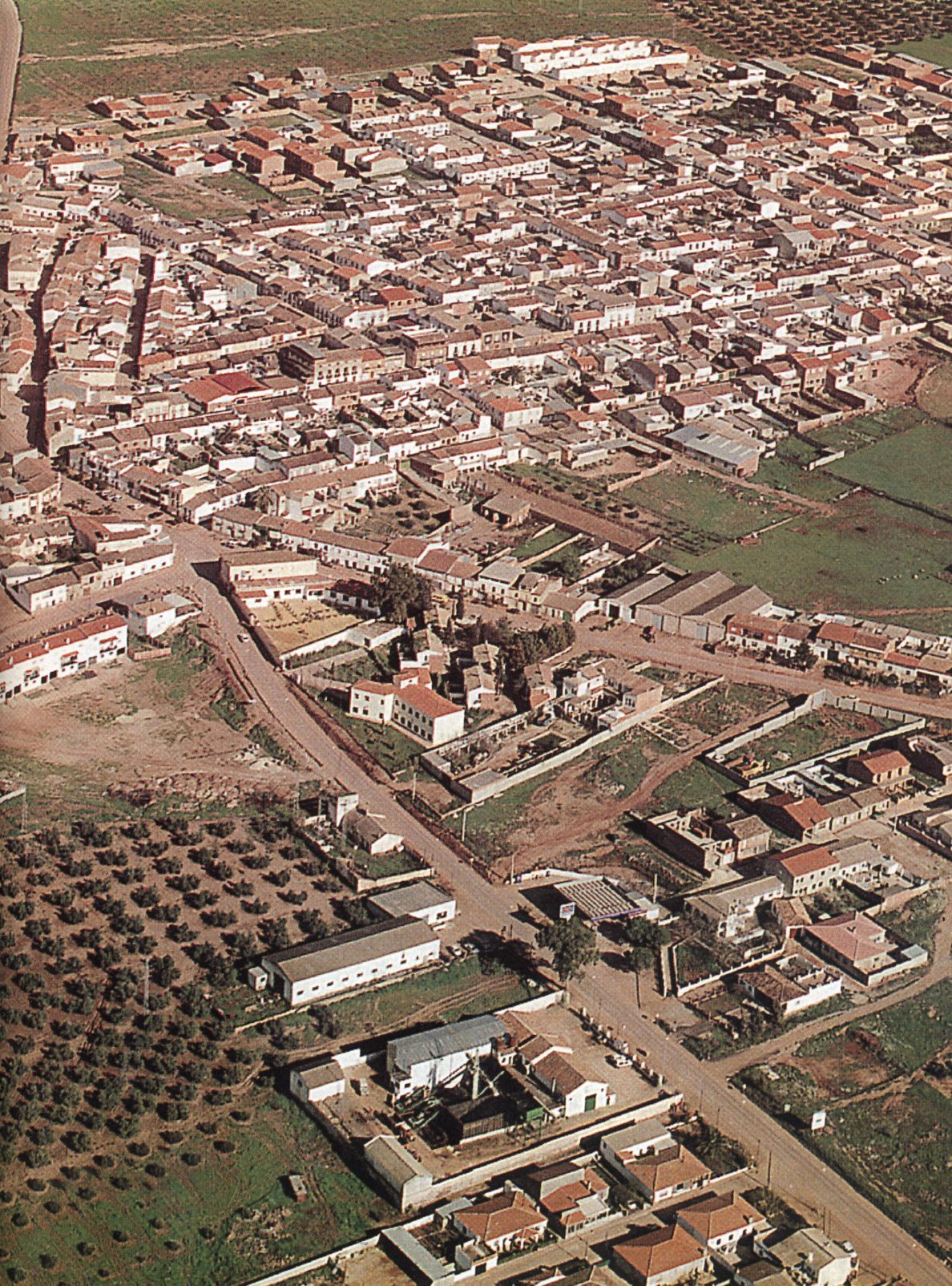

- Flag Coat of arms

- Location in the Province of Jaén Arquillos (Andalusia) Arquillos (Spain)
- Coordinates: 38°11′N 3°25′W
- Country: Spain
- Autonomous community: Andalusia
- Province: Jaén
- Municipality: Arquillos

Area
  - Total: 65 km^{2} (25 sq mi)
- Elevation: 378 m (1,240 ft)

Population (2025-01-01)
  - Total: 1,682
  - Density: 26/km^{2} (67/sq mi)
- Time zone: UTC+1 (CET)
  - Summer (DST): UTC+2 (CEST)
- Website: http://www.arquillos.es/

Arquillos is a town and municipality in the province of Jaén, in Andalusia, Spain, in the comarca of El Condado at the southern edge of the Sierra Morena. It was founded in 1768 as one of the New Settlements of Sierra Morena, and its municipality includes the hamlet of El Porrosillo.

== History ==
=== Roman road and the old inn ===
The Roman road from Castulo to Saetabis, recorded on the Vicarello Cups and linked by some authors to the Via Augusta, ran through the area: after crossing the Guadalén River on the Puente Mocho, below the oppidum of Giribaile, it passed "between the two Arquillos, new and old" on its way to the mansio of Ad Morum, at Navas de San Juan.

The place takes its name from the Venta de los Arquillos, an inn on the road from Valencia to Andalusia. In the 17th century the inn belonged to the Duke of Arcos. On 5 December 1668 the future Grand Duke of Tuscany Cosimo III de' Medici stopped there on his journey through Spain, after hearing mass in a small nearby chapel owned by the Jesuits, known as the Teatino; the painter Pier Maria Baldi, who accompanied him, drew a view of the inn. Baldi's views follow the order of the journey: from Villanueva de los Infantes the party travelled by the Venta Nueva and the Venta de San Andrés, near Santisteban del Puerto, to Arquillos and on to Linares.

The Venta de los Arquillos in 1668, by Pier Maria Baldi

=== New Settlement ===
Under the Fuero de Población of 1767, by which Charles III entrusted Pablo de Olavide with the colonisation of the Sierra Morena, a new settlement was planned in 1768 around the Teatino chapel; it was briefly to be called Campomanía, after Campomanes, but the old name prevailed. The colony kept the regular grid plan of the New Settlements and was governed by their special charter until the intendancy was abolished on 5 March 1835.

=== Capture of General Riego ===
On 15 September 1823, at the end of the Trienio Liberal, General Rafael del Riego was captured at a farmhouse in the municipal area of Arquillos by the colonists, led by their civil commander, Josef Antonio Araque, and taken that same day to the royal prison of La Carolina. The Gaceta de Madrid stressed that the commander of Arquillos had acted "with his colonists alone, and without a soldier". In 2023 Arquillos commemorated the bicentenary of the capture, and a plaque was placed on the façade of the Casa del Comandante.

== Guadalén Reservoir ==
The Guadalén Reservoir, inaugurated in 1953, lies partly in the municipal area. In a letter of 12 July 1957 the Guadalquivir Hydrographic Confederation (CHG) refused to return unflooded land to 59 expropriated owners, arguing that 1,000 hectares had been put under irrigation as compensation; the town council maintains that none of that land lies in Arquillos, and in 2026 it asked for this "historical water debt" to be recognised in the Guadalquivir river basin plan for 2028–2033.

== Festivals ==
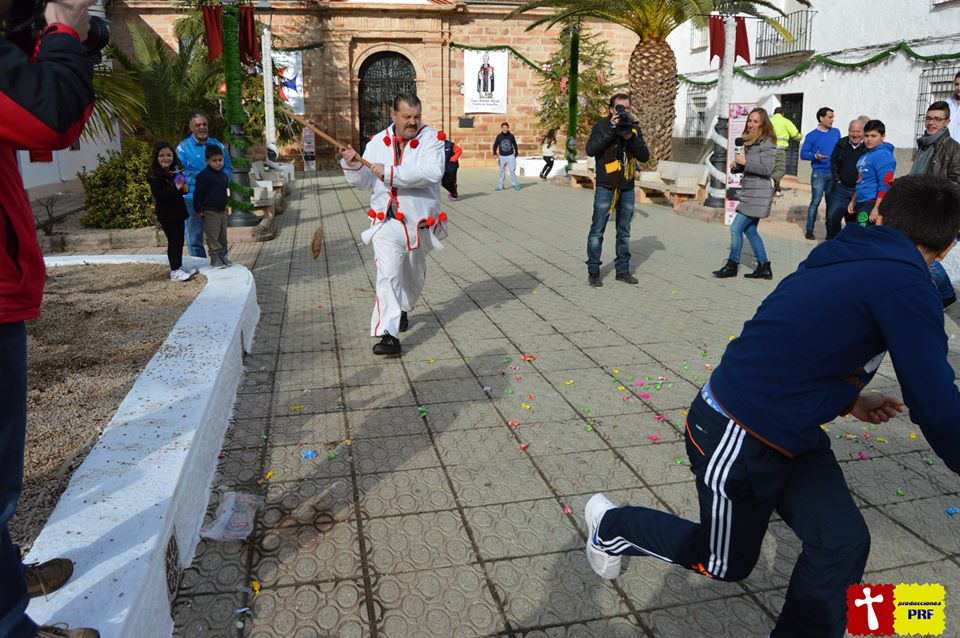
The Pelotero during the Saint Anthony festivities

The town's patron is Saint Anthony the Abbot, celebrated from 16 to 18 January with a bonfire, processions, the renewal by the mayor of a collective vow made during a cholera epidemic, and the Pelotero, a masked figure dressed in white who chases people with an old espadrille tied to a stick and is not recorded in any other of the New Settlements. The festivities were declared a Festival of Tourist Interest of Andalusia in 2024.

== Transport ==
In the environmental assessment of the A-32 motorway between Linares and Albacete, a northern corridor along the A-312 road through Arquillos and Santisteban del Puerto was studied alongside a southern one through Úbeda; the 2006 environmental impact statement chose the southern corridor, citing its lower impact on the Iberian lynx, although the councils of Arquillos and other municipalities of El Condado had argued for the northern route. The town is reached from Linares by the A-312.

== See also ==
- List of municipalities in Jaén
- Nuevas Poblaciones de Sierra Morena y Andalucía
