= Despeñaperros Pass =

Mountain pass through Andalusia and Spanish Meseta

- Spanish: Paso de Despeñaperros
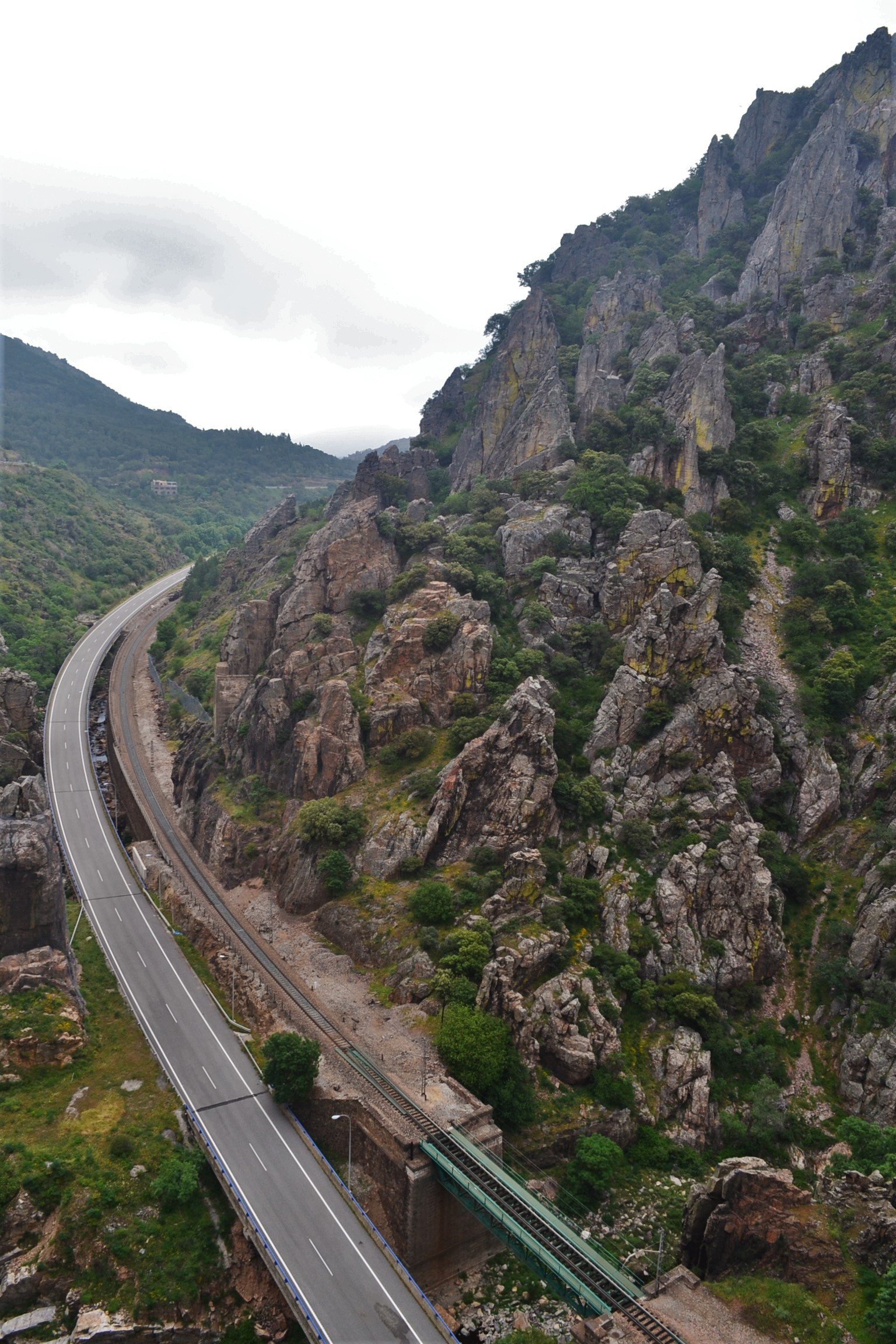
- Former part of the road and the current Madrid-Cádiz railway line

- Location within Spain
- Elevation: 663 metres (2,175 ft)
- Length: 9 kilometres (5.6 mi)
- Traversed by: E-5 A-4 N-IV; Alcázar de San Juan–Cádiz railway

Third Approach
- Location: Santa Elena, Andalusia - Venta de Cárdenas, Castilla-La Mancha
- Range: Sierra Morena
- Coordinates: 38°23′10″N 3°30′25″W

The Despeñaperros Pass has been a strategic location for transport between Andalusia and the Spanish Meseta (central plateau of Spain) throughout history. Both by road and rail, this pass has been crucial in facilitating the transit of people and goods between the two regions. With the rugged geography of the Pass, full of canyons and gorges, the landscape has spurred the creation of impressive engineering works in the history of transport in Spain, such as bridges and tunnels. These works facilitated the economic and social growth of the region. Today, the Despeñaperros Pass continues to be a vital artery for vehicle and train traffic.

The chronological evolution of the Pass can be summarized as follows: Iturbide's attempt to create the road and its completion by Lemaur; the road's adaptation to the CNFE; (Note: Circuito Nacional de Firmes Especiales, literally National circuit of special road surfaces) the successive improvements to the N-IV road; the doubling of the roadway in the 1980s and finally, the opening of the new A-4 highway.

The railway line has maintained the same track (except for minor fixes) since it was built.

== History ==
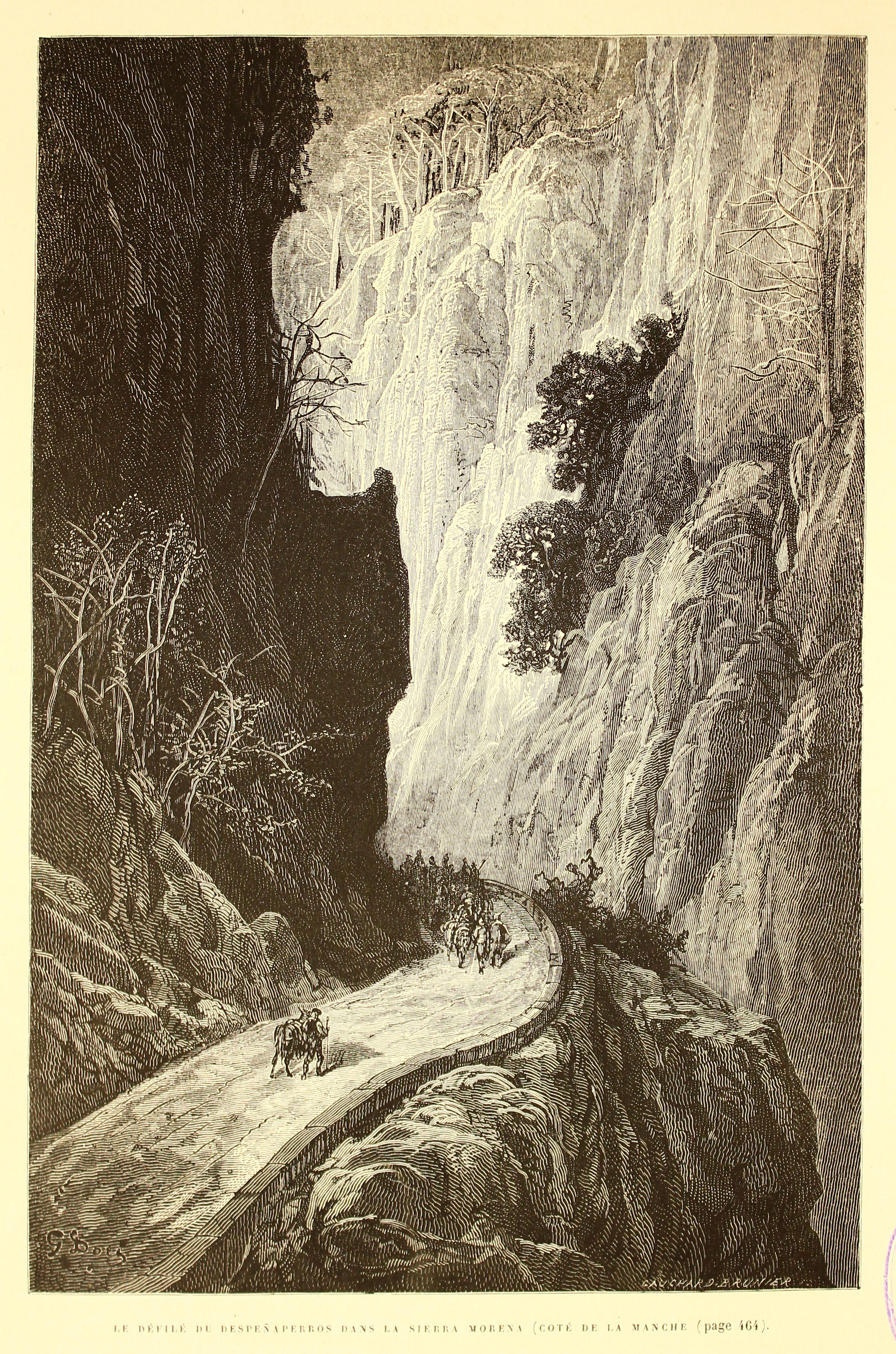
Illustration of Despeñaperros Pass (coming from La Mancha) by Gustave Doré, for Jean Charles Davillier's L'Espagne. Paris: Librairie Hachette, 1874.

The main routes between the exterior of present-day Andalusia were the Tartessian way from Cadiz and Seville to the northern peninsular ports, later known as the Silver Way (Vía de la Plata), and the Roman way between Cadiz and Rome, known as Via Augusta. The former went up northwards along the entire western part of the peninsula and the latter road reached the Mediterranean coast after crossing the Guadalquivir valley from west to east.

Before the Despeñaperros Pass, routes to Andalusia from the Meseta forked out from Toledo either to the southwest, towards the valley of the Alcudia and the Guadalquivir or, for travellers headed to Jaén or Granada, southeast towards the Muradal Pass in the Sierra Morena range, near Despeñaperros.

Before the construction of this road, the previous mountain passes were, during the Middle Ages, the Del Rey, Muladar, and De Olavide passes, mostly to the west of the current Despeñaperros Pass. Routes between Andalusia and La Mancha went back to Toledo, through Brazatortas, Puertollano and Ciudad Real among others.

With the establishment of the court and capital in Madrid, trade of goods and people between the capital and the ports bound for the Americas became increasingly important. Seville, followed by Cadiz, sought easier access to Madrid from 1717 onward. (Note: In fact, the idea for making the road came following the transfer of the Casa de Contratación, the Crown's agency for the Spanish Empire, from Seville to Cádiz in 1717.)

With the opening of the Pass from the entrance to Andalusia, the old roads to Toledo were abandoned. The road from Madrid to Andalusia would take the same route towards Toledo, but turn south once past the Puente de Toledo.

As cars became popular, the road underwent numerous modifications. Today, it is adapted to high volumes of traffic that are recorded year after year, especially during the summer months. (Note: Maghrebi migrants cross the Strait of Gibraltar by ferry to return to their countries of origin)

== Road Pass ==
=== Lemaur Pass ===
Iturbide & Lemaur road layout

With the transfer of the port of the Americas from Seville to Cádiz, goods arriving via Cádiz or outgoing to the Americas had to go over El Rey Pass, which was a difficult route through Sierra Morena from Andalusia to Castille. The weight of the freight and the steep slopes made this trip exhausting for horses. The transportation on this Madrid-Cádiz route had to be flexible, as delays would have repercussions for ships heading towards the Americas. The 1720 Postal Agreement included Cádiz as the point of the contact with the Americas at the expense of Seville. By 1761, the first rules and regulations for roads and trails for carts had been published.

Pablo de Olavide's New Settlements plan commenced in 1767 (Note: The Nuevas Poblaciones (New Settlements) plan to populate deserted areas on the way to Cádiz from Madrid. The villages founded were in the part of Sierra Morena (just this area) and in Andalucía (among Seville and Córdoba)) in Sierra Morena. The plan was devised to help the Pass support cargo freight and stagecoaches, create replacement points for horses and rest areas for travelers. Once achieved, several previously unsafe areas that were often targeted by brigands became more popular for travel, and the Pass served increasingly as a superior route between Madrid and Cadiz.

"Se considera el único que se puede sacar mayor provecho, por ser más corto, más llano and más permanente entre Santa Elena a Santa Cruz".

It is considered the only route that is better suited, as it is shorter, flatter and the most permanent one between Santa Elena and Santa Cruz.

— J. Iturbide

=== CNFE itinerary ===
CNFE road layout

The road was improved for automobile use by the modification of bends and improved cants or cambers.

=== N-IV Road ===
N-IV road layout

The adaptation of the old road (Route IX) for the new N-IV entailed improving curves and widening the roadway.

Then, in the 1950s, the largest modification took place: the opening of the Niebla Tunnel (in the ravine of the same name) and the elimination of the dangerous curve that followed it.

In 1984, the road was doubled in length. A new carriageway was built, but the old one was used halfway in each direction. (Note: The system developed in this improvement of the road was used Saltire shape for two roads: The old road was used for the road from Ventas de Cárdenas towards Cádiz at Las Correderas, that in this point changes to new road and vice-versa towards Madrid.) From Santa Elena to the mid-point, the old carriageway would be used towards Madrid, and from the mid-point to Venta de Cárdenas, it would be used towards Cádiz.

=== Current A-4 motorway ===
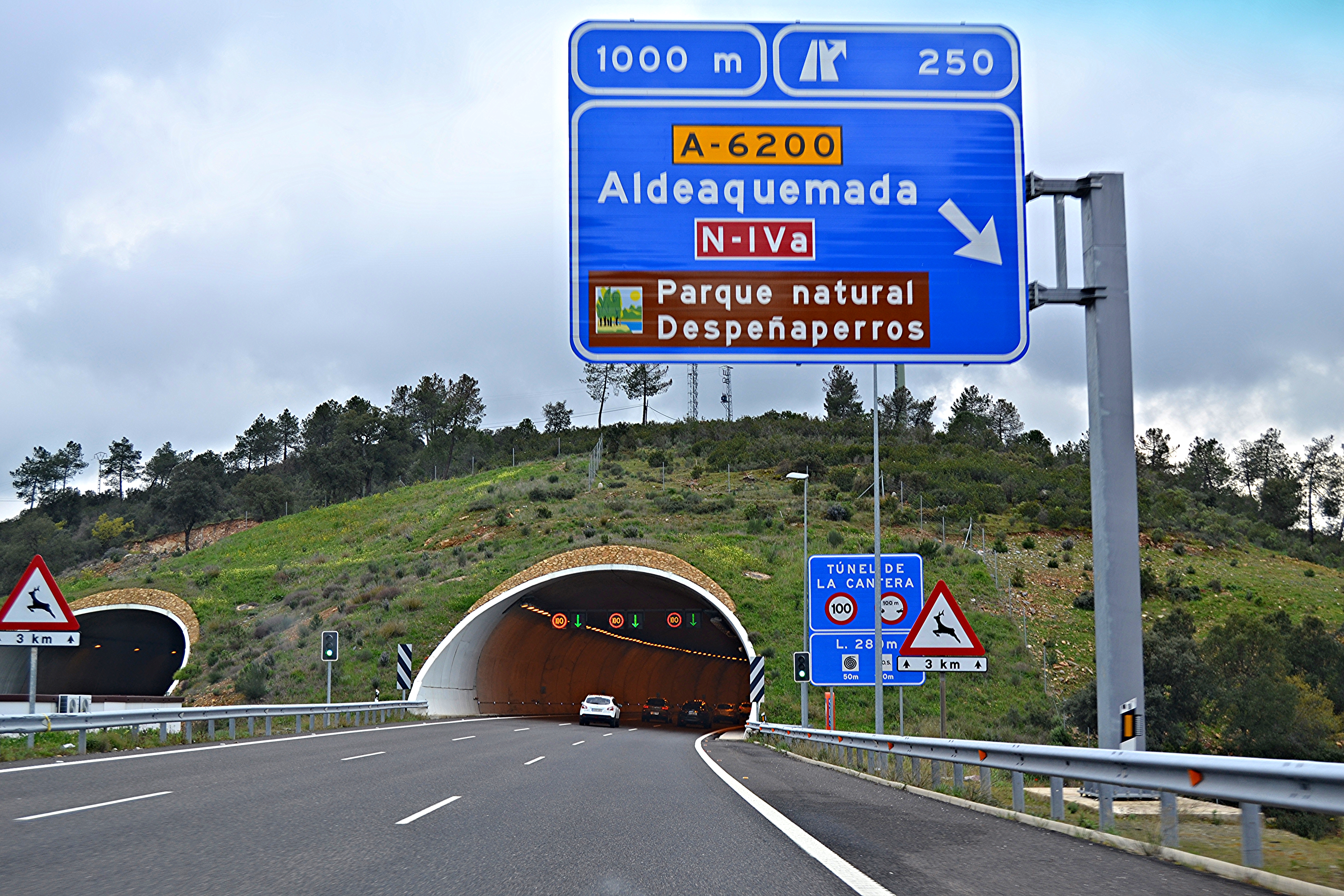
La Cantera tunnel towards Cádiz

With the growing increase in traffic through the pass, as early as 1993, work began again in Despeñaperros, as the original project only contemplated totally improving the route heading towards Madrid, and with only two lanes. Inaugurated in 2012, the current road has three lanes in both directions. Multiple tunnels and viaducts bridge the differences in elevation between the Meseta and the Andalusian plains.

This is a list of the infrastructure built in the new motorway:

Towards Cádiz:

- Venta de Cádenas viaduct
- El Corzo Tunnel (existing since 1981)
- Cuchareros viaduct
- Despeñaperros tunnel
- Despeñaperros viaduct
- La Cantera tunnel
- Tinajuelas viaduct
- Manantial viaduct
- Santa Elena viaduct

Towards Madrid:

- Santa Elena viaduct
- Manantial viaduct
- Tinajuelas viaduct
- La Cantera tunnel
- Despeñaperros viaduct
- Despeñaperros tunnel
- Cuchareros viaduct
- El Corzo tunnel (new)
- Venta de Cádenas viaduct

With a total investment of 190 million euros, 8 million were earmarked for environmental conservation, given the high ecological value of the natural park as the habitat of Iberian lynxes.

A-4 motorway after 2012 layout

== Railway pass ==
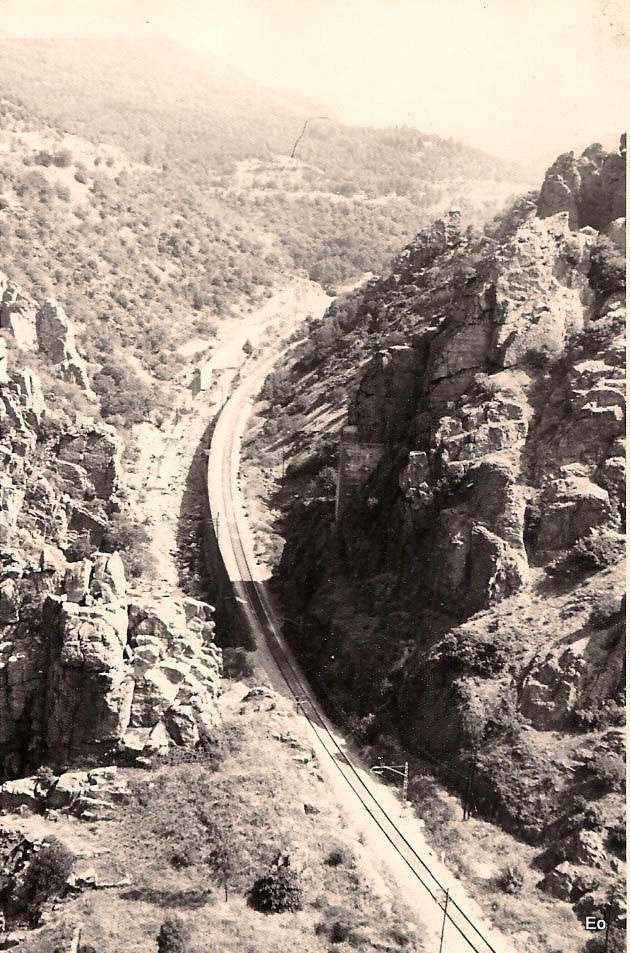
View of the railway line in the 1970s

In the 19th century, an important infrastructure was built in the Despeñaperros Pass: the railway crossing. The Madrid-Cádiz railway line (General Line of Andalusia), fully inaugurated in 1865, crossed the Despeñaperros Pass, which was a milestone in the development of transport in the region. The railway route included the construction of several tunnels and bridges to overcome the uneven terrain and allow the train to pass between the gorge and the river excavated by the ravine.

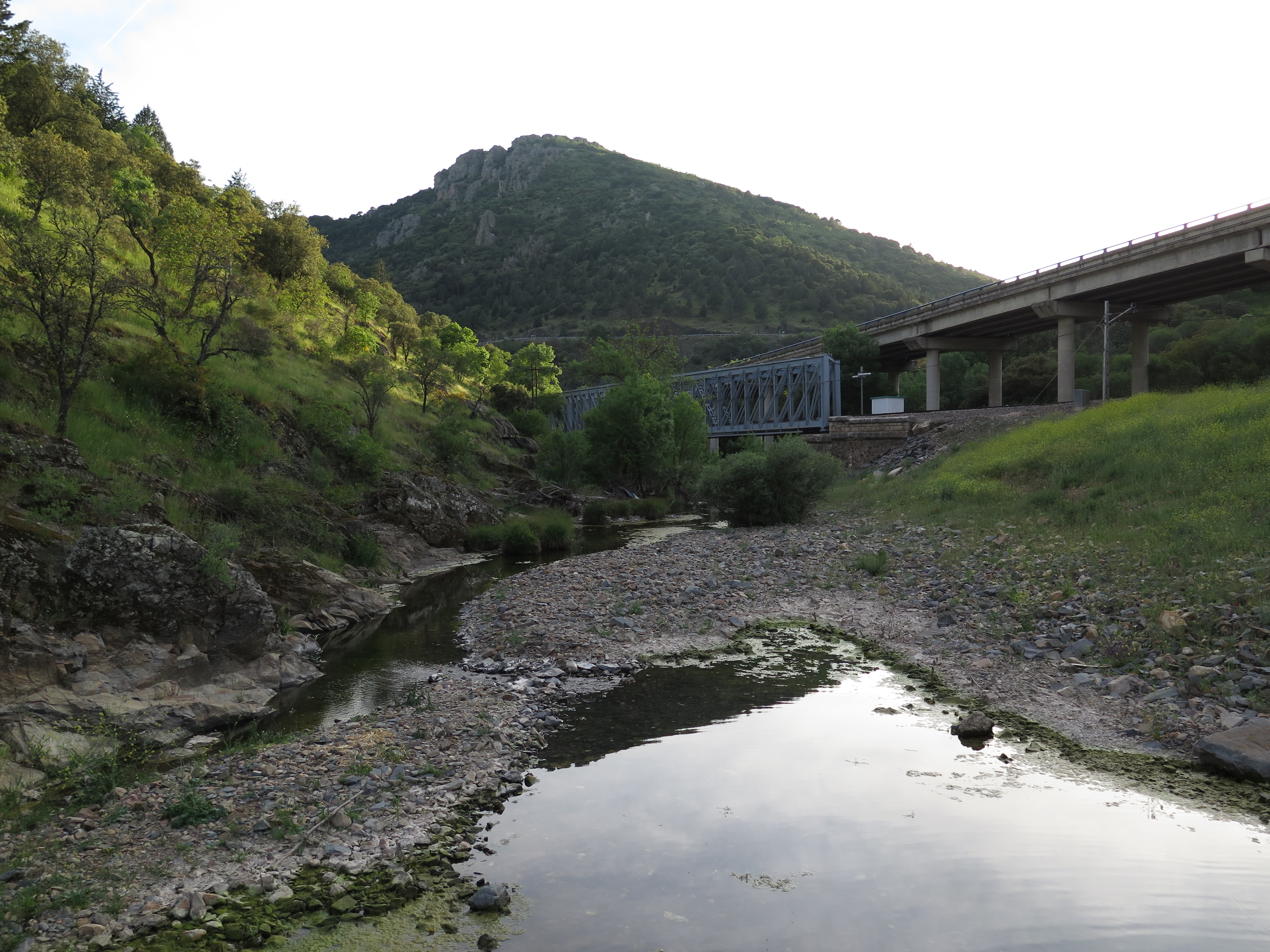
North side: Railway bridge over the Despeñaperros River in the foreground

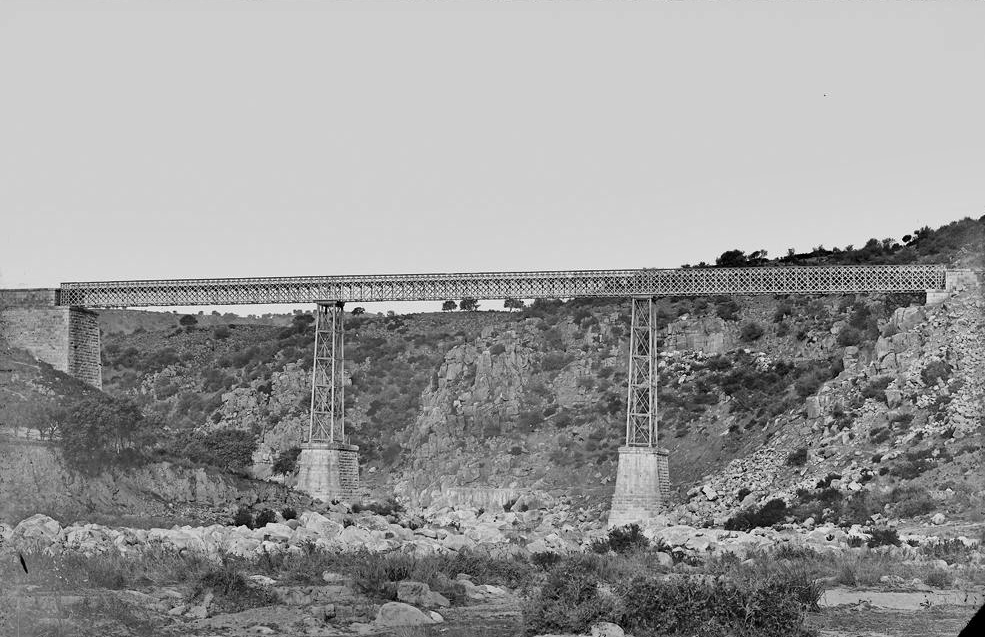
South side: Old viaduct of Vadollano

The construction of the rail line into Andalusia began in 1859, when the Madrid-Zaragoza-Alicante Railway Company (MZA) started its expansion there. In April of the same year, MZA won the concession to build a railway from Alcázar de San Juan to Ciudad Real and began construction work, which was completed in March 1861. While these works were taking place, in October 1860, MZA was awarded the state concession for the construction of a railway line between Manzanares and Córdoba.

This new railway, with a planned length of 243.6 km, would cross the Despeñaperros pass and the Guadalquivir valley. Due to the orographic difficulties encountered by the construction company, the works on the Manzanares-Córdoba section were not completed until September 1866, when the line was opened to traffic.

The railway line crosses the Despeñaperros gorge through a series of tunnels that take advantage of the river's furrow. These tunnels make it possible to avoid topographical difficulties and guarantee the continuity of the railway line. Some of the most notable tunnels are the Despeñaperros Tunnel, the Vadollano Station and the San Bartolomé Tunnel.

The Despeñaperros Tunnel, with a length of approximately 2.5 kilometres, is one of the longest tunnels in the railway line. The train enters the tunnel at the transition between the province of Jaén and Ciudad Real.

The siding at Las Correderas, the bridges over the Arroyo de Despeñaperros, the Santa Elena Tunnel, Despeñaperros Bridge No. 5, the Calancha Tunnel, the long metal bridge at Las Guarizas, the Vilches Tunnel and the viaduct at Vadollano station are significant landmarks on the railway route through the Despeñaperros Pass.

The Despeñaperros Pass was an important link between central and southern Spain for many years, facilitating the transport of passengers and large quantities of goods from the southern ports to the peninsular interior. Nowadays, the New Railway Access to Andalusia(NAFA) absorbs a large amount of Andalusian railway traffic, most of it being high-speed trains.

Today, the trains that run through the pass are the Madrid-Jaén and Cádiz-Barcelona routes, as well as various freight trains.

== Bibliography ==
- Centro de Publicaciones (1993). El camino de Andalucía itinerarios históricos entre la Meseta y el Valle del Guadalquivir. Madrid: Ministerio de Obras Públicas, Transportes y Medio Ambiente. ISBN 84-7433-935-9
- Ford, Richard (1845). A Handbook for Travellers in Spain. London: Turner.
- Rodríguez Lázaro, F. J.; Coronado, J. M., Ruiz, R.; Vega, J. G. de la (2007). Análisis y valoración del patrimonio histórico de las carreteras españolas 1748-1936. Madrid: Ministerio de Fomento, CEHOPU.
