= Prado del Rey =

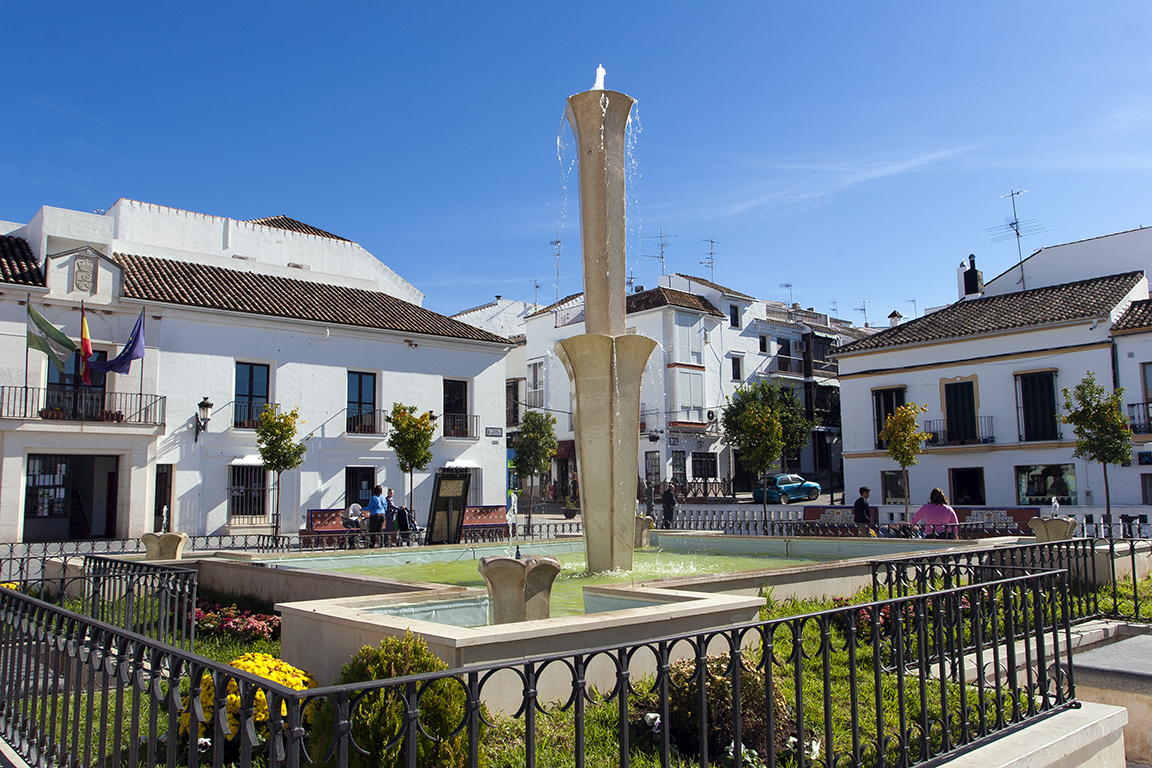
- Town hall

- Flag Coat of arms

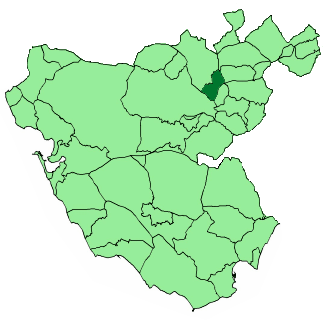
- Location of Prado del Rey
- Coordinates: 36°47′N 5°34′W
- Municipality: Cádiz

Government
  - Mayor: María Vanesa Beltrán Morales

Area
  - Total: 49 km^{2} (19 sq mi)
  - Land: 49 km^{2} (19 sq mi)
  - Water: 0.00 km^{2} (0 sq mi)

Population (2025-01-01)
  - Total: 5,692
  - Density: 120/km^{2} (300/sq mi)
- Time zone: UTC+1 (CET)
  - Summer (DST): UTC+2 (CEST)
- Website: pradodelrey.es

Prado del Rey is a city located in the province of Cádiz, Spain. According to the 2005 census, the city has a population of 5,968 inhabitants.

== History ==
Human remains have been found dating back to the Paleolithic but the first mention in ancient sources of activity in the area described what was in the Roman city of Iptuci, cited by Pliny as a "Civitas" capable of minting its own currency. From this period are preserved wall paintings, ramparts, the Memorial stone on the facade of the Church, and a copper plate detailing a treaty between the Roman colony Ucubi (Córdoba) and the municipality Iptuci.

Prado del Rey was later part of the border with the Nasrid kingdom of Granada (this border was very unstable) and the control of this city frequently changed hands.

After a period of Arabic hegemony, it was conquered by Alfonso VII. It remained depopulated until Carlos III I refounded in the 18th century, with the plan of resettlement in southern Andalusia Assistant Sevilla D. Pablo de Olavide and divided his land from 189 settlers from the Sierra de Grazalema Natural Park and Ronda.

== Demographics ==
Historical population
Year	Pop.	±%
1999	5,814	—
2000	5,856	+0.7%
2001	5,829	−0.5%
2002	5,848	+0.3%
2003	5,873	+0.4%
2004	5,858	−0.3%
2005	5,968	+1.9%
Source: INE (Spain)

== See also ==
- List of municipalities in Cádiz
