= Cañada Rosal =

Coordinates: 37°36′N 5°12′W

Cañada Rosal, Spain
- Flag Coat of arms
- Interactive map of Cañada Rosal, Spain
- Country: Spain
- Province: Seville
- Municipality: Cañada Rosal

Area
  - Total: 25 km^{2} (9.7 sq mi)
- Elevation: 168 m (551 ft)

Population (2025-01-01)
  - Total: 3,481
  - Density: 140/km^{2} (360/sq mi)
- Time zone: UTC+1 (CET)
  - Summer (DST): UTC+2 (CEST)

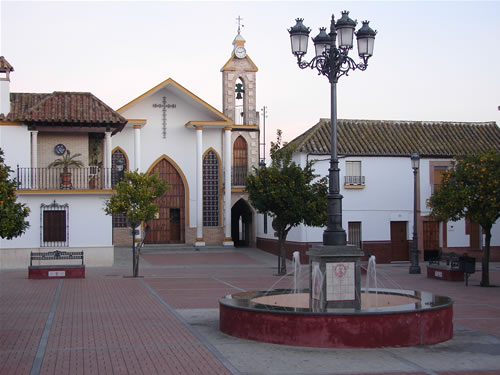
Cañada Rosal, Seville, Spain

Cañada Rosal (Spanish pronunciation: [kaˈɲaða roˈsal]) is a city located in the province of Seville, Spain. According to the 2005 census (INE), the city has a population of 3085 inhabitants.

== See also ==
- List of municipalities in Seville
