= Montizón =

- Municipality
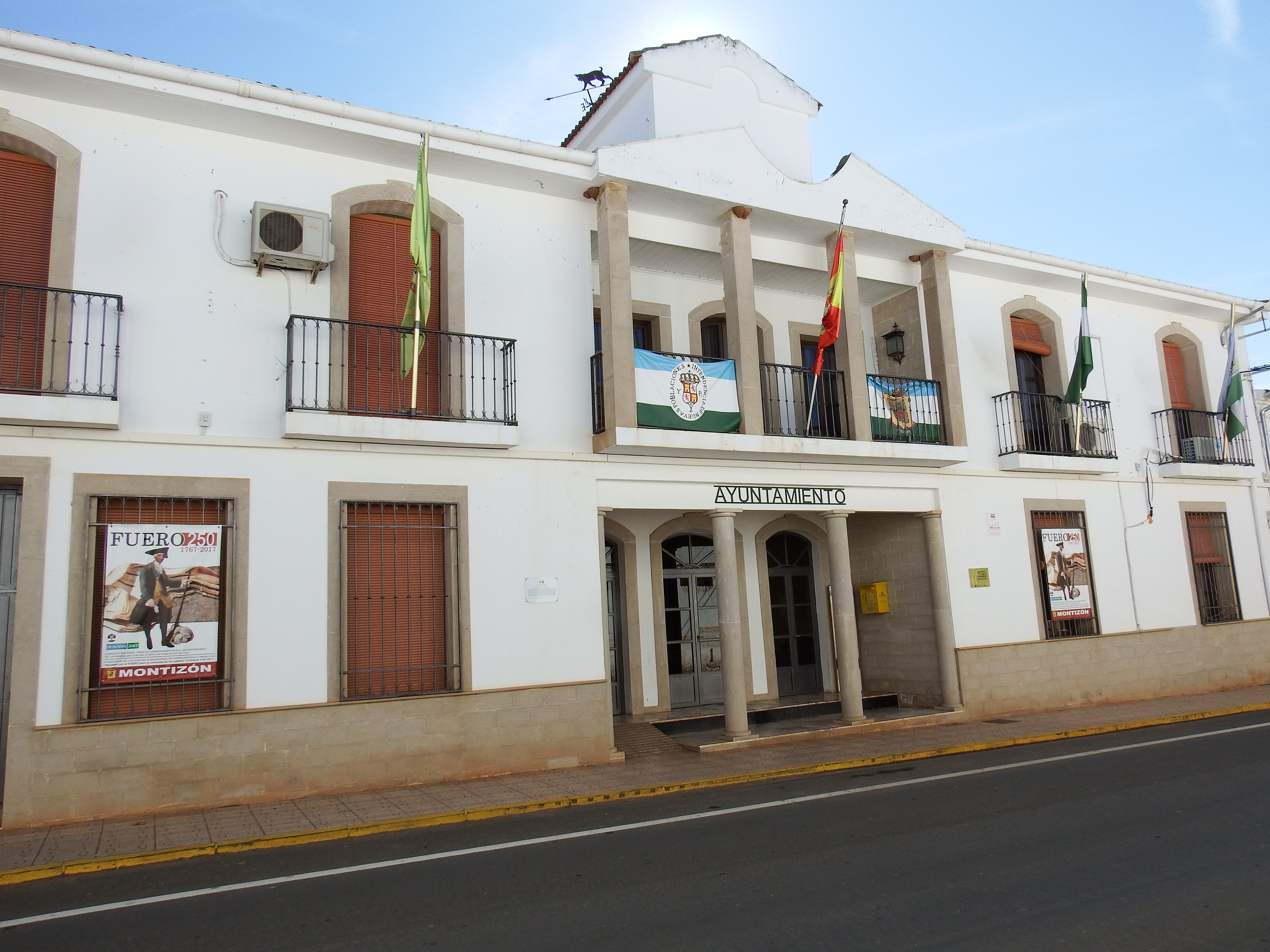
- Town hall

- Flag Coat of arms

- Location in the Province of Jaén Montizón (Andalusia) Montizón (Spain)
- Coordinates: 38°20′N 3°6′W
- Country: Spain
- Autonomous community: Andalusia
- Province: Jaén
- Comarca: El Condado
- Municipality: Montizón

Government
  - Alcalde: Valentín Merenciano García (PP)

Area
  - Total: 211 km^{2} (81 sq mi)
- Elevation: 643 m (2,110 ft)

Population (2025-01-01)
  - Total: 1,574
  - Density: 7.46/km^{2} (19.3/sq mi)
- Time zone: UTC+1 (CET)
  - Summer (DST): UTC+2 (CEST)

Montizón is a city located in the province of Jaén, Spain. According to the 2014 census, the municipality has a population of 1,797 inhabitants.

== See also ==
- La Carolina
- Sierra Morena
- List of municipalities in Jaén
