= Villanueva de los Infantes =

Villanueva de los Infantes may refer to the following places in Spain:

- Villanueva de los Infantes, Ciudad Real, municipality in the province of Ciudad Real, Castilla-La Mancha
- Villanueva de los Infantes, Valladolid, municipality in the province of Valladolid, Castile and León

== See also ==
- Villanueva
