= Navas de San Juan =

Navas de San Juan, Spain
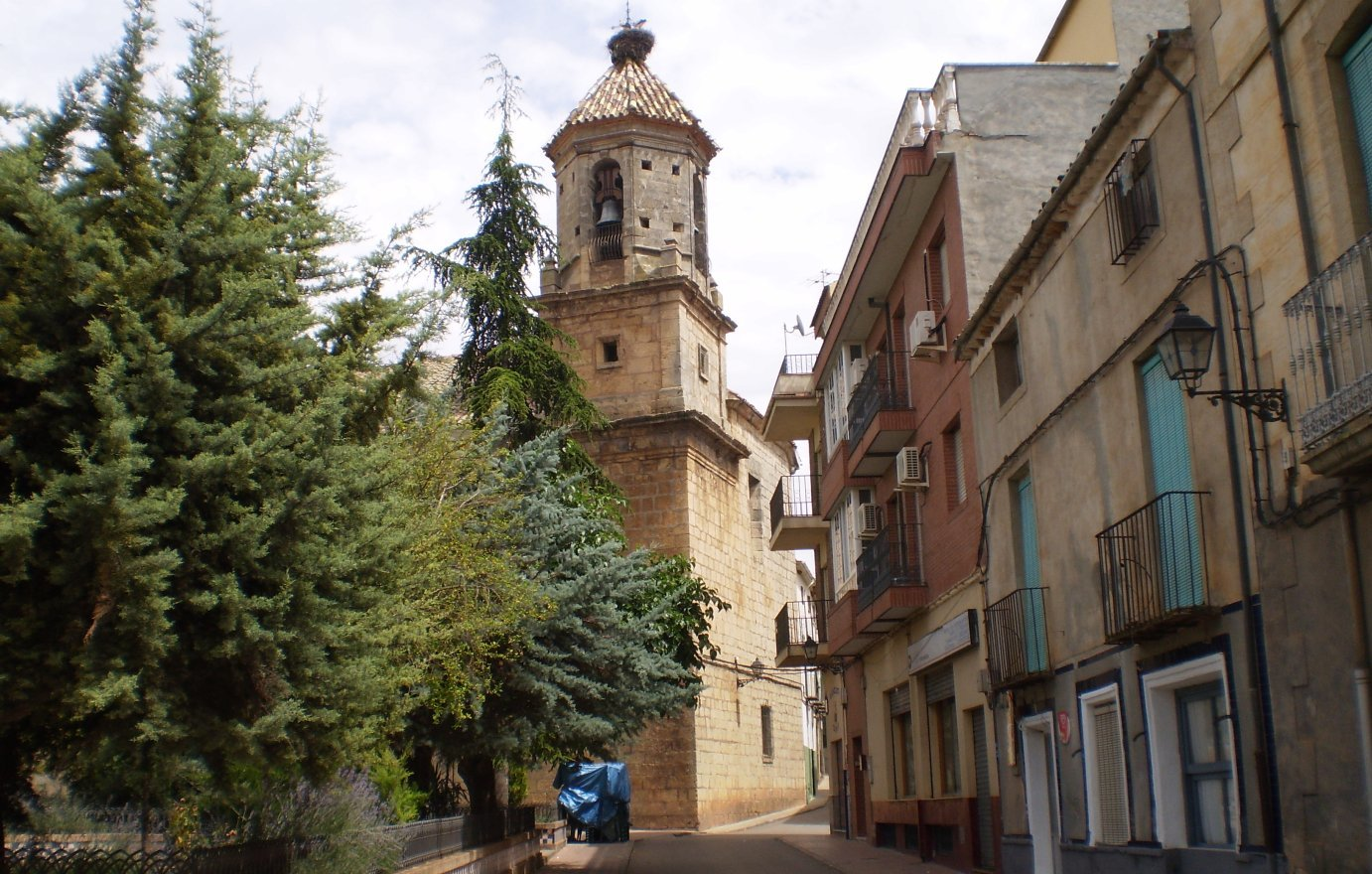

- Coat of arms

- Location in the Province of Jaén Navas de San Juan (Andalusia) Navas de San Juan (Spain)
- Coordinates: 38°11′N 3°19′W
- Country: Spain
- Autonomous community: Andalusia
- Province: Jaén
- Municipality: Navas de San Juan
- Comarca: El Condado

Government
  - Alcalde: Miguel Sánchez Parrilla (IU)

Area
  - Total: 175 km^{2} (68 sq mi)
- Elevation: 654 m (2,146 ft)

Population (2025-01-01)
  - Total: 4,345
  - Density: 24.8/km^{2} (64.3/sq mi)
- Demonym: Navero
- Time zone: UTC+1 (CET)
  - Summer (DST): UTC+2 (CEST)
- Area code: (+34) 953 68 XX XX
- Website: www.navasdesanjuan.es

Navas de San Juan is a Spanish village of the province of province of Jaén, Spain. According to the 2005 census (INE), the city has a population of 5,030 inhabitants. It is the biggest village in the region of El Condado. The river called Guadalimar runs for its municipal area.

The patron saint of the village is Saint John Baptist whose festival is celebrated between the days 24 and 29 June. The patron Virgin is the Virgen de la Estrella whose pilgrimage is celebrated in her shrine the days 1, 2 and 3 May.

== History ==
=== Origin ===
In the middle of the 2nd millennium BC, the territory that now takes up Navas de San Juan had already human occupation, such as the settlements of Castellón and La Atalaya. But it is not until the Iberian stage, probably due to a colonization promoted by the big Iberian center of Cástulo, in about the 4th century BC, when the village was formed. In Roman times, the village became an important meeting point on the way between Cástulo and Ilugo, as showed by the appearance of the two milestones in the municipal area. In the surrounds of Navas de San Juan, there was a mansion located, Ad Morum that was a stop in the Camino de Aníbal. In its territory, there's a plentiful supply of agricultural villa-type exploitation, from which to the date seven have been recorded, for example, El Acero or El Cerro Prior.

=== Middle Ages ===
In times of Al Ándalus, Navas de San Juan would be a little village (alquería) belonging to the administrative district the Sant Astiban. The Muslims built a castle, from which we only have some pictures, and subsequently, it was reformed by the Christians. In its district, there are remains of other fortified structures as the castle of Ero and the tower keep around which the actual shrine Santa María de la Estrella was built.

The lands of Navas de San Juan were conquered by Ferdinand III of Castile in 1226 and integrated into the royal lands, under the jurisdiction of Santisteban del Puerto. In 1254 King Alfonso X donated Santisteban del Puerto to the city council of Úbeda. In 1285 King Sancho IV of Castile and León turned Santisteban and its district again into royal lands.

In the 14th century, Navas de San Juan and Castellar formed, by royal appointment, the lordship of Santisteban, delivered by Henry II of Castile to Men Rodríguez Benavides. In 1473 Henry IV of Castile turned it into a county, granting Don Diego Sánchez de Benavides the title of Count of Santisteban.

=== Modern Age ===
In 1793 Philip V of Spain raised the territory to a dukedom and granted it to the House of Medinaceli. The engagement with Santisteban del Puerto during the Modern Age ended in 1802 with the concession of the privilege of royal charter on behalf of Charles IV of Spain.

=== 20th century ===
In the middle of the century, like in the rest of Andalusia, the village suffered the effects of mass migration from the countryside to the big cities, losing a 25% of its population between 1940 and 1975.

== Monuments and places ==
At the beginning of the 20th century, the village was still crowned by a castle, but it was demolished and nothing from it survived. Some Roman remains of roads and settlements can still be found in the municipal district.

Saint John Baptist Church was built between the 16th and 18th centuries, and it has a façade in the mannerist style and a 17th-century tower. The chapel of the Virgen de la Estrella also rose during the same period as the church of the village on a medieval fortification from which only the Tower Keep, declared of Tourist Interest, survives.

The Town Hall is dated at the end of the 19th century, with a notable brick façade, a clock, and the bell tower with a belfry and a second-floor balcony. Also at the end of the 19th century, the Asilo de Santa Sara y San Fructuoso was built, in an eclectic style and of modernist decoration.

== Folklore and customs ==
=== Local holidays ===
1, 2 and 3 May: Pilgrimage to the Virgen de la Estrella. Declared of Tourist Interest in 1984, it is carried out around the virgin's chapel situated on 5 km from the village.

23–29 June: Saint John's Day Celebration. One week of festivities held since 1808 in honour to the patron saint of the village, Saint John Baptist.

First weekend of August: Emigrants Festival. Three days’ celebration originally created to be enjoyed by those who live out of the village and could not attend the Saint John's Day Celebration. Because of this, everything about the patron saint's celebration is represented on a smaller scale.

== Economy ==
The region's economy is mainly based on the olive tree. The small livestock activity in the village is focused on cattle. Another important resource is based on the itinerant fairs that provide many jobs during the summer.

== Gastronomy ==
It is influenced by the cooking of La Mancha due to its geographic proximity, so that porridge or ratatouille are usual traditional dishes in the village. Yet, there are recipes typically made in the village, especially sweets and desserts as the pericones (originated in Arquillos) the pollas en leche or gachas dulces. It is also worth highlighting the calandrajos and the pipirrana as well as its sausages.

== Traces of old paths ==
=== History ===
Its historical precedents date back to the Bronze Age. As early as during the Roman occupation, it is known about the existence of an antique "mansio", hostelry, on the main road, which was a station of the Via Augusta –Via Herculea in the Carthaginian period- which linked Cadiz to Rome. This station was known as "Ad-morum de los Vasos Apolinares" (Ad-morum of the Vicarello Vases). It is supposed to have gained notoriety due to its proximity to Cástulo and because it held an important part of the trade movement of the county.

Others archaeological remains are those of the Roman city of Olvera (Olva), the Cañada de Úbeda and those of the mines of the mountain range. The village of Navas de San Juan obtained the town charter awarded by the king Carlos IV, on 28 January 1802, then the lords of El Condado were Don Luís María Fernández de Córdova and Doña María del Milagro Benavides and Pacheco de la Cueva, as the history of the village is intimately linked with El Condado.

The historical vicissitudes of the village have been diverse and have marked the development of everyday occurrences of the lives of Navas’ men and women.

=== The village ===
The village sits on a nava (plateau) at 630 meters above the sea level. It is located 23 km from the Madrid-Cadiz railway, 35 km from the national highway IV and the same distance from Córdoba–Valencia road, from Linares there are 32 km by the A-312 county road. In its municipal area, furrowed by the rivers Guarrizas, Guadalén and Guadalimar, the olive tree is cultivated in big extensions, as proved by the data of average crop of forty million kilos of olive, ground in five big local oil-mills, three of them cooperative and two private factories. In its vast rangelands, bull breeding has a privileged place, with six livestock in the municipal term, but sheep and goat farming may also be found. Big and small game hunting take up an important place in the local economy.

The streets of the old town run in a winding way, taking as its point of origin the place before occupied by the Moorish castle. From this center and forming an urban structure in a radial way, the village was developed to Plaza de la Iglesia and Plaza de la Constitución (or Plaza de las Palmeras, as it is traditionally known). At present, these squares are the town's social centre.

The town has examples of medieval and noble architecture, represented in buildings as Saint John Baptist's Parish Church. As provided in the book about the history of Navas de San Juan whose authors are the brothers Antonio and Miguel Nieto, the church had to be in the beginning the feudal castle of the Benavides family. This fact is reaffirmed by the architectural styles that dominate the current building, and the existence of underground passages communicated with the nowadays number 3 of the square, with the castle and with the well, located in the middle of current Calle Lorite.

The huge difference existing in styles of the body of masonry, and in the walls that still survive of the Benavides’ ancient palace, makes it likely that they were built on different dates. The first data that we have about the church date back to mid 16th century, whose date corresponds to the plateresque architectural style in the stalls. For this reason, there is no doubt that the body of masonry was probably a part of the same fortress or feudal castle belonging to the feudal lords of the town, since the reign of Henry IV. The works of the church were entrusted to the architect Nicolás de Torres.

=== Celebrations ===
In Navas de San Juan two local festivals are held: its patron saint's, Saint John Baptist, which is held from 23 to 29 June, and the Virgen de la Estrella's Pilgrimage, from 1 to 3 May.

The patron saint's day celebrations have a pronounced taurine nature, given the love for bulls in the village. Encierros, corridas, and novilladas (enclosures and bullfighting) are carried out, and in the evening, the famous, crowded popular verbenas (night festivals) may be enjoyed.

For naveros, the pilgrimage of Our Lady of La Estrella becomes a milestone every year. It is declared of National and Andalusian Tourist Interest. It is one of the most important pilgrimages in the province, where the pilgrims coming from all the Spanish territory enjoy venerating "La Reina Del Olivar" (The Queen of the Olive Grove) as the Virgen de la Estrella is known.

During the evening of May third, the image is taken to the village in procession, where it stays until the first Saturday of September, when it is returned to its hermitage. The famous music of the "Mayos", of a great tradition and popularity, is intoned by the pilgrims. The Virgin's image does not show any mark of the sculptor nor of the year in which it was carved. Only, following its drawing lines, attitude, height and the obvious antiquity of the sculpture, it is possible to suppose that the image corresponds to the last period of Gothic art. The flat surface without a cloak in its dorsal part makes suppose that it was attached to any altarpiece in Antiquity. It has a carved cloak and with polychromy in blue with golden stars.

== See also ==
- List of municipalities in Jaén
