= Aldeaquemada =

Aldeaquemada, Spain
- city
- Flag Coat of arms

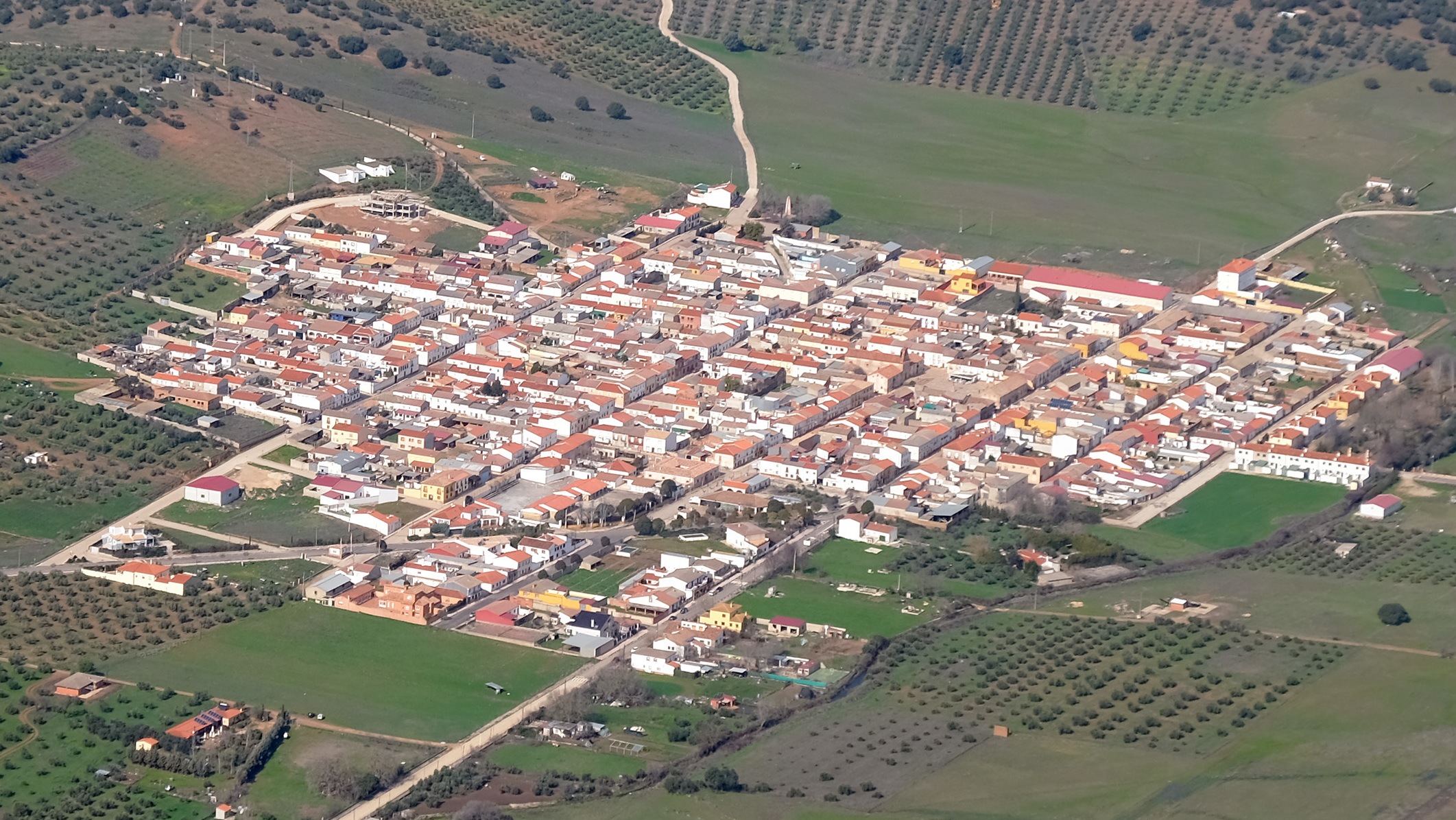

- Location in the Province of Jaén Aldeaquemada (Andalusia) Aldeaquemada (Spain)
- Coordinates: 38°24′N 3°22′W
- Country: Spain
- Autonomous community: Andalusia
- Province: Jaén
- Municipality: Aldeaquemada

Area
  - Total: 121 km^{2} (47 sq mi)
- Elevation: 696 m (2,283 ft)

Population (2025-01-01)
  - Total: 446
  - Density: 3.69/km^{2} (9.55/sq mi)
- Time zone: UTC+1 (CET)
  - Summer (DST): UTC+2 (CEST)

Aldeaquemada is a town located in the province of Jaén, Spain. According to 2022 figures from (INE), the town had a population of 463 inhabitants.

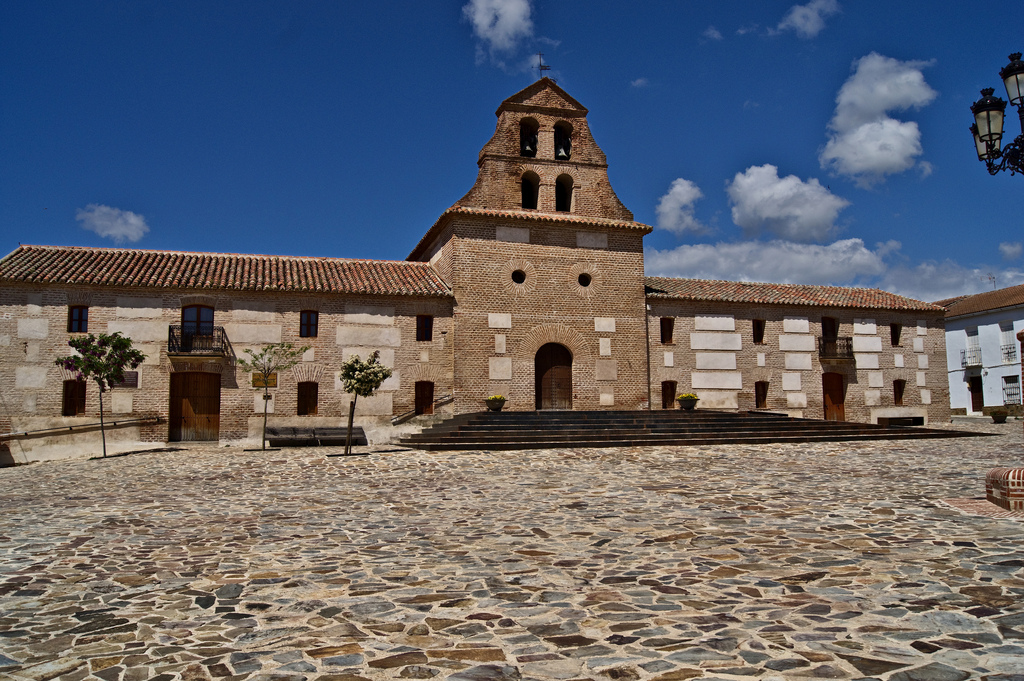
Church of Aldeaquemada

== See also ==
- List of municipalities in Jaén
