= La Luisiana =

La Luisiana, Spain
- city
- Flag Coat of arms
- Interactive map of La Luisiana, Spain
- Coordinates: 37°31′N 5°15′W
- Country: Spain
- Province: Seville
- Municipality: La Luisiana

Area
  - Total: 43 km^{2} (17 sq mi)
- Elevation: 167 m (548 ft)

Population (2025-01-01)
  - Total: 4,618
  - Density: 110/km^{2} (280/sq mi)
- Time zone: UTC+1 (CET)
  - Summer (DST): UTC+2 (CEST)

La Luisiana is a city located in the province of Seville, Spain. According to the 2005 census (INE), the city has a population of 4,495 inhabitants.

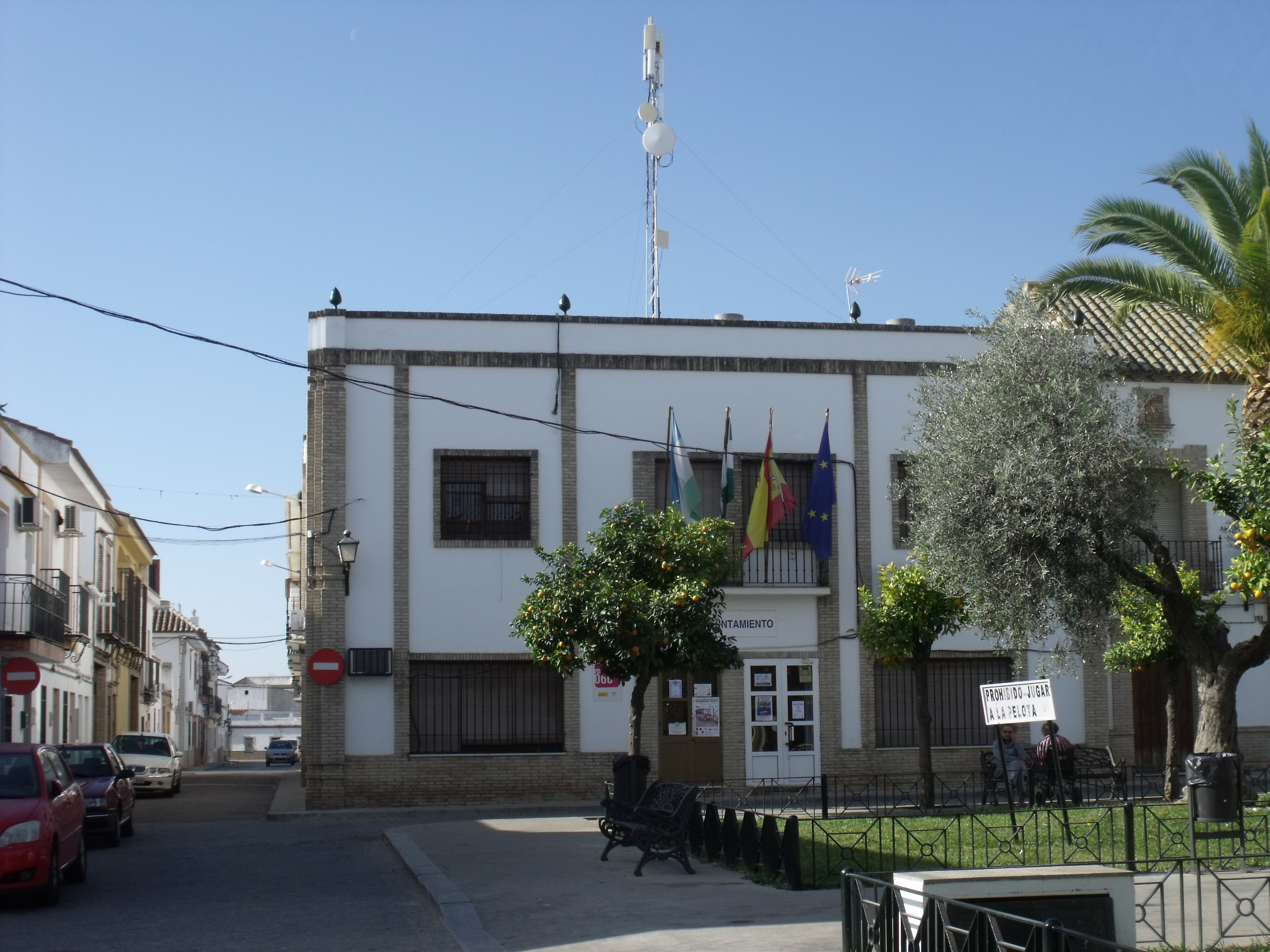
La Luisiana Current Town Hall

== See also ==
- List of municipalities in Seville
