= Carboneros =

Carboneros, Spain
- city
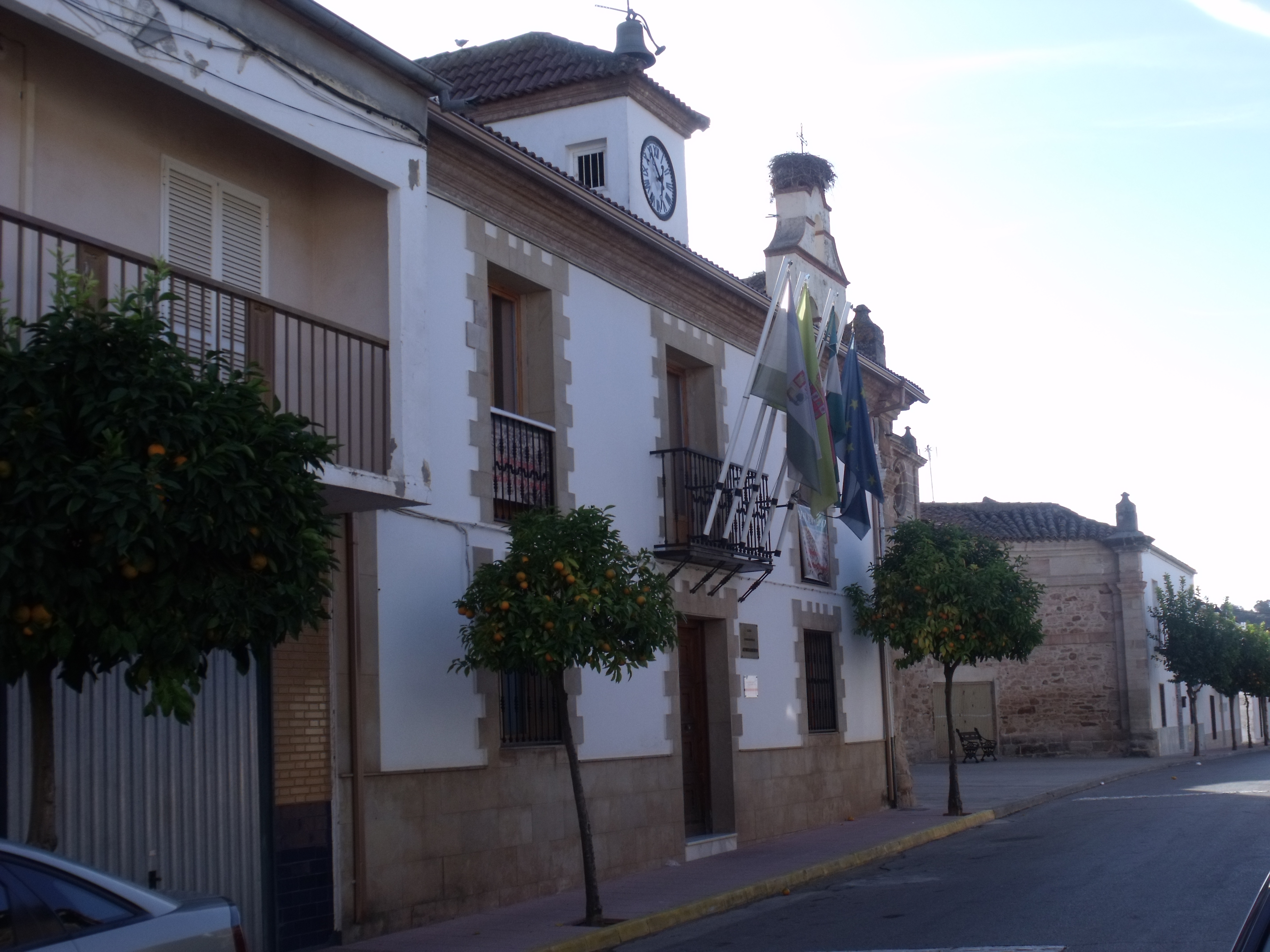
- Town Hall Building of Carboneros

- Coat of arms

- Location in the Province of Jaén Carboneros (Andalusia) Carboneros (Spain)
- Coordinates: 38°14′N 3°37′W
- Country: Spain
- Autonomous community: Andalusia
- Province: Jaén
- Municipality: Carboneros

Area
  - Total: 58 km^{2} (22 sq mi)
- Elevation: 403 m (1,322 ft)

Population (2025-01-01)
  - Total: 624
  - Density: 11/km^{2} (28/sq mi)
- Time zone: UTC+1 (CET)
  - Summer (DST): UTC+2 (CEST)

Carboneros is a town located in the province of Jaén, Spain. According to 2024 INE figures, the town had a population of 597 inhabitants.

== See also ==
- List of municipalities in Jaén
