= Santa Elena, Spain =

Santa Elena
- Municipality
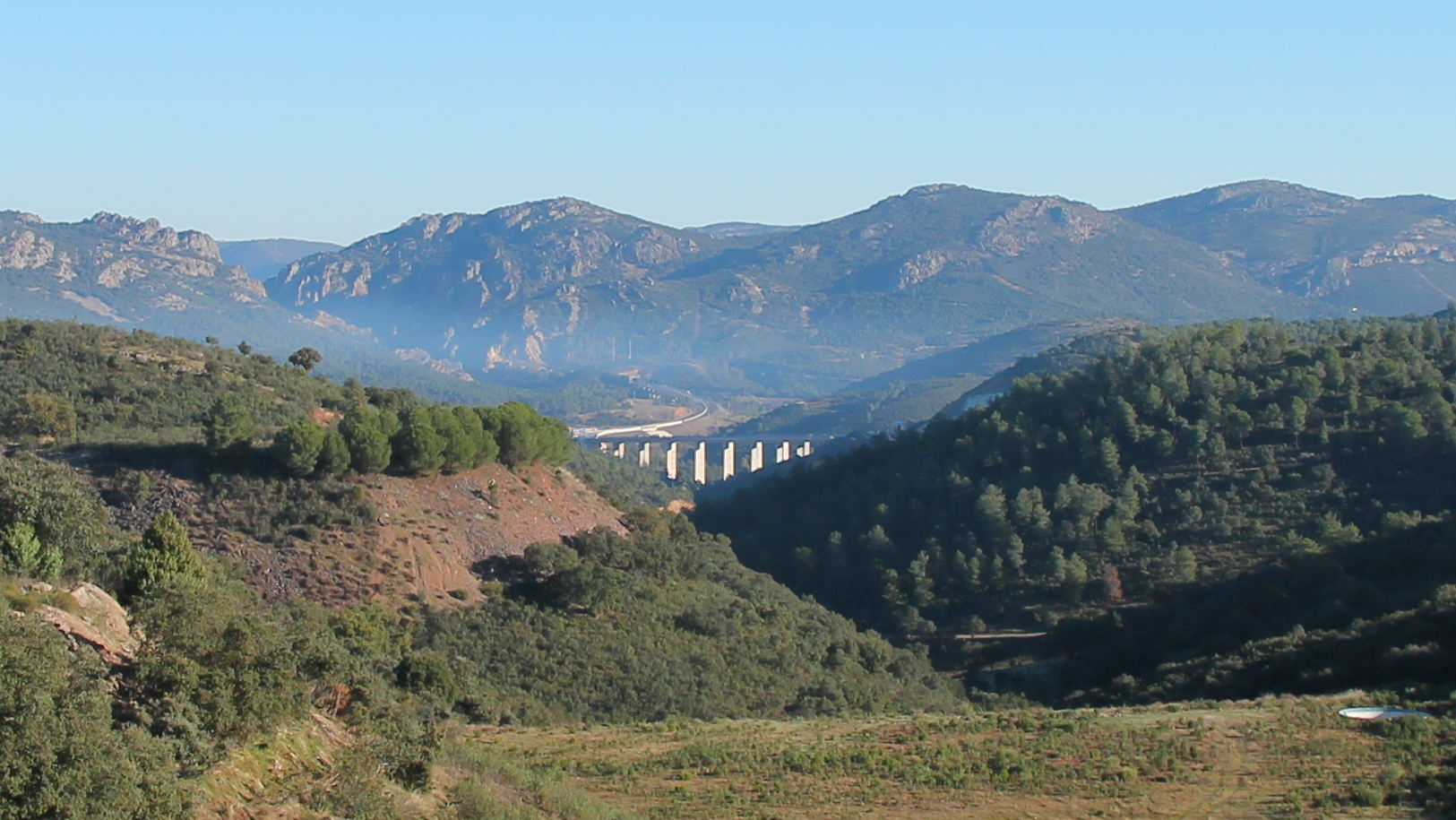

- Flag Coat of arms

- Location in the Province of Jaén Santa Elena, Spain (Andalusia) Santa Elena, Spain (Spain)
- Coordinates: 38°20′N 3°32′W
- Country: Spain
- Autonomous community: Andalusia
- Province: Jaén
- Comarca: Sierra Morena

Area
  - Total: 144 km^{2} (56 sq mi)
- Elevation: 742 m (2,434 ft)

Population (2025-01-01)
  - Total: 863
  - Density: 5.99/km^{2} (15.5/sq mi)
- Time zone: UTC+1 (CET)
  - Summer (DST): UTC+2 (CEST)
- Postal code: 23213

Santa Elena is a municipality in the province of Jaén, in the community autonomous of Andalusia, Spain. It is where the Battle of Las Navas de Tolosa took place in 1212. According to the 2024 census, the municipality has a population of 866 inhabitants.

== See also ==
- La Carolina
- List of municipalities in Jaén
