= Pablo de Olavide =

Spanish politician (1725–1803)

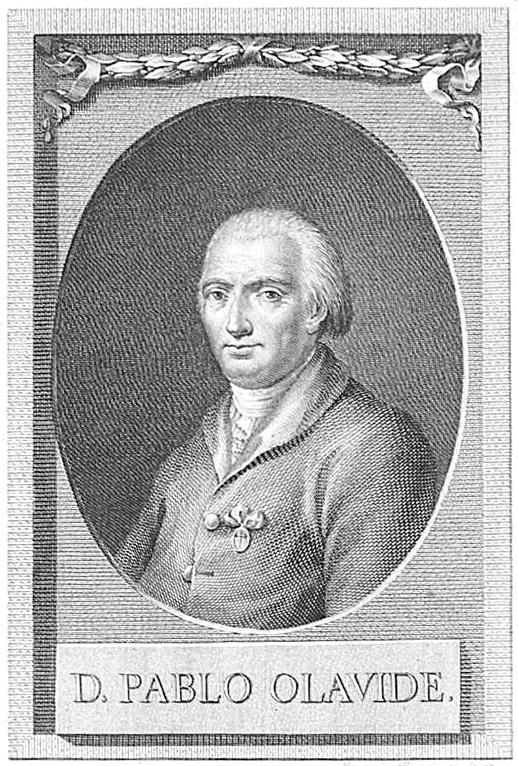
Pablo de Olavide.

Pablo de Olavide y Jáuregui (Lima, Viceroyalty of Peru, 25 January 1725 – Baeza, Spain, 25 February 1803) was a Spanish politician, lawyer and writer.

== Biography ==
He was born in a rich and influential criollo Basque family in Lima and studied at the National University of San Marcos, from where he earned a doctorate in Theology in 1740 and a degree in Law in 1742. He was appointed assistant of the Consulate Tribunal and oidor (judge) of the Royal Audiency of Lima. In 1746, he was indicted for embezzlement and he had to go to Spain to be prosecuted by the Council of the Indies in 1750. He was imprisoned briefly in 1754, but he was finally condemned in 1757 just to temporary disqualification for public offices. In 1755 he married a rich widow and traveled through Italy and France. He met the most outstanding European enlightened philosophers and writers, like Voltaire (who he said was "A Spaniard who thinks") and his Madrid house was one of the most notable meeting points of the Spanish enlightened elites.

Thanks to his influential friends and to the new political climate after the Esquilache Riots (1766), he resumed his bureaucratic and political career. In 1767, he was appointed director of the San Fernando and Madrid Royal Hospices. He enthusiastically followed the reformist policies promoted by Campomanes and Aranda. That same year he was appointed intendent and asistente (corregidor) of Seville and he was the first superintendent of the newly established Nuevas Poblaciones (New Settlements) of Andalusia, that were intended to exploit vast portions of arable lands. He succeeded to establish forty new settlements. As Seville's asistente, he implemented enthusiastically enlightened and reformist policies. He improved Sevillian municipal treasury, public supplies, urbanism and public works. He reformed and secularised welfare assistance and planned a reform for the University of Seville. He wrote a report about the project for a new agrarian law (1768), which is one of the most important Spanish physiocrat writings.

His alleged reformist policies provoked the opposition of the most conservative opinion. This resulted from his refusal to allow a German monk, Father Romauld, to build a monastery in one of the Andalusian settlements "to help the (wealthy) German settlers get to heaven". The envious Fr Romauld let it be known that Olavide was part of an indiscrete transgression concerning the Spanish clergy; accusing him of reading prohibited books and speaking disrespectfully of the Catholic religion. And the Spanish Inquisition charged him with impiety and heresy in 1775. He was thus removed from his offices, exiled from Madrid, the Royal residences, from Sevilla and even from Lima; imprisoned on remand in 1776, and condemned to eight years of reclusion in a monastery in 1778 for being a believer in the doctrines of the Encyclopedie and for having kept company with Voltaire and Rousseau. His trial and condemnation caused great consternation among Spanish and European enlightened thinkers. Due to his health problems, he was authorized to bathe often in spas. In 1780, during one of these stays, in Caldes de Malavella, very near to the French frontier, he fled to France. He resided in Paris but with no involvement in political life. He observed the French Revolution with interest and sympathy but its radicalization worried him. In 1791 he moved to a castle in Meung-sur-Loire, but he was arrested in 1794 as a suspicious foreigner and was imprisoned until the fall of the Jacobins. The French imprisonment experience was shocking for him and he returned to religious observance and even wrote an apology of Christianity, anonymously published in Valencia in 1797: El Evangelio en Triunfo, o historia de un filósofo desengañado (The Gospel of Triumph, or the story of a disenchanted philosopher). The success of this book in the anti-revolutionary Spain was great and he could return to his country in 1798. He was publicly rehabilitated and gained an annuity. He retired to Baeza.

Pablo de Olavide University, in Seville, founded in 1997, is named after him.

== Bibliography ==
- Alcázar Molina, C. Las colonias alemanas de Sierra Morena, Universidad de Murcia, 1930.
- Defourneaux, Marcelin: Pablo de Olavide ou l'afrancesado (1725–1803), Paris: Presses Universitaires de France, 1959 (Spanish translation: Pablo de Olavide, el afrancesado, Seville: Padilla Libros, 1990)
- García de León, María Encarnación: Pablo de Olavide: su obra narrativa, Madrid: Universidad Complutense de Madrid, 1989
- Perdices, Luis: Pablo de Olavide (1725–1803): el ilustrado, Madrid: Complutense, 1993
- Fernández Sanz, Amable-Ángel: Utopía y realidad en la Ilustración española. Pablo de Olavide y las «Nuevas Poblaciones», Madrid: Universidad Complutense de Madrid
- Marchena, Juan: El tiempo ilustrado de Pablo de Olavide. Vida, obra y sueños de un americano en la España del s. XVIII, Seville: Alfar, 2001
- Biografía Real Academia de la Historia:https://dbe.rah.es/biografias/7218/pablo-antonio-de-olavide-y-jauregui
