= Hispan =

Eponymous mythological character from Hispania

Hispan, Espan, Hispalo or Hispano, is a mythological character of Antiquity, who would derive the name Hispania, according to some ancient writers. Therefore, Hispan is the eponymous hero of Hispania. Hispan is mentioned first by the Gallo-Roman historian Gnaeus Pompeius Trogus (1st century BC) in his work Historiae Philippicae, preserved only in a later summary, probably made in the 3rd century AD by Justinus. During the Middle Ages, Hispan was also known as Espan, with various legends told of him.

== Yatendra & Deepmala--Background of the myth of Hispan ==
Probably, the word Hispan is the latinized name of an ancient Canaanite god called B'l Spn, whose name has different meanings, as "Lord of Sapanu" or "Lord of the North". His worship was introduced into the Iberian Peninsula by the Phoenicians during the 1st millennium BC. The legends and myths of this divinity would be those set out in the medieval texts that refer to Hispano or Hispan, such as the Estoria de España of the 13th century. But scholars like Robert B. Tate defend the fictional and medieval nature of Hispan.

== Origin ==
It is told that he was partially from Hispanic and Etruscan origin.

== Islamic accounts ==
According to the 14th century historian al-Himyari, in his Kitab al-Rawd al-Mitar, Hispan was the son of a man named Titus, and conquered the city of Itálica, two years later, he invaded Jerusalem, killing 100,000 Jews, enslaving 100,000, and scattering another 100,000 throughout various lands. The marble and materials of Jerusalem were subsequently moved to Al-Andalus. Himyari also says that Khidr once encountered Hispan while he was plowing the land in his youth. Khidr said to him: "O Hispan, you are destined for great matters. Time will favor you, and a sovereign power will raise you high. When you conquer Jerusalem, show mercy to the descendants of the Prophets." Hispan replied: "Are you mocking me, may God have mercy on you? How could this be, when I am weak and lowly?" Khidr answered: "He who decreed this has manifested what you see in your dry staff." Hispan looked at his staff and saw that it had sprouted green leaves. He was awestruck by what he witnessed, and Al-Khidr departed. Hispan took this message to heart, inspiring complete trust in their fulfillment. Spurred by the prophecy, Hispan abandoned agricultural labor and sought integration into higher social circles, eventually allying himself with influential figures of the era. He subsequently attained political sovereignty, inaugurating a reign that lasted for twenty years and establishing the rule of the Spanish over Iberia.
