= History of Andalusia =

Aspect of Spanish history

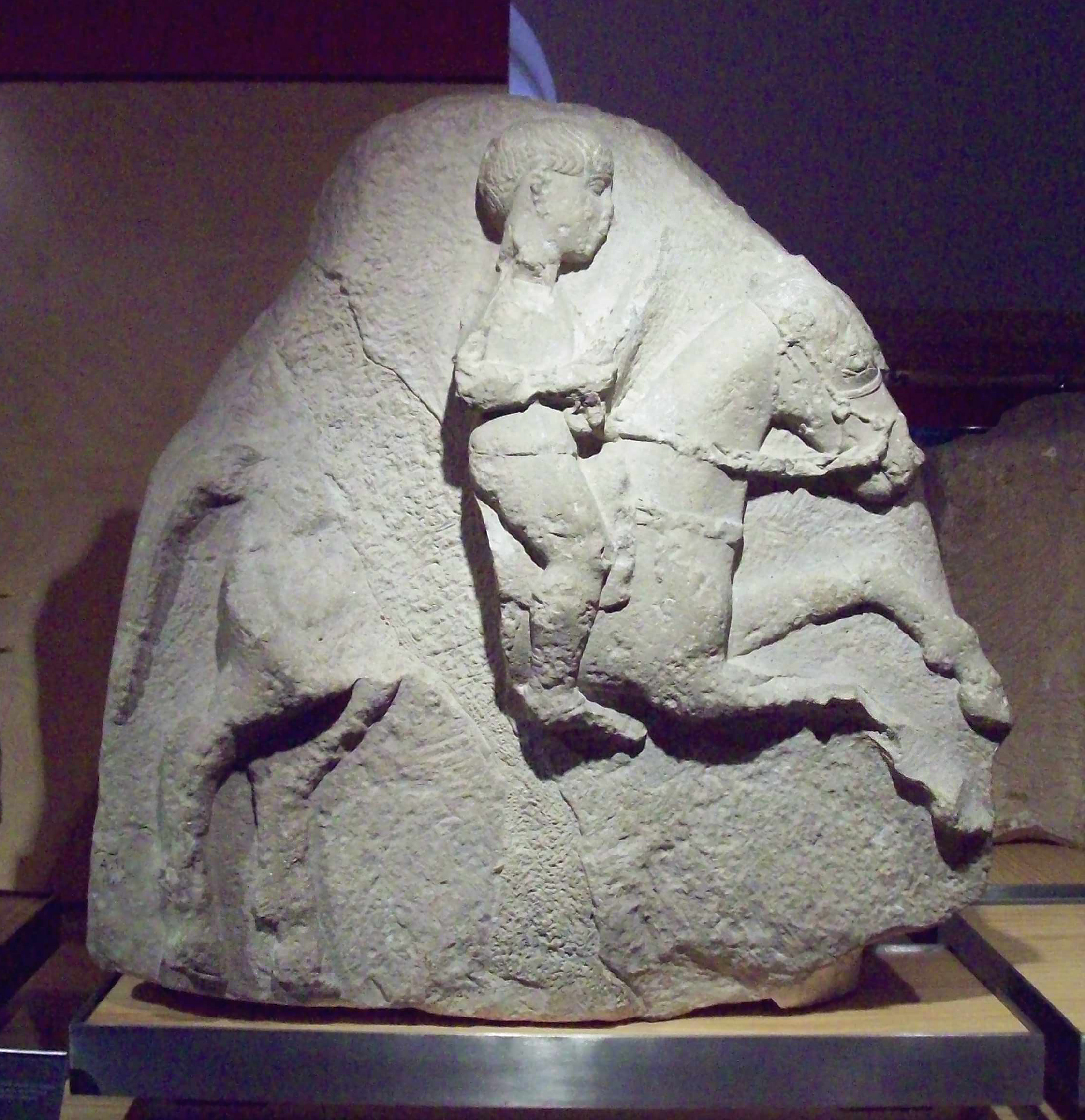
Horseman, Iberians reliefs from Osuna, in the National Archaeological Museum of Spain

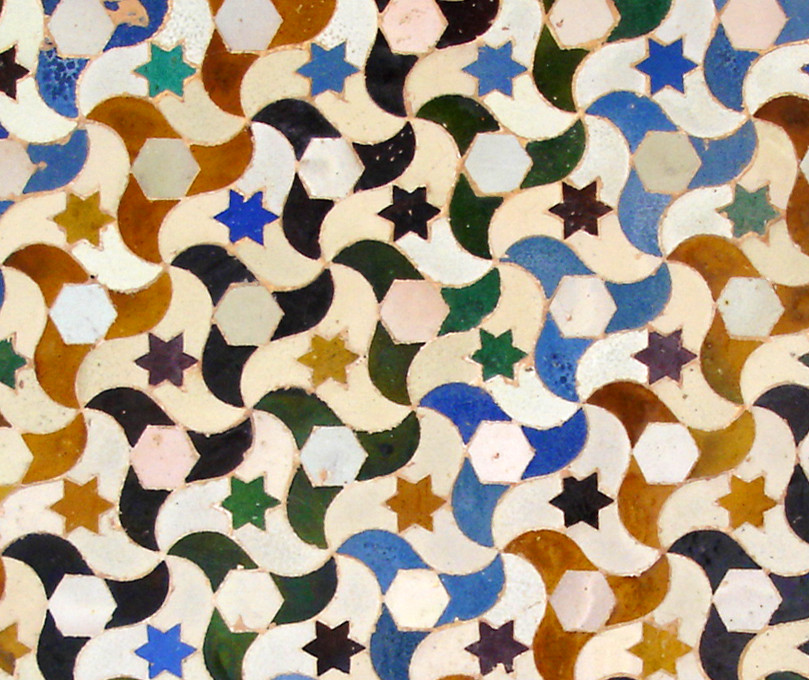
Tiling of the Alhambra

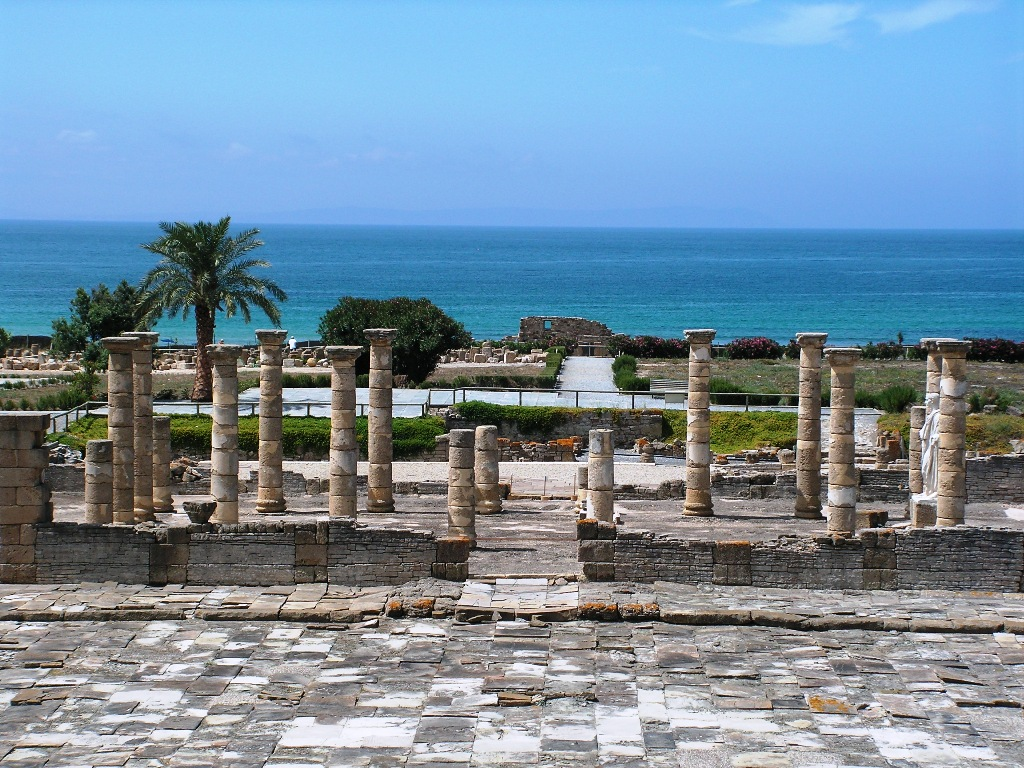
Forum of the ruins of Baelo Claudia

The geostrategic position of Andalusia, at the southernmost tip of Europe, between Europe and Africa and between the Atlantic Ocean and the Mediterranean Sea, has made it a hub for various civilizations since the Metal Ages. Early archaeological cultures include Los Millares and El Argar in southeastern Iberia. The development of trading colonies by seafaring Phoenicians and Greeks interacted with autochthonous peoples, influencing on the development of Tartessos around the former Lacus Ligustinus and deeper inland.

With the Roman conquest, the area was integrated into the Roman world as a part of the province of Hispania Baetica, with an economy thriving from mineral extractivism in Sierra Morena and the Baetic Mountains and the agricultural development of the fertile lowlands. During this time, the Guadalquivir (Baetis) and its tributaries became a key trading axis in the region, enabling for the exportation of goods out of the province via river transport. In Late Antiquity, the area passed under control of the Vandals and the Visigoths, while part of the territory temporarily returned to Roman imperial authority under the Byzantines.

In 711, the Umayyad conquest of Hispania marked a major cultural and political shift. Córdoba became the core of al-Andalus, the Muslim-controlled part of the Iberian Peninsula, and one of the most important cultural and economic centers of the medieval world. Under the Caliphate of Córdoba, the region produced intellectual output in science, philosophy, and architecture. The 11th century brought internal divisions with the fragmentation of the caliphate into taifas—small, independent kingdoms. Following Castilian military conquest of the Guadalquivir Valley, Christian settler activity in the area had its heyday in the 13th century. For the rest of the middle ages, locations in the south of the Guadalquivir valley also developed an identity as a militarised borderland with the Emirate of Granada (the remaining Muslim polity in the territory of the current-day region), which was eventually also conquered in 1492.

Cities like Seville and Cádiz played a central role in Spain's exploration and colonization of the New World, becoming major hubs for trade with colonies in the Americas. By the 16th century, Western Andalusia was the richest region of the Crown of Castile due to increasing agricultural output, although growth possibilities were squandered after 1580. Under the Crown of Castile, the current-day region was largely coterminous with the kingdoms of Seville, Córdoba, Jaén, and Granada. Land ownership became increasingly concentrated in the early modern period. In 1981, in the wake of the push of a regionalist movement that culminated with an overwhelming support to a 1980 referendum, the provinces of Almería, Cádiz, Córdoba, Granada, Huelva, Jaén, Málaga, and Seville configured as the standalone autonomous community of Andalusia. Andalusia remains an underdeveloped NUTS 2 statistical region of the European Union.

== Prehistory ==
=== Paleolithic ===
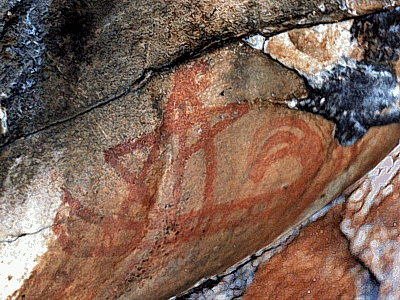
Laja Alta Cave, in Jimena de la Frontera

The presence of hominids in Andalusia dates back to the Lower Paleolithic, with archaeological remains of the Acheulean culture between 700,000 and 400,000 years old, however, the controversial finding of the so-called Man of Orce seems to point to a greater antiquity.

The main areas of settlement were the Alto Guadalquivir area and the southern area of Sierra Morena, on the terraces of the great rivers, which were used as circulation axes and food supply areas (hunting and gathering). During the Middle Paleolithic, characterized by the Homo neanderthalensis and the Mousterian culture, there was a climatic recrudescence that led to the use of caves as shelter. Testimony of this are the Cueva de la Carihuela, in Píñar, the Cueva de Zájara, in cuevas del Almanzora, and the Gibraltarian caves.

The Upper Paleolithic was marked by the retreat of the glaciation and the appearance of Homo sapiens whose habitat became widespread throughout Andalusia. The material culture was characterized by advances in the lithic industry and the appearance of the first manifestations of rock art. Examples of this are the paintings of the Pileta Cave, Ambrosio Cave (in Almería), Las Motillas Cave, Malalmuerzo Cave (in Granada), and Morrón Cave (in Jaén), all of them characterized by their schematism. Particularly noteworthy is the so-called Rock Art of the extreme south of the Iberian Peninsula, called in the Andalusian context Arte sureño ("Southern art"). In the Caves of Nerja that are located in the town of Maro, municipality of Nerja (Málaga), are some seal paintings dated as 42,000 years old that could be the oldest known work of art in the history of mankind.

=== Neolithic ===
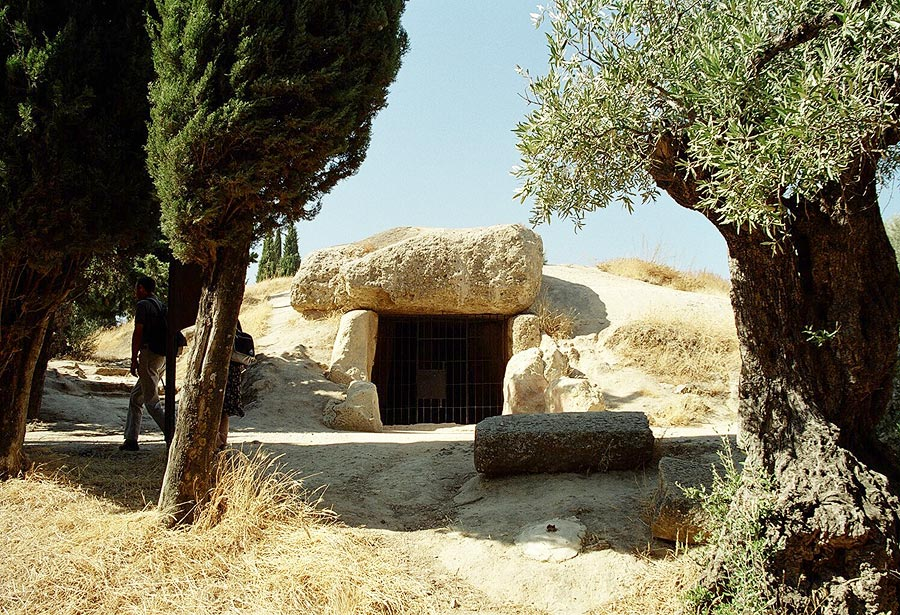
Megalithic construction of Dolmen of Menga

The Neolithic, characterized by a productive economy based on agriculture and livestock and with new samples of material culture such as polished stone and pottery, arrived in Andalusia around the 5th millennium BC. Being introduced by diffusion from the Eastern Mediterranean, the first Neolithic samples are located in the Levante Almeriense.

This period is characterized by the existence of two types of habitat or human settlements: the villages and the caves. The villages were simple groupings of huts with a circular base and walls of adobe or wood, located in river valleys or in more arid areas and whose activity was predominantly agricultural and livestock.

The caves, more frequent, were used both as dwellings and for burial. As for ceramics, the cardium pottery and Almagra pottery are characteristic.

Some of the existing Neolithic caves in Andalusia are the cueva de los Murciélagos, the cueva de la Mujer, the cueva de la Carigüela, the Cueva del Tesoro, and the Caves of Nerja.

=== Metal Age ===
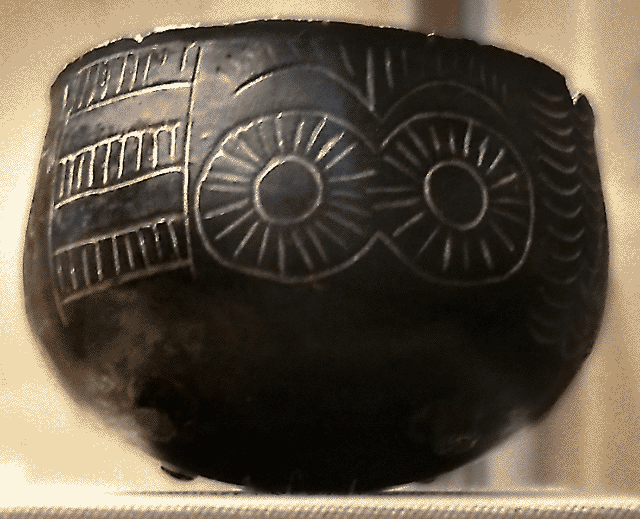
Eyed bowl from Los Millares

During the Metal Age it is characterized by the invention of metal smelting, which was introduced in Andalusia by peoples from the eastern Mediterranean. The introduction of metals in technology meant an important advance in the manufacture of tools for farming, hunting and fishing, as well as for warfare. The specialization in tools was such that the division of labor was achieved, favored by the surplus of production in agriculture and which would cause the first social stratification in different groups. Another of the important changes produced in this period was the development of transport and trade, due to the location of metal deposits and their transport to the areas of the Mediterranean Levantine arc. The Mediterranean became the main axis of trade which caused an intensification of all kinds of relations and a faster irradiation of technical advances and cultural exchanges that will precipitate the entry of Andalusia in the protohistoric phase.

The Metal Age is usually divided into three stages, using as nomenclature the name of the metal used in each of these phases: The Copper Age, the Bronze Age, and the Iron Age. In Andalusia during the Copper Age a series of important cultures developed, such as the Megalithic Culture, Los Millares Culture, Bell Beaker culture, Argaric culture. In the Iron Age, with the arrival of the colonizing peoples, the important civilization of Tartessos developed, with which Andalusia entered Protohistory.

== Ancient Age ==
=== Eastern colonizations, Tartessos, and Turdetania ===
Approximate area of extension and influence of the civilization of Tartessos

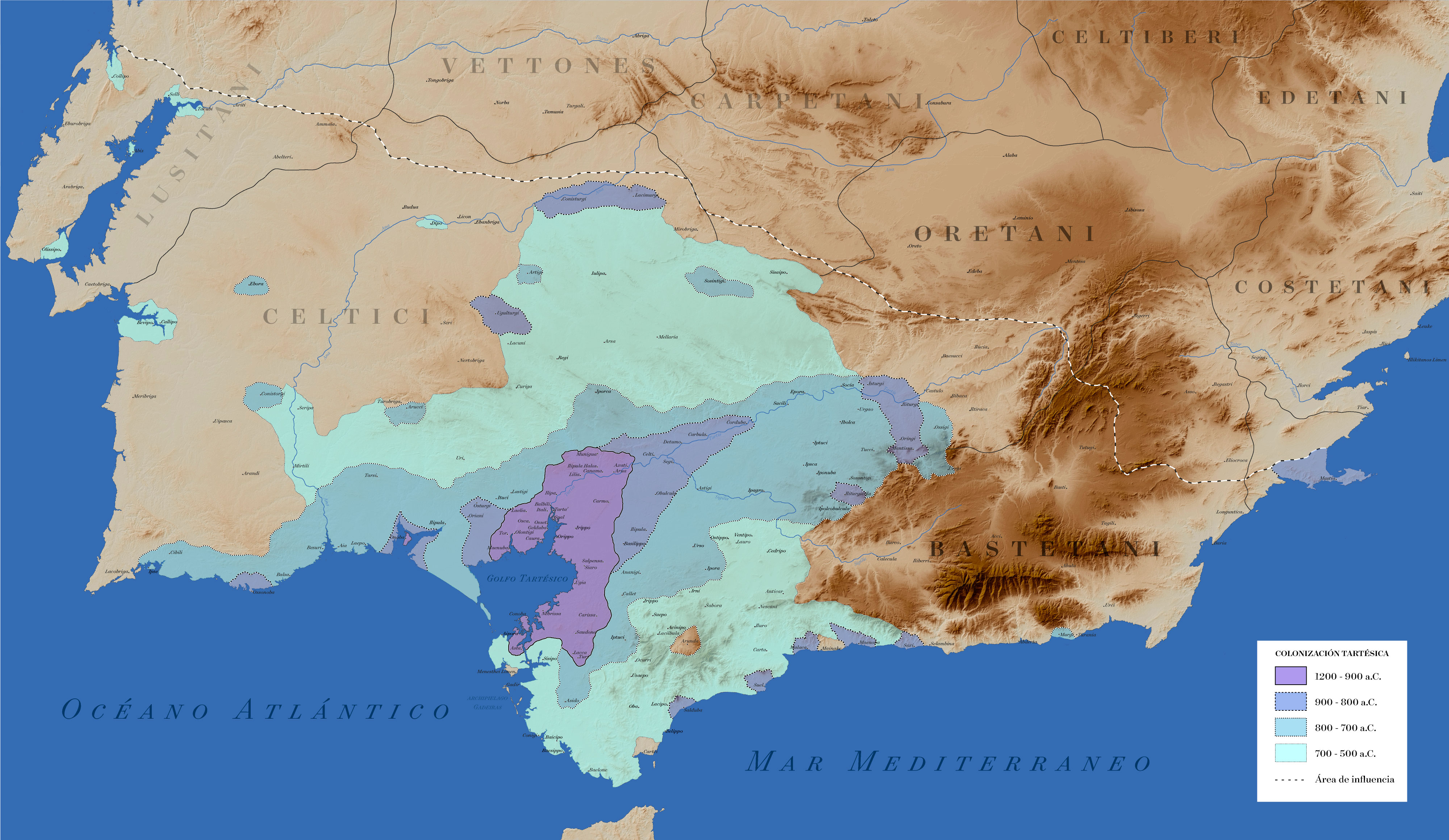
Tartessian colonization and toponymy

Indigenous peoples that arose after the disappearance of Tartessos

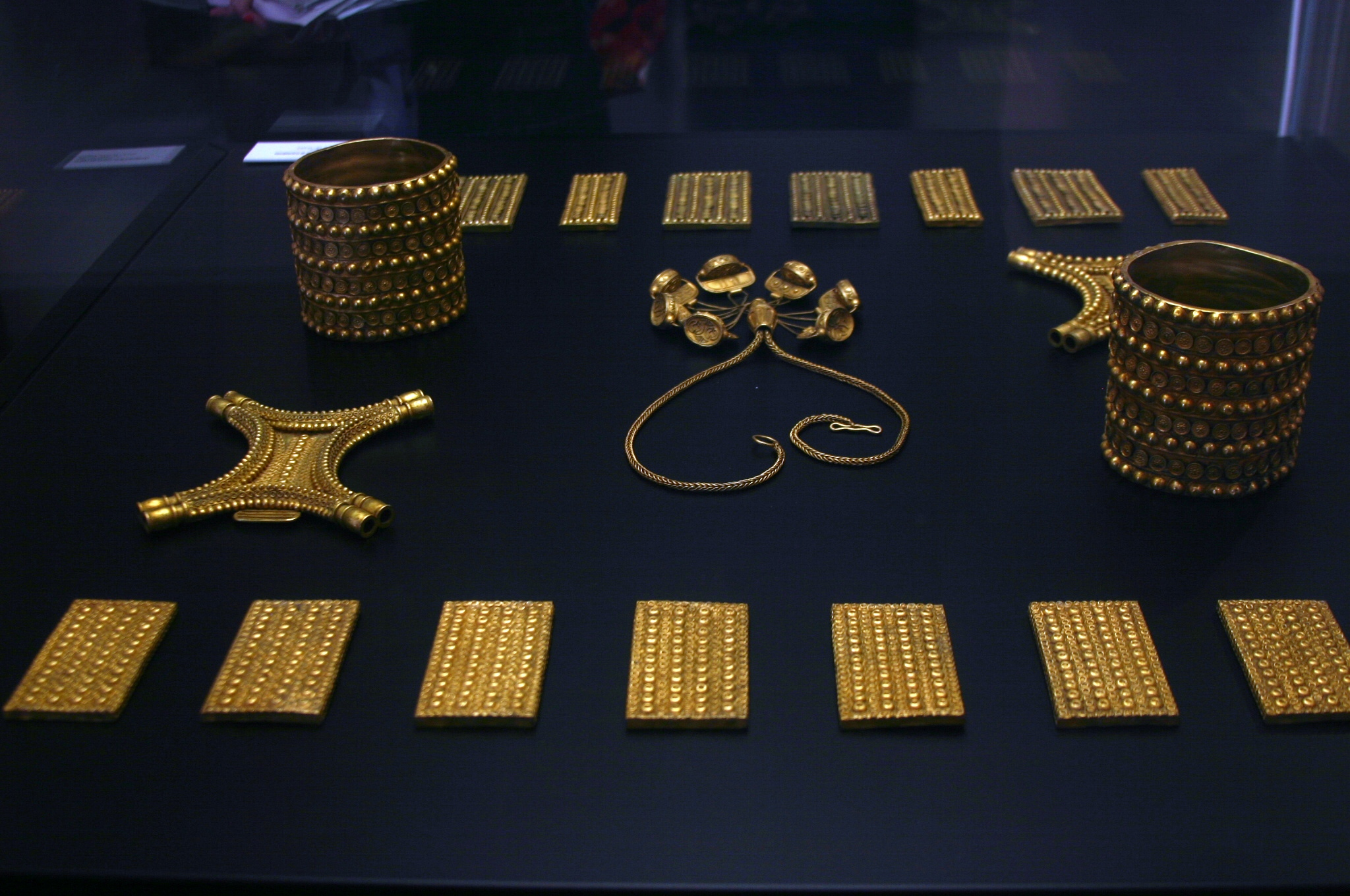
Treasure of El Carambolo

From the 10th century onwards, the Phoenicians of Tyre exercised hegemony over the rest of the Phoenician cities. Around the 9th century, a colonization process took place with the creation of several colonies and factories in peninsular territory, among them Malaka and Cerro del Villar (Málaga), Gadir (Cádiz), Doña Blanca (El Puerto de Santa María), Abdera (Adra), Sexi (Almuñécar), Cerro de la Mora (Moraleda de Zafayona), among others. These colonists used the Andalusian territory to obtain various resources and for its strategic importance as a forced passage point on the trade route between the Mediterranean and the Atlantic. The commercial hegemony of Tyre lasted until 573 BC when, after a thirteen-year siege, it fell into the hands of Nebuchadnezzar, king of Babylon. With the fall of Tyre, trade between Tartessos and Phoenicia was blocked.

Apparently, Tartessos also maintained commercial exchanges with the Greek Phocians who according to Herodotus were their allies. However, after the battle of Alalia, around 537 BC, the Phocaean trade was also blocked by the Carthaginians or Punics, who around the year 500 BC definitively relieved the Phoenicians in the Mediterranean trade, controlling militarily the Strait of Gibraltar and making inaccessible the penetration of the other Mediterranean peoples towards the Atlantic. Likewise, the influence of the Etruscans, another people commercially present in Tartessos, ended up falling after the rise of Rome. All this caused an irreversible commercial crisis in Tartessos.

From all of the above, it can be said that the Tartessos civilization developed from the Old and Middle Bronze Age, simultaneously with the cultures of El Argar and Los Millares until the 6th century BC when it collapsed. Tartessos extended over most of the Andalusian territory, the Algarve and part of the Region of Murcia, although its main axis was located in the triangle formed by the cities of Huelva, Seville and Cadiz. Its most significant activity was mining and metallurgy (gold, silver, iron and copper), although agriculture, livestock, fishing and maritime trade were also practiced, where it was a strategic point between the Mediterranean and Atlantic routes, key for Phoenician trade with tin from the British Isles.

According to the chronology of the colonizations and the archaeological remains, Tartessos arose fundamentally from the acculturation of the indigenous population by the influence of the Phoenician colonizers, whose phonetic alphabet, according to some is the basis of the writing of the Tartessian language. The burnished grid pottery, with red varnish and the cult to oriental deities such as Astarte, Baal or Melkart seem to indicate this, as shown by the Treasure of El Carambolo and the Temple of Melkart in Cadiz, among others. The contact with the Greeks and the Etruscans also produced an important acculturation that introduced Tartessos in the scope of the most important civilizations of the Mediterranean, becoming the first great existing civilization in the Iberian Peninsula.

Almost all the documentary news that we have of Tartessos are due to ancient Greek authors. They often confuse the historical with the mythical or semi-mythical, with kings such as Geryon, Habis, Norax and Argantonius. Likewise, the Atlantis described by Plato in his dialogues Timaeus and Critias with the capital or city of Tartessos has been frequently identified.

After the fall of Tartessos, the territory of present-day Andalusia came under Carthaginian control. However, as heir to their culture emerged Turdetania, a region populated by the Turdetans, an Iberian people who, according to Strabo:

...they are considered the most cultured of the Iberians, since they know writing and, according to their ancestral traditions, they even have historical chronicles, poems and laws in verse that they say are six thousand years old.

— Strabo, III 1,6.

Parallel to the Turdetans, the territory of Tartessos was inhabited by other indigenous peoples: the Turduli, Bastetani, Oretani and Cynetes. The growing ascendancy of Rome meant that after a long period of Punic Wars, the Carthaginians were finally expelled by the Romans from the Iberian Peninsula.

=== Roman Baetica ===
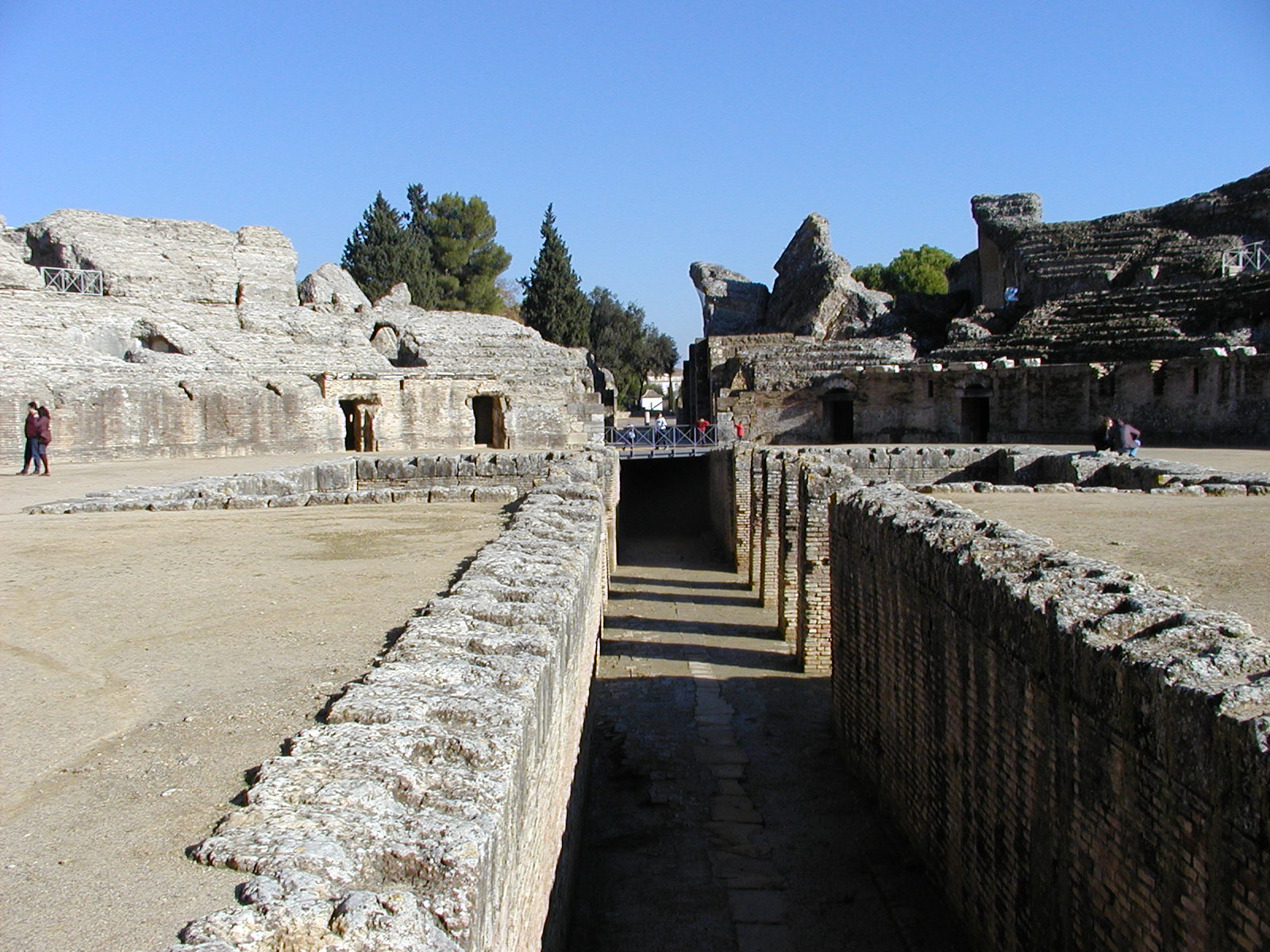
Amphitheater of Italica, one of the largest of the Imperium

First Roman division of Hispania, where Hispania Ulterior can be seen.

Hispania according to the Roman provincial division of 27 a. B. C., where the limits of Baetica can be appreciated.

Hispania in the time of Diocletian

In 218 BC, the Roman general Publius Cornelius Scipio landed in Empúries to cut off supplies to the Carthaginians. After defeating them in some battles, in 210 BC he was appointed consul, at which time the Second Punic War and the conquest of the Iberian Peninsula by the Romans began. After the war the Carthaginians abandoned Andalusia and their presence was replaced by that of the Romans, who had to face some pockets of resistance.

As a result of the Roman victory, the province of Hispania Ulterior was created, which covered almost the entire Andalusian territory, except for the northern part of the provinces of Jaén and Granada and the part of the province of Almería east of the river Almanzora, which were under the administration of the Tarraconense province and later of the Carthaginense. Later, in the time of Augustus, a new administrative division was created, the Baetica province with its capital in Corduba.

The territory was articulated through a network of roads arranged on the basis of three great natural axes of passage: the Baetic depression, the Intrabetic basin and the coast. Around these axes there were important population centers, such as Corduba (the capital), Gades, Malaca, Italica, Iliberris, Hispalis, Ostippo, Obulco, which monopolized the collection of taxes, trade and the exploitation of d nathe ager, besides being great centers of penetration of the Roman culture and its distribution throughout their areas of rural influence. The dividing character of great rivers such as the Guadiana and the Guadalquivir, the importance of the great mining districts such as Almadén, the natural frontier of Sierra Morena, the importance of large population centers and the ease of communication by the sea, are elements that served as frontiers and at the same time configured a territorial space with different realities but with a certain cohesion.

[...] result of a perception that establishes differences. The main purpose is the exploitation of resources, in such a way that the beginning of Andalusia as a known territory already indicates something that will be constant in certain periods: colonization [...]

— Cano García, G.: "Evaluación de los límites de Andalucía y percepción del territorio"

Baetica had an important contribution to the whole Roman Empire, economically, culturally and politically. In the economic field continued to be very significant the extraction of minerals (gold, silver, copper and lead) and agriculture, with the production and export of cereals, oil and wine, the latter two especially famous throughout the Empire along with garum. In the political field, Baetica was for a long time a senatorial province that, due to its high degree of romanization, depended on the political power of the Senate, not on the military power of the Emperor. It was here that the decisive Battle of Munda was fought between populares and optimates, supporters of Caesar and Pompey respectively. It also gave Rome the emperors Trajan and Hadrian, natives of Italica, and the Cordovan philosopher Seneca.

The Roman conquest, both economic and political, and the deep Romanization of Baetica put an end to a great extent to the autochthonous culture "[...] losing the existence of a remote consciousness of the Andalusian land as a subtle vapor [...]". However, it was an early Christianization, which took strong roots in the Andalusian coasts and which marked a new cultural development throughout the Iberian Peninsula. In the 4th century, Christianity became tolerated in the Empire and was later proclaimed the official and only permitted religion, and the Council of Elvira, a fundamental milestone in the History of Christianity in Spain, was held in the Baetic lands, attended by eleven Baetic bishops, out of a total of nineteen attendees.

== Middle Ages ==
=== First barbarian invasions ===
Visigothic Hispania around the year 700

In 411, by virtue of a foedus agreed with the Western Roman Empire, the Suebi people, Vandals and Alans from the north and south settled in the Iberian Peninsula. The Vandals Silingi, led by Fredebal, more powerful than their Hasdingi brothers, received the fertile province of Baetica, where they remained for a short time before moving on to the Maghreb. It is not possible to specify in which areas of Andalusia they settled, due to their short permanence and the lack of archaeological finds.

=== Visigothic Baetica and the Byzantine presence ===
With the irruption of the Visigoths in the political scene of the Iberian Peninsula in 418, the Vandals were expelled. The southern character of Andalusia and its strong Romanization and consolidation of a territorial oligarchy, capable of having its own armies, gave the Baetica a special character. It was the last territory controlled de facto by the Visigoths, and the one with the greatest political instability. Proof of this is that in 521 the pontiff appointed vicar for Lusitania and Baetica to the metropolitan bishop of Seville (Sallust), implying that the ecclesiastical jurisdiction of Tarragona did not control de facto the territories of the southern peninsular.

From 531 the Visigothic king Teudis carried out a rapid expansion towards the south, installing his court in Seville, in order to have a better control of his operations in the south of the peninsula. He even led an unsuccessful offensive against the Byzantine power established in Settem (Ceuta). The Baetica was definitively integrated in the Visigothic kingdom of Toledo, although when the interests of the Hispanic-Roman landed oligarchy were in danger, rebellions, such as those of Athanagild and Hermenegild, took place.

The rebellion of Atanagildo, with the support of the oligarchy of the Baetica, supposed the entrance in action of the Byzantine power, in expansion under Justinian I. The importance of the Andalusian coast for trade in the Mediterranean meant that it was incorporated into the Byzantine province of Spania. However, the Byzantine presence in Andalusia was fleeting, since the Visigothic kingdom of Toledo always wanted to recover the lost coastline. The campaigns, first of Leovigild and then of Suintila, led to the creation of a unified power in the Iberian Peninsula.

During the Visigothic period, religiously and culturally Leander of Seville and Isidore of Seville were fundamental personalities, who carried out their work mainly in Seville.

=== Al-Ándalus ===
Emirate of Cordoba

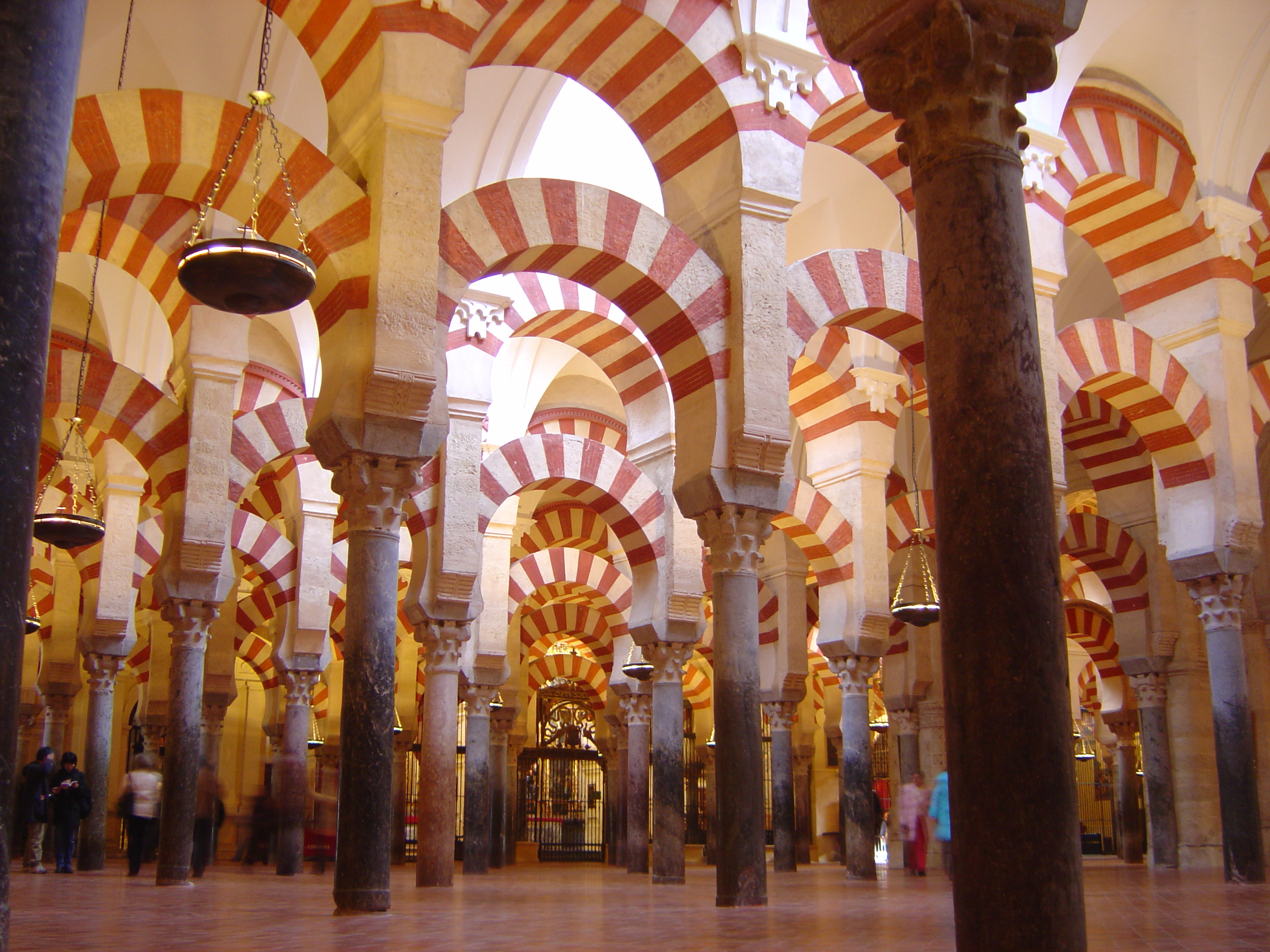
Mosque-Cathedral of Cordoba

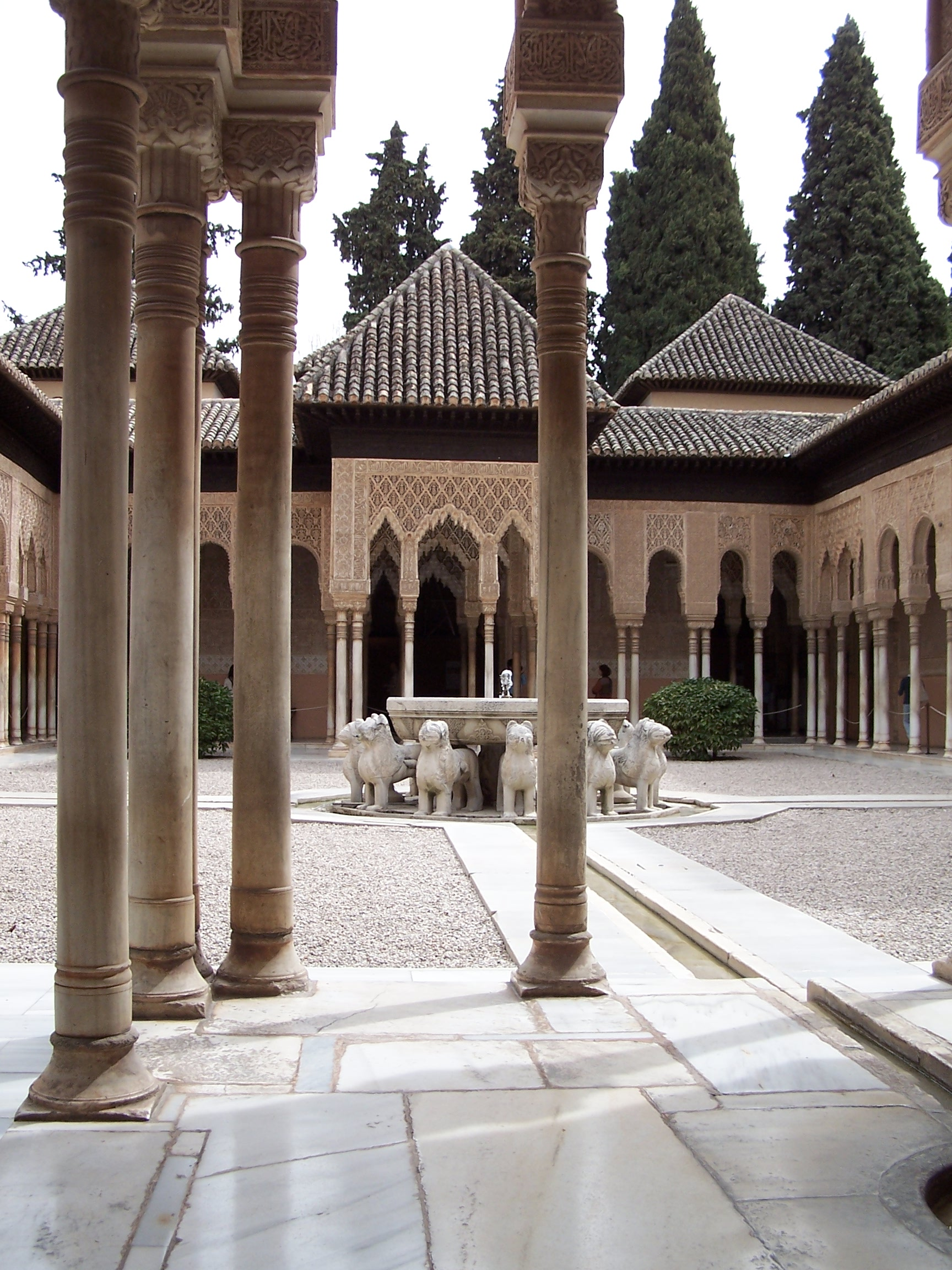
Patio de los Leones of The Alhambra

Nasrid Kingdom of Granada

In the middle of the struggle between Rodrigo and the successors of Witiza, in 711, after the military incursion of Tarik, the battle of Guadalete and the subsequent campaigns of Musa, the fall of the Visigothic power and the Muslim invasion of the Iberian Peninsula (a thesis that a small group of authors, mainly Ignacio Olagüe, consider rather an Islamic Revolution). From then until the taking of Granada in 1492, the peninsular territories under Islamic power were generically called al-Andalus, whose history was a succession of various Muslim states.

The Emirate of Córdoba, which initially depended in politics and religion on the Umayyad Caliphate of Damascus, in 756 with Abd al-Rahman I became independent in civil matters from the Abbasid Caliphate, ceasing to be a peripheral territory and becoming a center of political decision. Already at the end of the period of the independent emirate, between 880 and 918, the Muladí Umar ibn Hafsun, born in the Kūra of Ronda, led a revolt against the Cordovan power. Infighting was a constant in al-Andalus due to the conflicting interests of the various racial and religious communities living there. The dominant aristocracy of Arab origin was frequently opposed by Berbers, Hispania-romans, Mozarabs, Muladis, Jews, Slavs and freed slaves from the north of the peninsula or from Central Europe.

The maximum Umayyad power in al-Andalus came with the proclamation in 912 of the Caliphate of Córdoba by Abd al-Rahman III, who proclaimed himself caliph, consummating the rupture of religious dependence on the East. Although the territorial limits at that time exceeded those of the current Andalusian territory, it is no less certain that the Guadalquivir Valley was the axis of Muslim power in the peninsula, with Córdoba, the most populated city, as capital and seat of the great mezquita, and with Medina Azahara as the aulic city symbol of the new caliphal power. North of the Guadiana were the three great military marks of Mérida, Toledo and Zaragoza in continuous rebellion. (Note: Cordoba was the most important city of the Caliphate, which reached 250000 inhabitants in 935 and 450000 in 1000, being during the tenth century one of the largest cities in the world and a financial, cultural, artistic and commercial center of the first order. Other important cities were Toledo (37000), Almeria (27000), Zaragoza (17000) and Valencia (15000).)

[The territorial limits] "are set back to the north in relation to earlier times, approaching the Guadalquivir/Guadiana watershed and, therefore, constitute a clear precedent of the present ones" [...]

— Cano García, G. "Evaluación de los límites de Andalucía y percepción del territorio"

The internal division fomented by Almanzor and their descendants, the Amirids, triggered the fitna. The deposition of Hisham III and the abolition of the caliphate in 1031, caused the kūras, dominated by Arab, Berber or Slavic clans, to proclaim themselves independent, with the consequent fragmentation of the Umayyad state into a multitude of kingdoms known as First Taifas. (Note: Almanzor, born in Turrush and builder of Medina Alzahira. Turrush has been identified by some with a settlement outside the walls of Algeciras and with Torrox. There is also a castle called "de Turrush" in Fuentes de Cesna, anejo of the municipality of Algarinejo, in the province of Granada.) In this new situation, the Taifa of Seville had a special role, which achieved great power with the Abbadid monarchs al-Mutadid and al-Mutamid, who extended their dominions over southern Portugal, Murcia and most of present-day Andalusia, with the exception of the taifa zirí de Granada. After the conquest of Toledo in 1085 by Alfonso VI, the Castilian-Leonese threat became increasingly greater. Therefore, the kings of Seville, Granada, Malaga, Almeria and Badajoz allied themselves and asked for military aid to the Almoravids. These they established themselves in the city of Algeciras forming a coalition with the kings of taifas that defeated the Christians in the battle of Zalaca, in 1086. However, there were new Christian offensives, such as the capture of the castle of Aledo, which meant the blockade of the routes between the Taifa of Seville and its territories and the taifas of the east of al-Andalus. Therefore, the king of Seville returned to claim the help of the Almoravid emir Yusuf ibn Tashfin, who returned to the peninsula in 1088, but not to fight the Christians but to conquer one by one all the taifas and impose the Almoravid power throughout al-Andalus, installing the capital in Granada and ruling until the middle of the XII century, when the Almohad expansion in North Africa weakened the military capacity of the Almoravids of al-Andalus, whose unity was broken again giving rise to the second Taifa kingdoms, between 1144 and 1170.

After the expedition of Alfonso the Battler, with which the Mozarabs collaborated, a multitude of Christians were deported to Africa by decree of the Almoravid sultan Ali ibn Yusuf in the year 1126 (thousands of them would manage to return to Spain two decades later, settling in Toledo) and a few years later those who had remained, subjected to continuous harassment, were forced, by decree of the Almohad sultan Abd al-Mumin, to emigrate to Castile and León or become Islamized, under penalty of life and confiscation of their goods. According to Francisco Javier Simonet, the tyranny of the Almoravids was such that the Muslims of Seville themselves requested the protection of Emperor Alfonso VII of León, obliging themselves to pay tribute to him.

These taifas were later subdued by the Almohads, who established their capital in Seville, managing to stop the Christian advance with great victories as in the battle of Alarcos in 1195. However, from the beginning they had problems to dominate the whole territory of al-Andalus, especially Granada and Levante, where for many years the King Wolf resisted with Christian support. Finally, after Pope Innocent III called for a crusade in al-Andalus, the victory of the Christian coalition in the battle of Las Navas de Tolosa, in 1212, marked the beginning of the end of the Almohad dynasty, not only because of the result of the encounter but also the subsequent death of Miramamolin, which opened a succession struggle that ended up sinking the Almohad caliphate and determined the appearance of the third kingdoms of Taifas and the rise of the Benimerines in the Maghreb. In 1232 Muhammad I proclaimed himself emir of Arjona, Jaén, Guadix and Baza and in 1237 of Granada, founding the Nasrid Kingdom of Granada.

=== Andalusia in the Crown of Castile ===
The Kingdoms of Andalusia in the context of the territories of the Crown of Castile

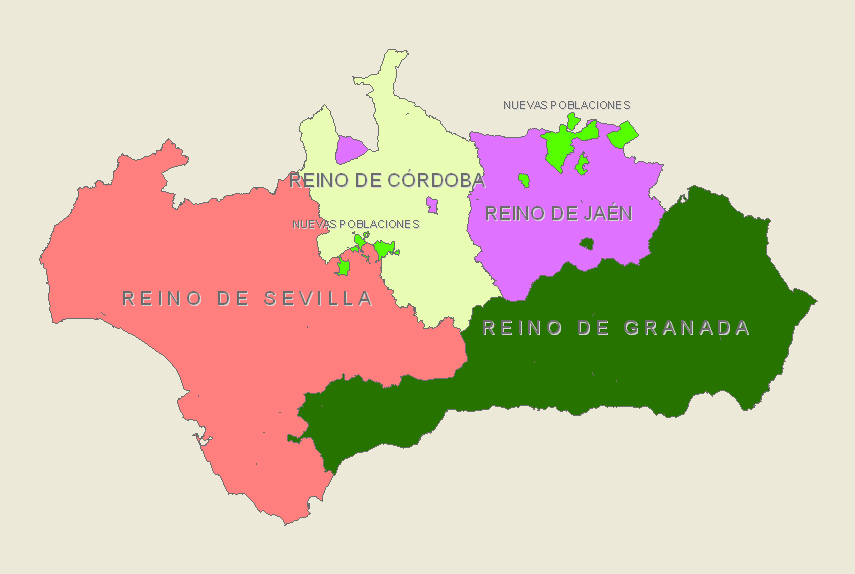
The map shows the extent of the kingdoms of Jaén, Córdoba, Sevilla and Granada, called the Four Kingdoms of Andalusia

The weakness derived from the disintegration of the Almohad power and the subsequent creation of the third Taifa kingdoms, favored the rapid Christian conquest or the reconquista of the lands of the Guadalquivir valley by Saint Ferdinand and Alfonso X the Wise. Baeza was conquered in 1227, Córdoba in 1236, Jaén in 1246 and Seville in 1248, giving rise to the germ of historical Andalusia, conditioned by the permanence of part of the Muslim population (the Mudejares), by the repopulation with Christian people from more northern peninsular territories, by the settlement of colonies of foreign merchants and by a long process of feudalization of the Andalusian territory. All this under the influence of the Nasrid kingdom of Granada through the Frontier or Banda morisca and the threat of the incursions of the Benimerines, definitively defeated in the Battle of Río Salado in 1340.

After the Mudejar revolt of 1264, the former Muslim population was expelled and Lower Andalusia was slowly repopulated with Christians from the north. At the end of the Middle Ages, Andalusia was the Spanish territory with the largest presence of foreigners, mainly Italians and in particular Genoese.

== Modern Age ==
The Kingdom of Granada survived until 1492, when the Catholic Monarchs ended the conquest. The Reconquest of Granada in 1492 put an end to Muslim rule. Since then and throughout the Ancient Regime, the territory of present-day Andalusia was constituted by the kingdoms of Jaén, Córdoba, Sevilla and Granada, all of them integrated into the Crown of Castile and often referred to as the four kingdoms of Andalusia. (Note: These kingdoms were in force, within the framework of Spain, until the provincial division carried out by Javier de Burgos in 1833.)

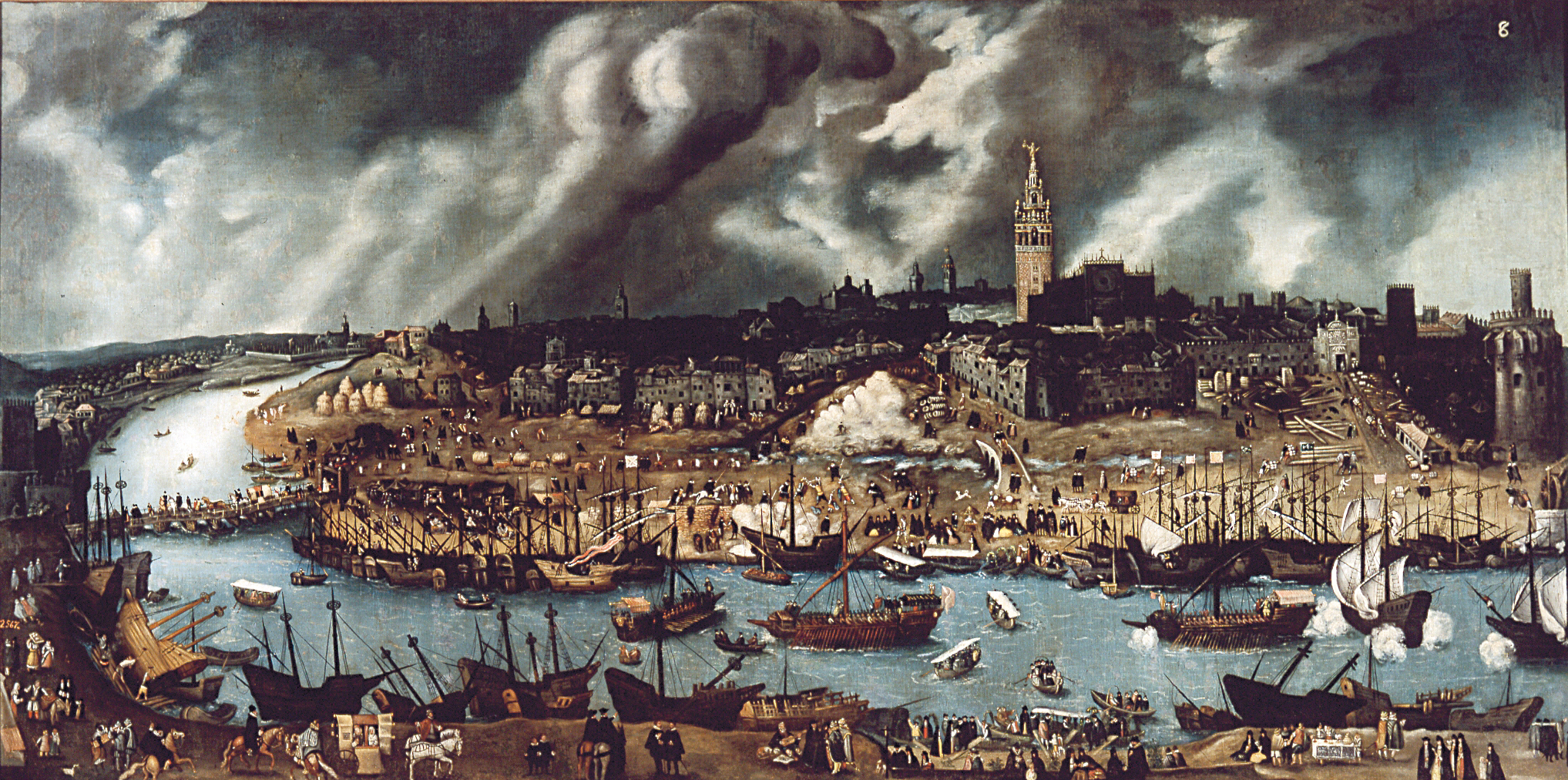
View of Seville and its port in the 16th century, by Alonso Sánchez Coello

On 3 August 1492 the first Columbian expedition departed from the town onubense of Palos de la Frontera, which resulted in the discovery of America. Many Andalusians mostly from Huelva, such as the Pinzón brothers, the Niño brothers and so many others participated in that enterprise, which is usually taken as a milestone to mark the end of the Middle Ages and the beginning of the Modern Age. The sailors of the coast of Huelva were a key piece in the realization of the Columbian project, since they had a long tradition and nautical experience, and had demonstrated their qualities in the Atlantic and Mediterranean navigations and in the wars with the neighboring kingdom of Portugal. The Lugares colombinos, among which the monastery of La Rábida stands out for its fame, are witnesses of this era.

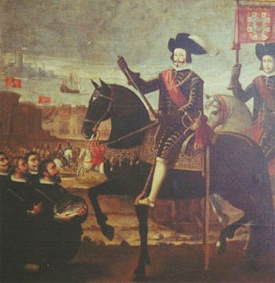
Gaspar Pérez de Guzmán y Sandoval, IX Duke of Medina Sidonia on the Algarve journey

The beginning of contact with America by the Castilians and its maintenance until the end of the colonial period, was made almost exclusively from Andalusia. The reason for the importance of the American phenomenon for Andalusia lies in the fact that all traffic with the new continent became a monopoly, legally Castilian, but physically Andalusian. Andalusians for the most part were also the protagonists of the so-called "minor or Andalusian voyages", that ended the monopoly of Admiral Colón in the voyages to America. This is a period of splendor and great boom for the region, which becomes the richest and most cosmopolitan of Spain and one of the most influential regions worldwide. The Kingdom of Granada, on the other hand, had its interests in the Mediterranean, so its contacts with the American colonies were quite minor. However, the 17th century was disastrous for Andalusia, due to the epidemic of 1649. There was also a new seigniorialization of the lands, with the consequent detriment for the Andalusian peasants. A key event in the territory of present-day Andalusia was the War of the Alpujarras of 1570–1572. At the end of it, the vast majority of the Morisco population was expelled from the land where they had lived for generations. At first they were redistributed in the interior of Castile, and then expelled from Spain in 1609. Many of these Moriscos ended up in cities in northern Africa such as Fez or Tetuan.

From the first half of the 17th century Andalusia suffered an acute crisis and economic stagnation, in the context of the decline of Spain. Between 1640 and 1655 revolts occurred in various parts of Andalusia. The fiscal abuses of the Count-Duke of Olivares led in 1641 to the Duke of Medina Sidonia and the Marquis of Ayamonte to organize a conspiracy, with controversial intentions, historiographically known as conspiracy of the Duke of Medina Sidonia.

=== 18th century ===
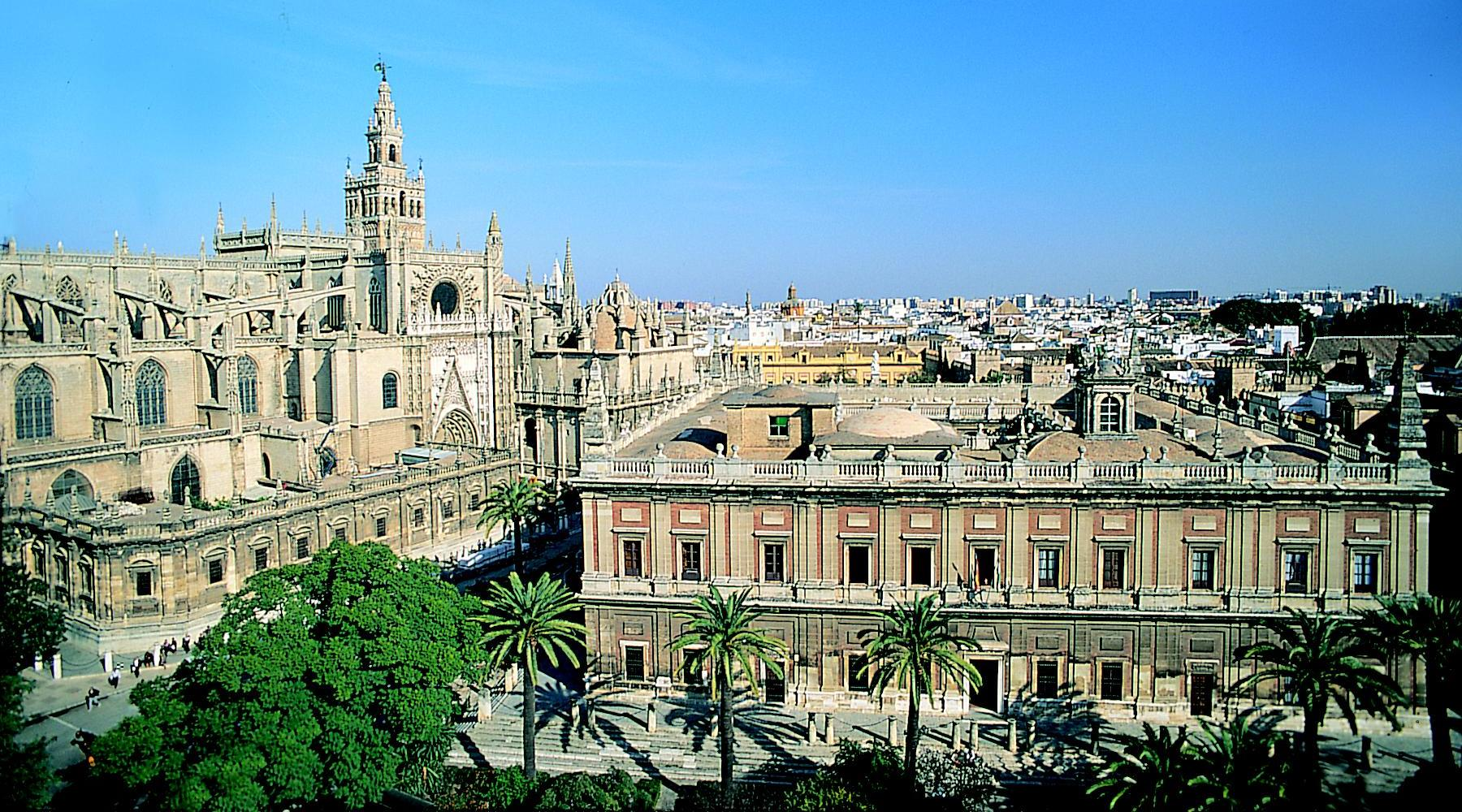
Casa de contratación and Seville Cathedral

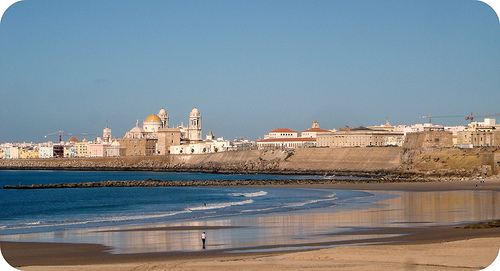
View of Cadiz, where the American commerce was transferred in 1717

The crises of the 17th century had their culmination with the War of the Spanish Succession, which had hardly any repercussions in Andalusia, which was from the beginning on the side of Philip of Anjou. However, the English and Dutch squadron attacked in 1702 the Atlantic coast near Cadiz, and although they failed in their attempt to establish themselves there, they captured Gibraltar in 1704 taking advantage of its defenselessness, remaining in English hands after the Treaty of Utrecht.

The subsequent Bourbon decentralization meant for Andalusia, as a territory integrated into the Crown of Castile, the reorganization of the royal audiencias and chancillerías, as well as the organization of the territory into provinces and intendancies, heirs of the old kingdoms, the annulment of the privileges and liberties of the municipalities and the abolition of their own institutions.

The new royal power formed a radial communications network around the court, with the intention of centralizing the agrarian, mining and commercial resources, which contributed to the traditional disarticulation of the territory, as it

[...] breaks the previous structures adapted to the environment, to establish north-south relations; but not so much next to the east-west directions, but rather at the expense of these[...]

— Cano García, G. "Evaluación de los límites de Andalucía y percepción del territorio"

In 1717 the Casa de Contratación de Indias was moved from Seville to Cadiz, displacing from the metropolis of Seville the center of the American trade, which had resided there since the beginning of the 16th century||.

In the second half of the 18th century, the intendant of Seville and of the army of the Four Kingdoms of Andalusia, Pablo de Olavide, did important work in the repopulation of some areas of Andalusia. As superintendent of the Nuevas Poblaciones de Sierra Morena y Andalucía, he encouraged more than 1,400 foreign families to settle in various colonies in Sierra Morena in accordance with the Fuero de las Nuevas Poblaciones of 1767. This repopulation was a project of more than forty years, for which he had broad powers, the support of Campomanes and the wealth of the properties confiscated from the Jesuits, expelled in 1767. Over time, the colonists underwent a profound assimilation of the Andalusian culture

With the aim of carrying out economic, social and educational reforms, the fruit of Enlightenment thought, the Sociedad Económica de los Amigos del País of Cadiz (1774), Seville (1775), Granada (1775) were created, Vera (1775), Sanlúcar de Barrameda (1780), Puerto Real (1785), Medina Sidonia (1786), Jaén (1786), El Puerto de Santa María (1788) and Málaga.

Also, new cities arose, with the objective of repopulating regions that wanted to develop, such as Linares and La Carolina, in Jaén.

== Modern Age ==
=== 19th Century ===
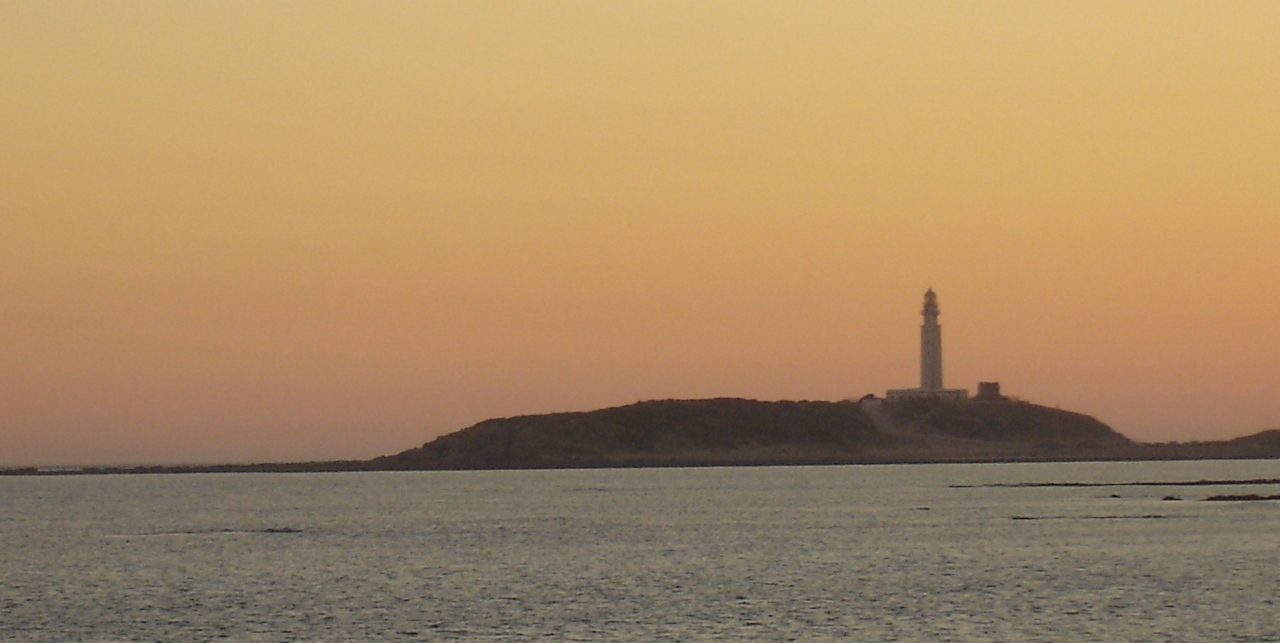
Cape Trafalgar, on whose shores the homonymous battle took place

The Cantonal Revolution of 1873 had a very important activity in all Andalusia

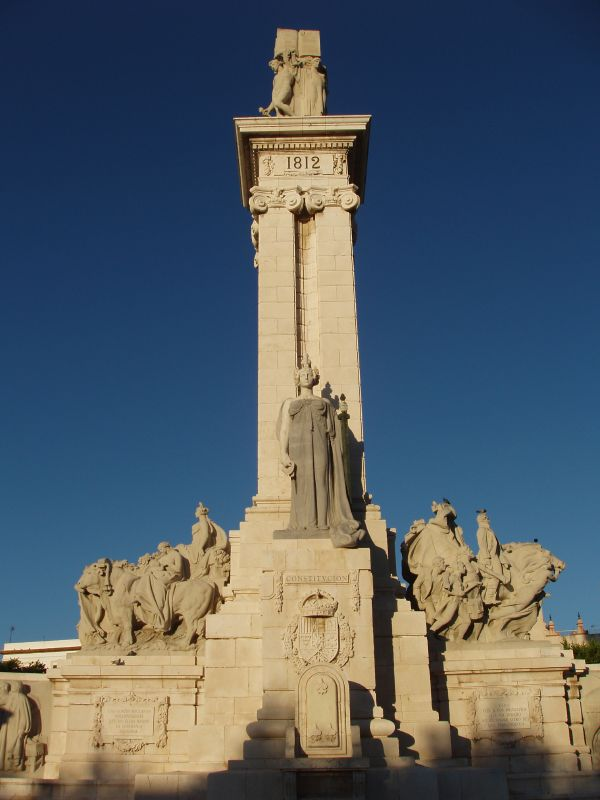
Monument to the Cortes de Cádiz

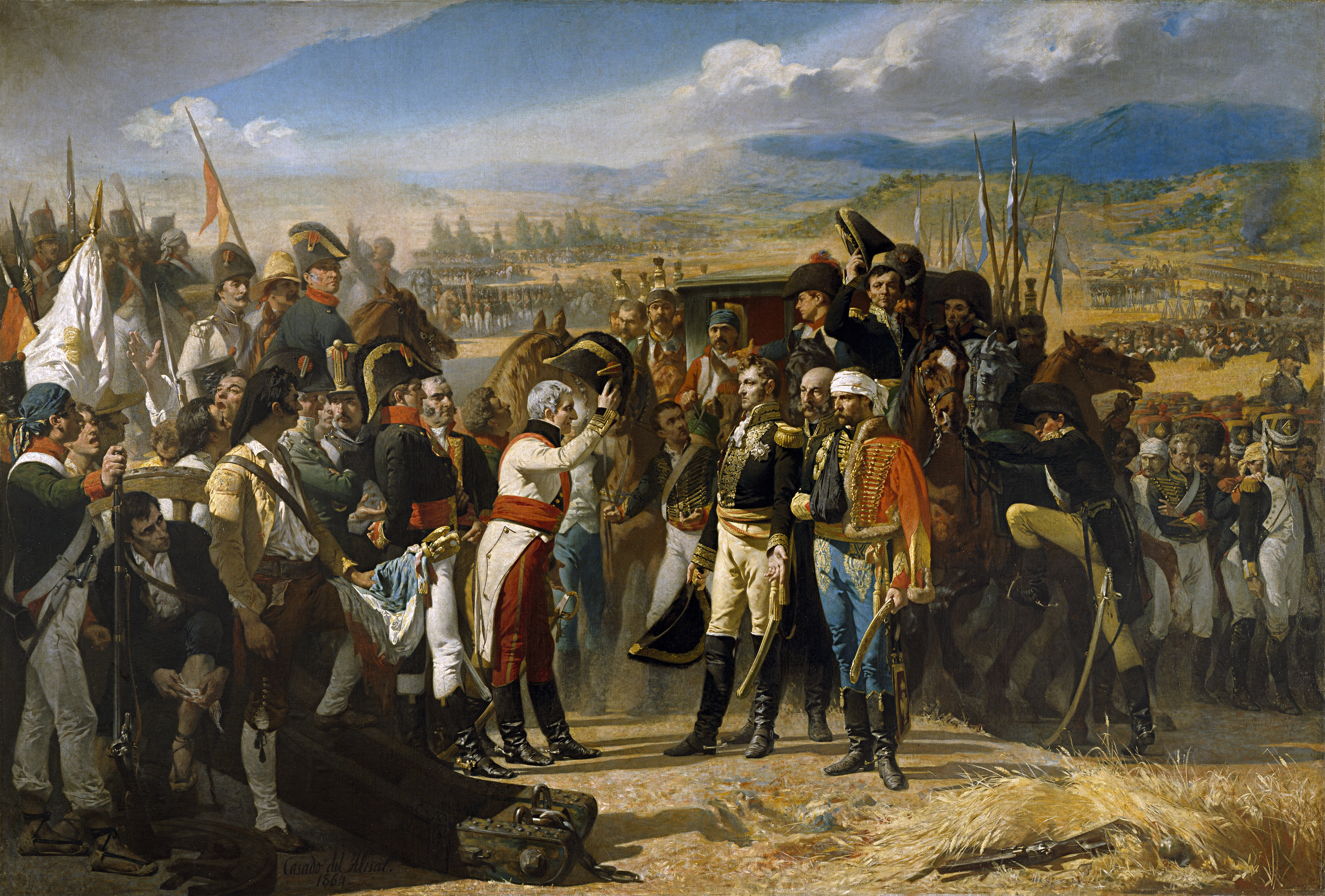
The Surrender of Bailén by José Casado del Alisal depicts the Battle of Bailén in 1808

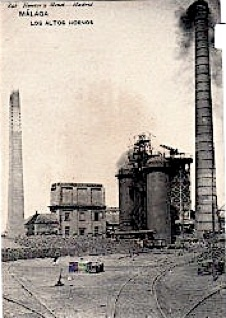
Altos Hornos de Málaga Fábrica de La Constancia, 1847

In 1805 the alliance between Charles IV and Napoleon provoked the Spanish participation in the naval war against England, which was decided in the Battle of Trafalgar, which took place in the waters off the coast of Cadiz and resulted in the defeat of the Franco-Spanish squadron against the English fleet. In 1808, Napoleon troops entered the Iberian Peninsula under the pretext of invading Portugal together with the Spanish army. However, Napoleon took the opportunity to treacherously overthrow the Spanish rulers and take over the country. This led to a popular insurrection and the consequent War of Independence, in which Andalusia played a decisive role in the resistance against the invader, with the Battle of Bailén, which was the first Spanish victory over the French, with the movimiento juntero and with the Cortes de Cádiz, which on 19 March 1812 proclaimed the first liberal constitution of Spain, popularly called la Pepa. The constitution was sworn by King Ferdinand VII on his return to Spain but the monarch soon annulled it and restoring absolutism.

Andalusia was characterized by its defense of liberalism against Ferdinand's absolutism, being Cadiz the main bastion, with the proximity to Gibraltar as a base of meeting of the liberals and favorable place for circumstantial escapes. In 1820, after the failed pronunciamiento of Riego in Las Cabezas de San Juan, Arcos de la Frontera and other Andalusian cities, the events in Galicia caused Ferdinand VII to retake the Constitution, giving way to the so-called Liberal Triennium, during which the king continued conspiring to reestablish absolutism. In 1823 the French army (called "the Hundred Thousand Sons of Saint Louis") invaded Spain and the liberals took refuge in Cadiz with Ferdinand VII as hostage. The city resisted a long siege that was ended by a pact: the square would be surrendered and the King would be released but he would accept the Constitution of 1812. This was done but, as soon as he was freed, King Ferdinand returned to absolutism, giving way to the Ominous Decade.

With the death of Ferdinand VII and the emergence of Carlism, liberal Andalusia reacted in 1835 by creating provincial liberal boards, which federated to form the Junta Suprema de Andalucía, based in Andújar, whose objective was the progressive reforms, pursuing the replacement of conde de Toreno by Mendizábal and the Royal Statute by a new liberal constitution.

With the reign of Isabel II, the constitution of 1845 again gave more power to the monarchy and caciquismo was a constant in national politics, with exceptions such as the liberal bourgeoisie of Malaga that promoted the industrialization of the city and the province, making Malaga a leader in sectors such as iron and steel or textile manufacturing, that would quickly go into decline due to the poor articulation of the country, the very deficient means of transport in southern Spain and the tariff barriers on the import of English coal, to protect Asturian mining.

The discontent led to the Revolution of 1868, called la Gloriosa ("the glorious"), started in Cadiz and spread throughout the rest of the country, leading to the Sexenio Democrático, the proclamation of the First Republic in 1873 and the Cantonal Revolution, of federalist character, with a very strong activity in Andalusia, whose most significant examples were the Cadiz Canton or the Malaga Canton, the second longest lasting after the Cartagena.

The Monarchist Restoration, led by Antonio Cánovas del Castillo from Málaga, brought with it the new Constitution of 1876, as well as a great political immobility favored by the bipartisanship, which further aggravated the serious situation of caciquismo reigning.

The 19th century in Andalusia was a century of contrasts, but expansive from the economic point of view, since the Andalusian industry had an important weight in the Spanish economy during the 19th century. In 1856, Andalusia was the second Spanish region in terms of degree of industrialization, between 1856 and 1900 Andalusia had a rate of industrialization above the national average in the branches of food, metallurgy, chemistry and ceramics, from 1915 this supremacy was reduced to the branches of food and chemistry.

From the French invasion of 1808 until 1898, there was a long process of independence of the overseas colonies, culminating in the disaster of 1898, which damaged Spain as a whole and especially Andalusia, because of its commercial links with America. Banditry intensified, Andalusia's endemic problems were not solved and Andalusian society lagged behind other areas of Spain, Europe and America. A small bourgeois class developed in provinces such as Malaga where there were no large farms, but not in the region as a whole due to the poor management of the disentailments and the lack of an authentic agrarian reform, which would put an end to the latifundia and the precarious situation of day labor workers. The abolition of the jurisdictional lordships, but not of their enphyteutic censuses, in an area so strongly feudalized since the Late Middle Ages, plunged Andalusia into great economic instability, to which was added the political problem of caciquismo, which gave rise to anarchist movement among the working classes, whose most classic and disputed example is the Mano Negra affair.

=== 20th Century ===
The rebel army managed to control the coast of Cadiz and the cities of Seville, Cordoba and Granada in the uprising that started the Civil War

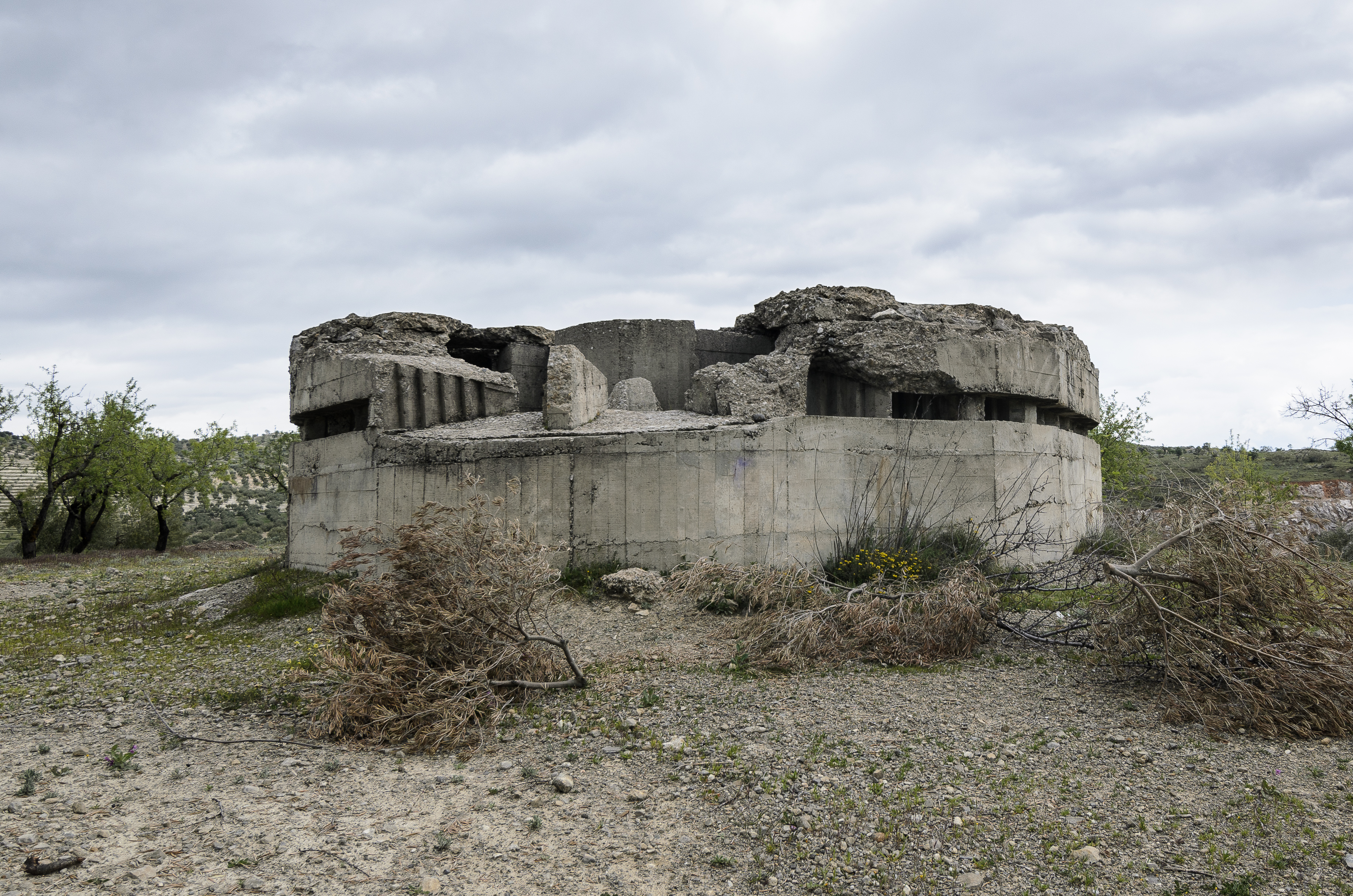
Remains of a fortification in the front of Luque (Córdoba)

By the end of 1937 two thirds of Andalusia was already under the control of the rebels

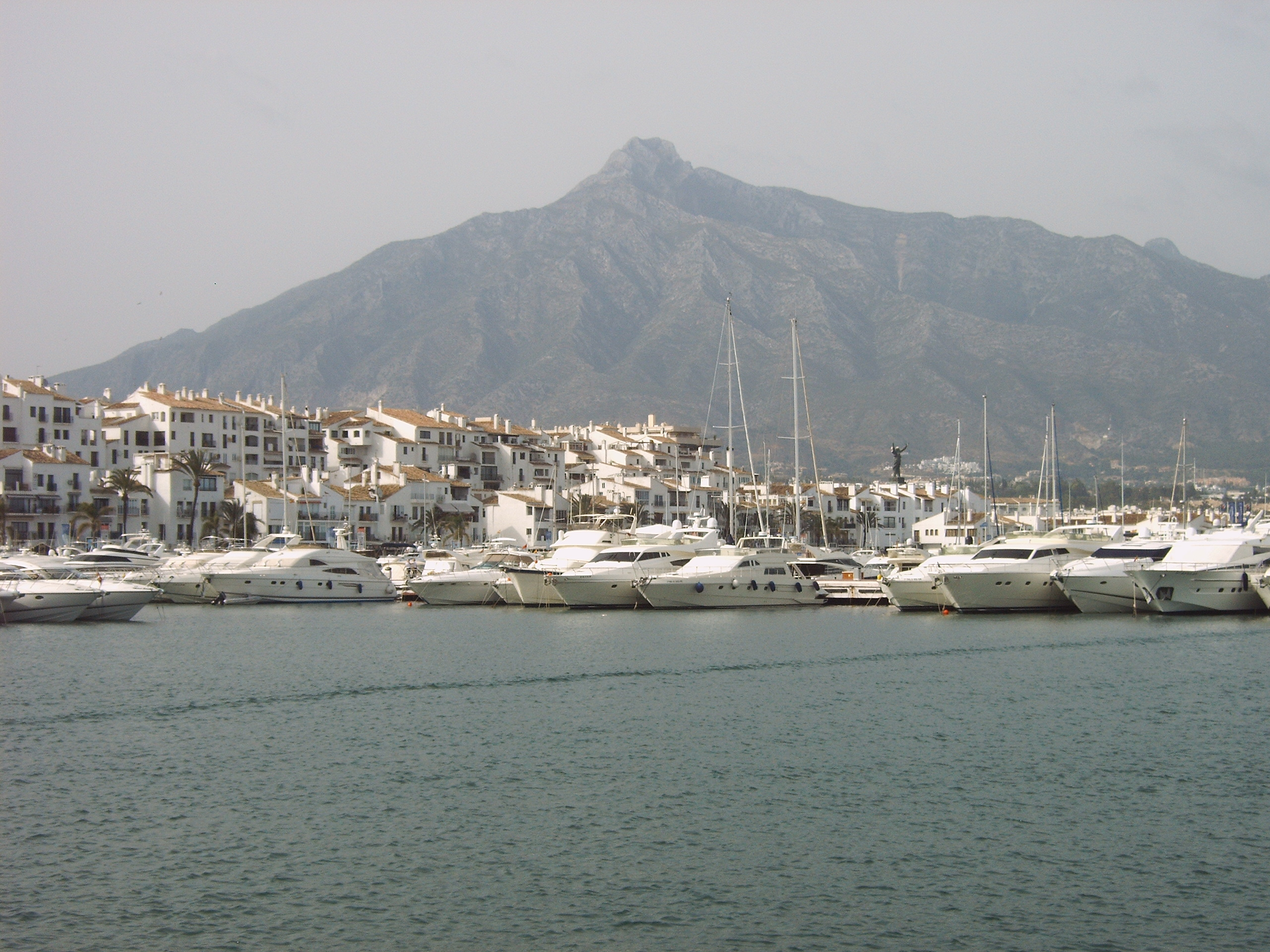
View of Puerto Banús, in Marbella (Costa del Sol).

During the reign of Alfonso XIII, within the postulates of regenerationism, a minor Andalusian regionalism emerged. The dictatorship of Primo de Rivera, between 1923 and 1930, brought some improvements for Andalusia, highlighting the decline of caciquismo. The municipal elections of 1931, in Andalusia as in the rest of Spain, were a clear victory for the Republican party, whose representation in the city councils led to the proclamation of the Second Spanish Republic that same year. The Republic was a period of great political instability, in which the great problems of Andalusia were not solved, among them the Agrarian reform and illiteracy. The Casas Viejas incident is an example of the Andalusian discontent with the government of the Republic. Despite some minority attempts, Andalusia did not accede in this period to have the political autonomy made possible by the constitution of 1931.

The outbreak of the Civil War in Andalusia had unequal consequences. While most of Western Andalusia fell immediately into the hands of the rebel side, Eastern Andalusia remained under Republican rule for most of the war. On the strictly warlike level, the civil war in Andalusia was reduced to minor battles, however the shootings and repression were abundant. The Franco's bombing of the Malaga coast and the German bombing of Almeria were especially dramatic.

During the post-war period and the establishment of Francoism until the beginning of the fifties, Andalusia suffered the consequences of rationing derived from the autarky of a military, repressive, dictatorial and centralist state. These were years of hunger and total lack of liberties.

From the 1950s onwards, slight changes took place in the Franco regime. The country was opening up to foreigners thanks to the development of tourism, initiated with the tourist boom of the Costa del Sol, and also by the departure of emigrants, who went both abroad and to other areas of the most industrialized Spain, especially to Germany and the region of Catalonia. Industry was also promoted through development plans, which included Sevilla and Huelva in a first phase and Córdoba and Granada in a second phase. Road transport was improved and some highways and reservoirs were built. This opening to the exterior and the reactivation of the economy were accompanied by a growing opposition movement to the regime, which, however, did not achieve the democratic transition in Spain until the death of the dictator Francisco Franco in 1975.

==== Autonomous Community of Andalusia ====
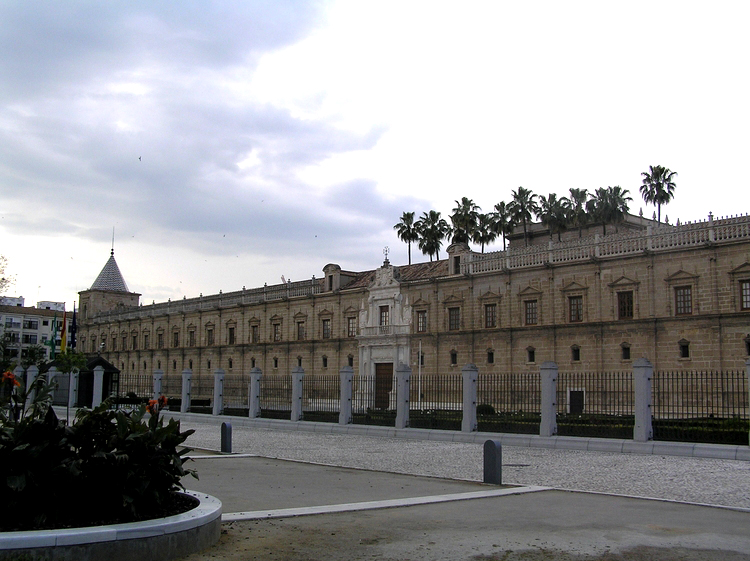
Hospital de las Cinco Llagas, in Seville, seat of the Parliament of Andalusia

The democratic transition, through the formula of the parliamentary monarchy, was widely supported in Andalusia. On 4 December 1977, nearly two million Andalusians demonstrated throughout the country in favor of political autonomy for the region. During the demonstration in Malaga, nineteen-year-old demonstrator Manuel José García Caparrós was killed by the police. In 1978 a provisional autonomous government led by Plácido Fernández Viagas and that same year the new Spanish constitution was enacted, which established the ways for the creation of a decentralized state through the autonomous communities.

The autonomic process began in Andalusia with discrepancies between the Pre-autonomic Board and the government of the nation, in the hands of the UCD. The central government wanted to grant Andalusia the reduced autonomy contained in article 143 of the constitution. This article allowed fast-track access to autonomy to the regions of Spain that had not approved statute of Autonomy during the Second Republic and that, therefore, were not considered "historical communities". However, the Junta Preautonómica de Andalucía pursued full autonomy and therefore opted for the path of Article 151, which had been introduced in the constitutional text mainly by the intervention of Manuel Clavero Arévalo.

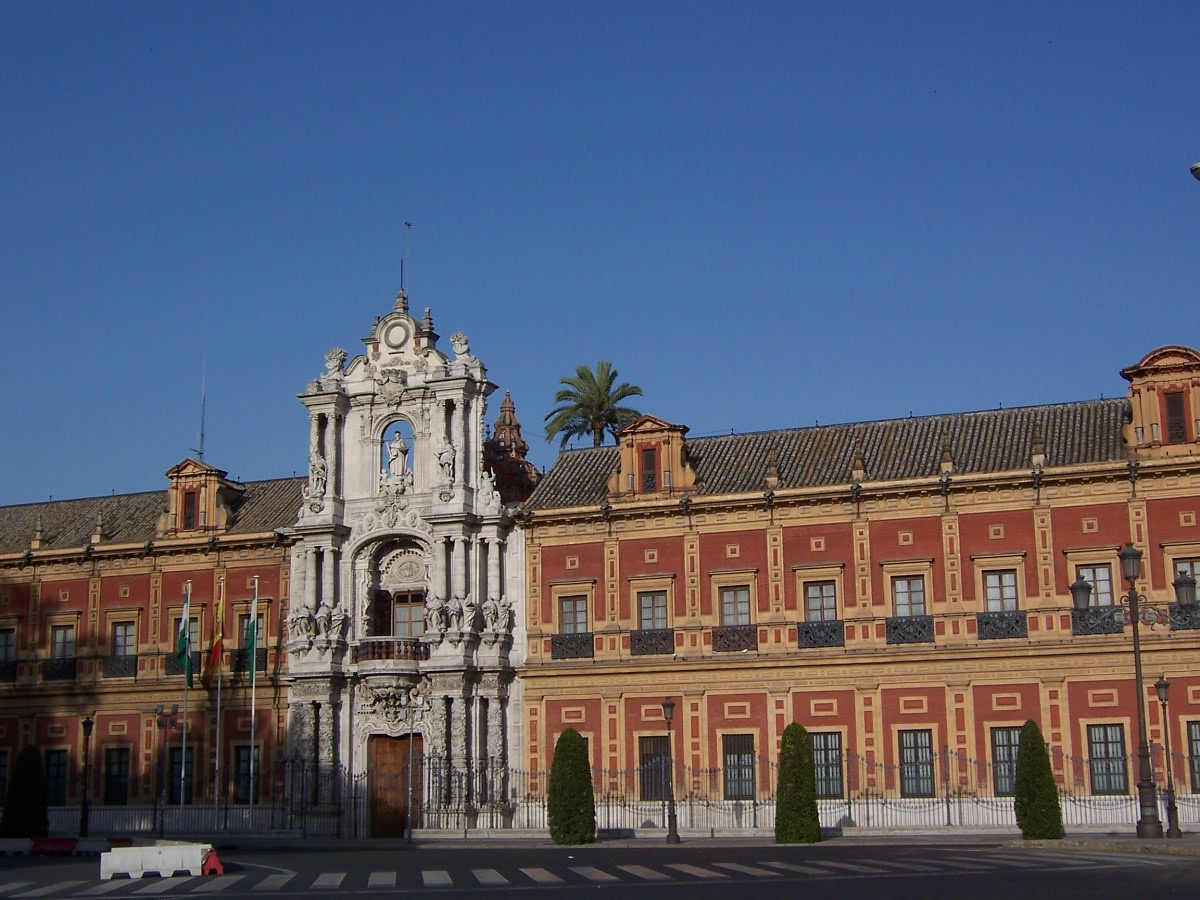
Palacio de San Telmo, in Seville, seat of the Presidency of the Junta de Andalucía

In the referendum of 28 February 1980, and despite the campaigns of the central government to hinder its approval, the majority of Andalusians decided that Andalusia should have full autonomy, through the restrictive procedure expressed in article 151, which makes it the only Spanish autonomous community that acceded to autonomy through that procedure. Finally in 1981, the Statute of Autonomy of Andalusia, known by the nickname of "Estatuto de Carmona", was approved by referendum, by which the region was constituted as an autonomous community under the provisions of the second article of the Spanish Constitution of 1978, which recognizes and guarantees the right to autonomy of the Spanish nationalities and regions.

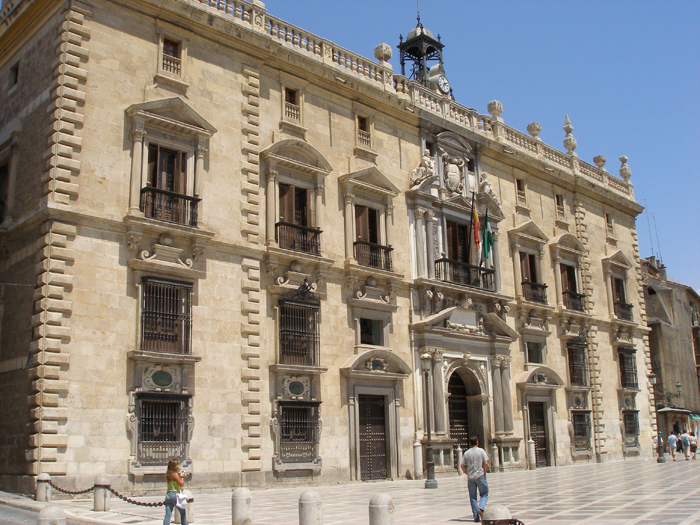
Royal Chancellery of Granada, seat of the Tribunal Superior de Justicia de Andalucía, in Granada

After the autonomous process and the entry of Spain in 1986 into the European Economic Community, later European Union, Andalusia entered a period of slow recovery, benefiting extensively from the European Regional Development Fund (ERDF) and the Plan de Empleo Rural (PER). Since its creation, the government of the Junta de Andalucía has been led by the PSOE, with Rafael Escuredo, José Rodríguez de la Borbolla, Manuel Chaves, José Antonio Griñán and Susana Díaz as presidents. During this period, public services and basic infrastructures have been expanded. In 1992 a high speed railroad line was inaugurated between Seville and Madrid, on the occasion of the Universal Exposition of Seville, which was a milestone in the improvement of communications in that province. Tourism has also been boosted, and other events of international importance have been held, such as the Mediterranean Games in Almería or the FIS Alpine World Ski Championships 1996 in Sierra Nevada.

=== 21st Century ===
In 2007, the Statute of Autonomy of Andalusia was reformed, the preamble of which states, firstly, that in the 1919 Andalusian Manifesto Andalusia was described as a national reality, to continue stating its current status as a nationality within the indissoluble unity of Spanish nation. Subsequently, in its articles, it defines itself, more specifically, as historical nationality, unlike the previous statute (1981) where it was defined, simply, as nationality. This new statute opens the way to greater levels of autonomy.

Despite the millions in economic aid, via subsidies, granted by the EU in recent decades, Andalusia's per capita income is still well below the Spanish and European average. Although its economic growth in certain years has been higher than the national average, it has remained far from convergence with the rest of Spain and Europe; even after the economic crisis of 2008-2013, income per capita indexes have worsened, since the destruction of wealth in Andalusia has been greater than in other regions of Spain.

The Andalusian economy has hardly diversified, since the primary sector has too much weight and, although the secondary sector is underdeveloped, there has been a strong tertiarization. There have also been serious cases of political and urban corruption in town halls and governmental institutions, such as the Malaya case, the Operation Malaya or the ERE affair.

After the 2008-2013 economic crisis, Andalusia topped the unemployment ranking of the entire European Union, reaching a figure close to 36% in 2012.
