= Hispania =

Roman province (218 BC – 472 AD)

Coordinates: 40.21°N 4.35°W

Hispania Ἱσπανία (Ancient Greek)
- 218 BC–472
- Timeline of the Roman conquest of Hispania (220 BC–19 BC), with Roman provincial boundaries shown
- Capital: Hispania Tarraconensis: Tarraco Hispania Baetica: Corduba Hispania Lusitania: Emerita Augusta
- Common languages: Latin, various Paleohispanic languages
- Religion: Traditional indigenous and Roman religion, followed by Christianity
- Government: Autocracy
- Emperor
  - AD 98 – AD 117: Trajan
  - AD 117 – AD 138: Hadrian
  - AD 379 – AD 395: Theodosius I
- Legislature: Roman Senate
- Historical era: Classical antiquity
  - Established: 218 BC
  - Disestablished: 472

Population
- 5,000,000 or more
Preceded by
Carthaginian Iberia
Succeeded by
Visigothic Kingdom
Kingdom of the Suebi
Spania
- Today part of: Spain; Portugal

Hispania (Note: Ancient Greek: Ἱσπανία, romanized: Hispanía; Latin: Hispānia Latin pronunciation: [hɪsˈpaːnia]) was the Roman name for the Iberian Peninsula. Under the Roman Republic, it was divided into two provinces: Hispania Citerior and Hispania Ulterior. During the Roman Empire, under the Principate, Hispania Ulterior was subdivided into Baetica and Lusitania, while Hispania Citerior was reorganized as Hispania Tarraconensis.

Beginning with Diocletian’s Tetrarchy (AD 293), the territory of Tarraconensis was further divided to create the provinces of Carthaginensis and Gallaecia (also called Callaecia, the origin of the name of modern Galicia). All the Hispanic provinces on the mainland, together with the Balearic Islands and the North African province of Mauretania Tingitana, were later organized into the Diocesis Hispaniarum, governed by a vicarius.

The name Hispania was also used in the period of Visigothic rule. The modern place names of Spain and Hispaniola are both derived from Hispania.

== Etymology ==
The origin of the Ancient Roman word Hispania is unknown. The evidence for the various speculations is based merely upon what are at best mere resemblances, likely to be accidental, and suspect supporting evidence.

The Phoenicians referred to the region as i-shphan-im possibly meaning "land of rabbits or hyraxes", "land of metals", "northern island", or "lowland". Roman coins struck in the region from the reign of Hadrian show a female figure with a rabbit at her feet, and Strabo called it the "land of the rabbits". Isidore of Sevilla considered Hispania of Iberian origin and derived it from the pre-Roman name for Seville, Hispalis. This was revived for instance by the etymologist Eric Partridge (in his work Origins) who felt that this might strongly hint at an ancient name for the country of *Hispa, presumably an Iberian or Celtic root whose meaning is now lost. Hispalis may alternatively derive from Heliopolis (Greek for 'city of the sun'). Occasionally Hispania was called Hesperia ultima 'farthest western land' by Roman writers since the name Hesperia 'western land' had already been used by the Greeks to refer to the Italian peninsula.

During the 18th and 19th centuries, Jesuits scholars like Larramendi and José Francisco de Isla tied the name to the Basque word ezpain 'lip', but also 'border, edge', thus meaning the farthest area or place.

During Antiquity and Middle Ages, the literary texts derive the term Hispania from an eponymous hero named Hispan, who is mentioned for the first time in the work of the Roman historian Gnaeus Pompeius Trogus, in the 1st century BC.

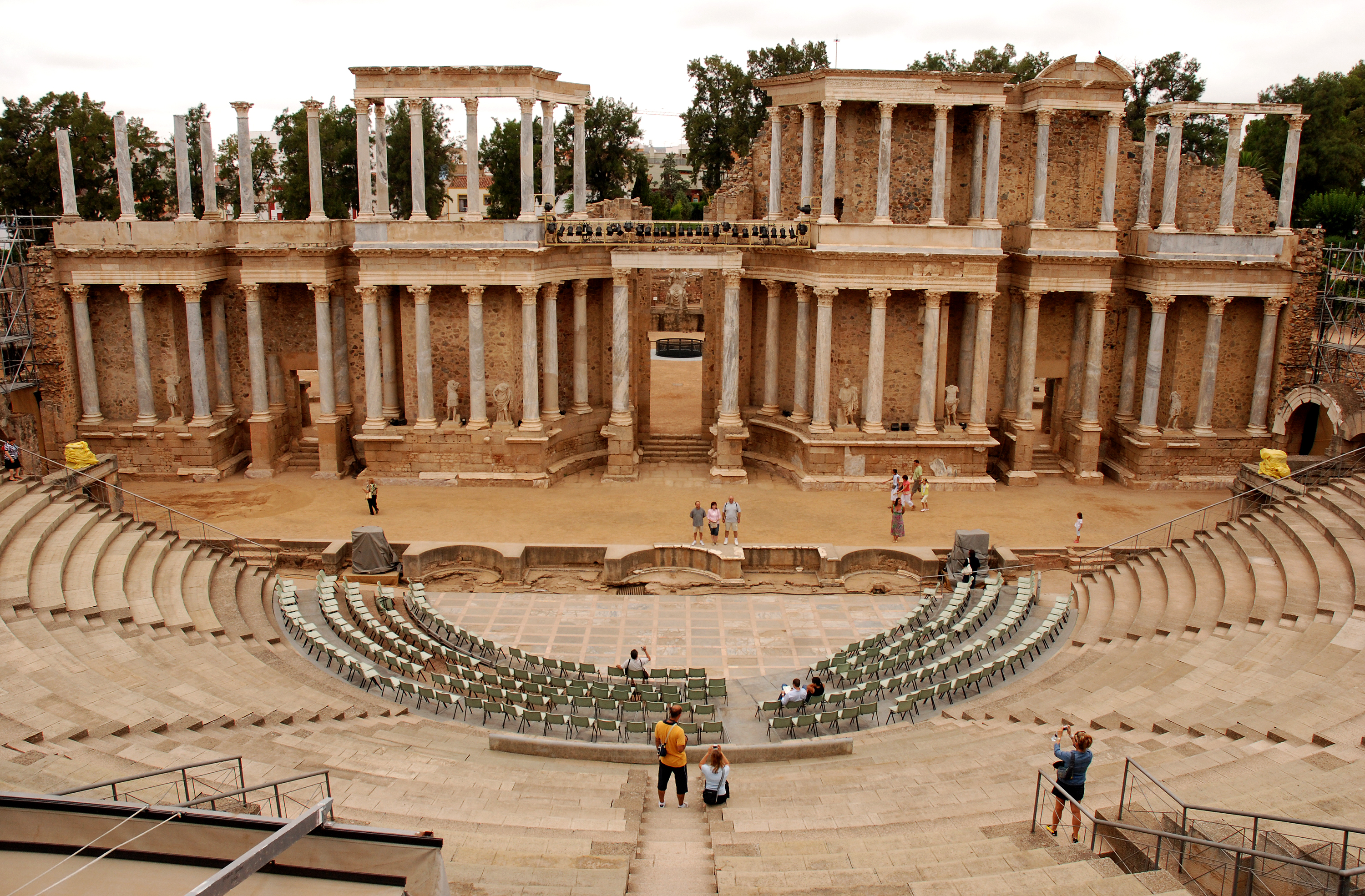
Archaeological Roman Ensemble of Mérida (Emerita Augusta), Extremadura, Spain.

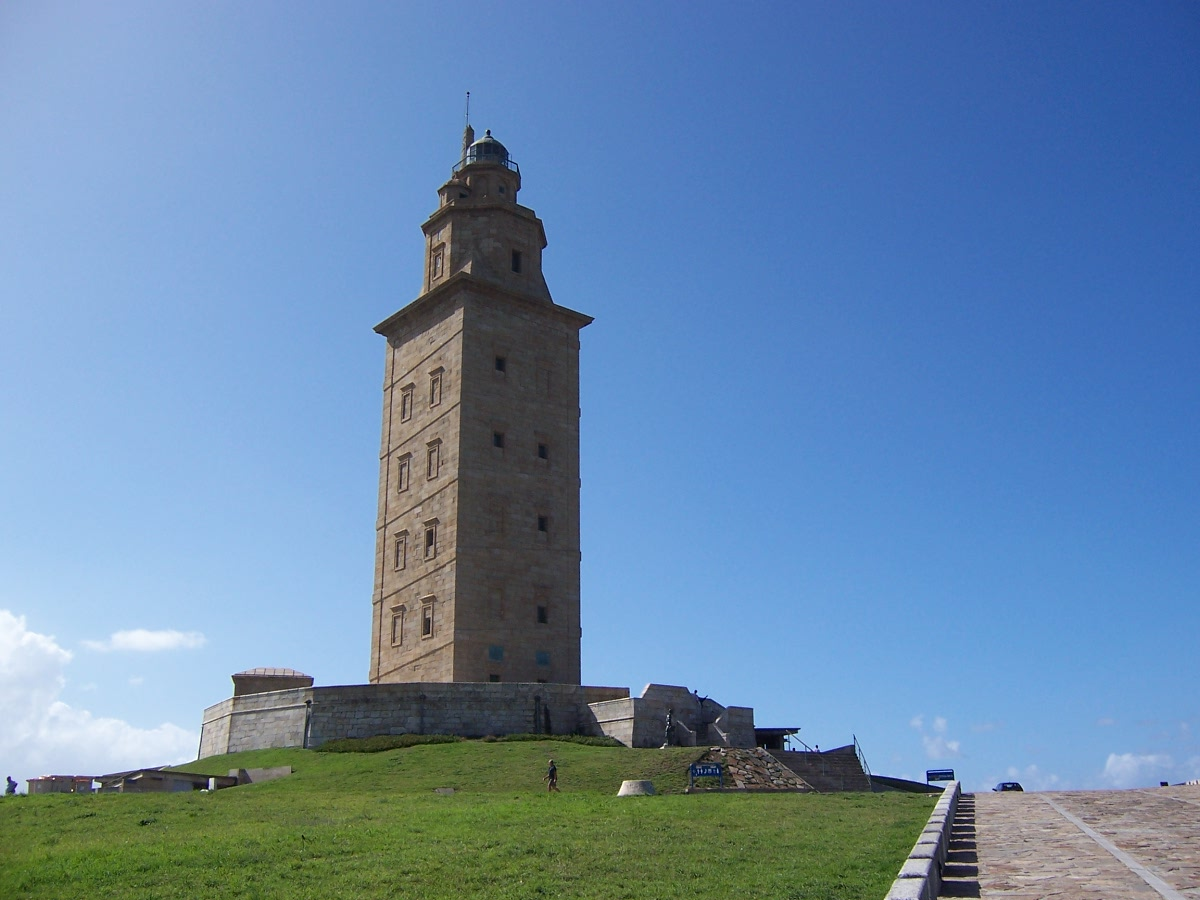
The Roman Tower of Hercules is the oldest surviving Roman lighthouse

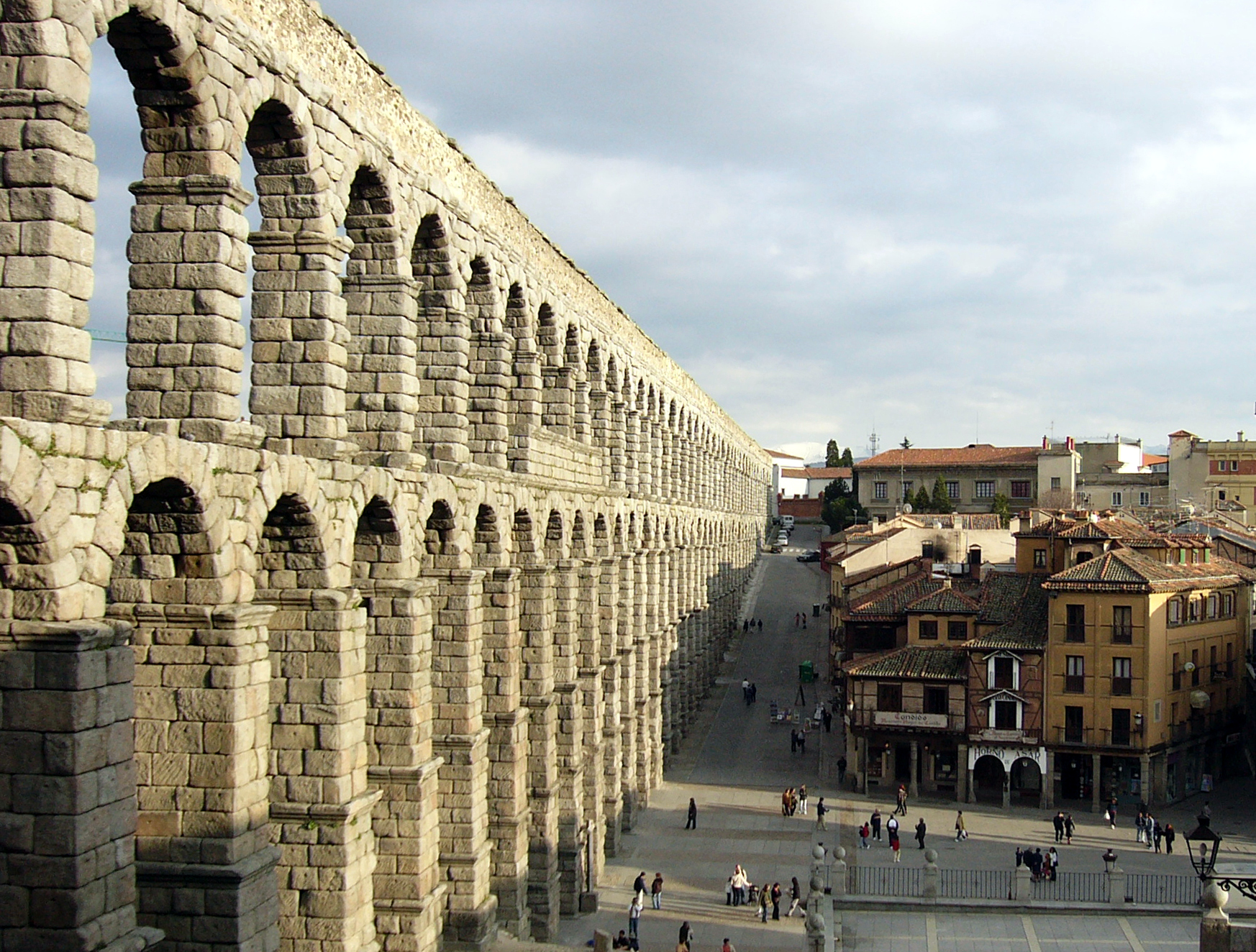
The Roman Aqueduct of Segovia, Castile, Spain.

The Roman Temple of Évora (Liberatias Iulia), Alentejo, Portugal

Hispania is the Latin root for the modern name Spain, and the words Spanish for Hispanicus or Hispanic, or Spain for Hispania, can be interchangeable, depending on context. The Estoria de España ('The History of Spain') written on the initiative of Alfonso X of Castile El Sabio ('the Wise'), between 1260 and 1274, during the Reconquista ('reconquest') of Spain, is believed to be the first extended history of Spain in Old Castilian using the words España ('Spain') and Españoles ('Spaniards') to refer to Medieval Hispania. The use of Latin Hispania, Castilian España, Catalan Espanya and Old French Espaigne, among others, to refer to Roman Hispania or Visigothic Hispania was common throughout all the Late Middle Ages.

A document dated 1292 mentions the names of foreigners from Medieval Spain as Gracien d'Espaigne. Latin expressions using Hispania or Hispaniae (e.g. omnes reges Hispaniae) were often used in the Middle Ages, while the Spain Romance languages of the Reconquista use the Romance version interchangeably. In the James Ist Chronicle Llibre dels fets, written between 1208 and 1276, there are many instances of this. (Note: When it talks about the different Kings, "los V regnes de Espanya" ("The 5 Kingdoms of Spain"); when it talks about a military fort built by the Christians saying that it is "de los meylors de Espanya" ("from the best of Spain"); when it declared that Catalonia, one of the integral parts of the Crown of Aragon, is "lo meylor Regne Despanya, el pus honrat, el pus noble" ("the best kingdom of Spain, the most honest, the most noble"); when it talks about the conflict that has existed for long "entre los sarrains e los chrestians, en Espanya" ("between Saracens and Christians, in Spain").) The borders of modern Spain do not coincide with those of the Roman province of Hispania or of the Visigothic Kingdom, and thus medieval Spain and modern Spain exist in separate contexts.

The Latin term Hispania, often used during Antiquity and the Low Middle Ages, like with Roman Hispania, as a geographical and political name, continued to be used geographically and politically in the Visigothic Spania, as shown in the expression laus Hispaniae, 'Praise to Hispania', to describe the history of the peoples of the Iberian Peninsula of Isidore of Seville's Historia de regibus Gothorum, Vandalorum et Suevorum:

You are, O Spain, holy and always happy mother of princes and peoples, the most beautiful of all the lands that extend far from the West to India. You, by right, are now the queen of all provinces, from whom the lights are given not only the sunset, but also the East. You are the honor and ornament of the orb and the most illustrious portion of the Earth ... And for this reason, long ago, the golden Rome desired you

In modern history, Spain and Spanish have become increasingly associated with the Kingdom of Spain alone, although this process took several centuries. After the union of the central peninsular Kingdom of Castile with the eastern peninsular Kingdom of Aragon in the 15th century under the Catholic Monarchs in 1492, only Navarra and Portugal were left to complete the whole peninsula under one monarchy. Navarre followed soon after in 1512, and Portugal, after over 400 years as an independent and sovereign nation, in 1580. During this time, the concept of Spain was still unchanged. It was after the restoration of Portugal's independence in 1640 when the concept of Spain started to shift and be applied to all the Peninsula except Portugal.

== Languages ==
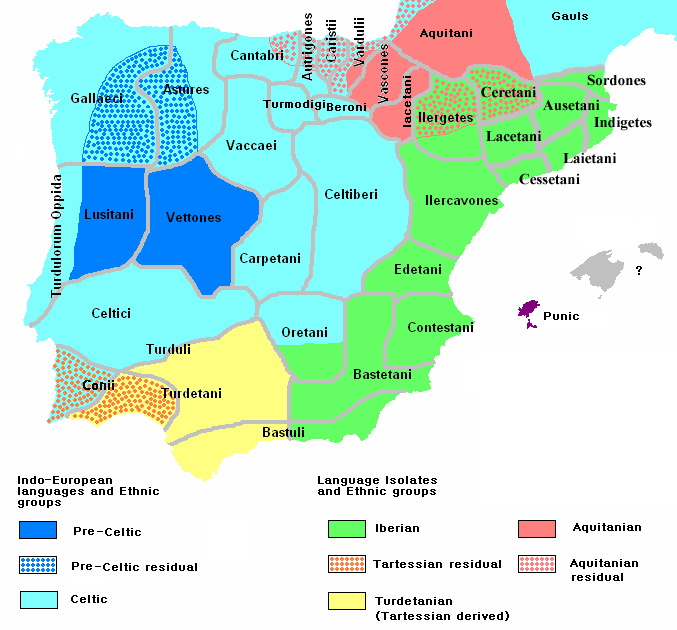
Linguistic map: This shows the Linguistic variation of the Iberian Peninsula at about 200 BC (at the end of the Second Punic War).

Latin was the official language of Hispania during Roman rule, which exceeded 600 years. After the fall of Rome and the invasion of the Germanic Visigoths and Suebi, Latin was spoken by nearly all of the population, but in its common form known as Vulgar Latin, and the regional changes which led to the modern Iberian Romance languages had already begun.

== History ==
=== Background ===
The Iberian Peninsula has long been inhabited, first by early hominids such as Homo erectus, Homo heidelbergensis and Homo antecessor. In the Paleolithic period, the Neanderthals entered Iberia and eventually took refuge from the advancing migrations of modern humans. In the 40th millennium BC, during the Upper Paleolithic and the last ice age, the first large settlement of Europe by modern humans occurred. These were nomadic hunter-gatherers originating on the steppes of Central Asia. When the last ice age reached its maximum extent, during the 30th millennium BC, these modern humans took refuge in Southern Europe, namely in Iberia, after retreating through Southern France. In the millennia that followed, the Neanderthals became extinct and local modern human cultures thrived, producing pre-historic art such as that found in L'Arbreda Cave and in the Côa Valley.

In the Mesolithic period, beginning in the 10th millennium BC, the Allerød Oscillation occurred. This was an interstadial deglaciation that lessened the harsh conditions of the Ice Age. The populations sheltered in Iberian Peninsula (descendants of the Cro-Magnon) migrated and recolonized all of Western Europe. In this period one finds the Azilian culture in Southern France and Northern Iberia (to the mouth of the Douro river), as well as the Muge Culture in the Tagus valley.

The Neolithic brought changes to the human landscape of Iberia (from the 5th millennium BC onwards), with the development of agriculture and the beginning of the European Megalith Culture. This spread to most of Europe and had one of its oldest and main centres in the territory of modern Portugal, as well as the Chalcolithic and Beaker cultures.

During the 1st millennium BC, in the Bronze Age, the first wave of migrations into Iberia of speakers of Indo-European languages occurred. These were later (7th and 5th centuries BC) followed by others that can be identified as Celts. Eventually urban cultures developed in southern Iberia, such as Tartessos, influenced by the Phoenician colonization of coastal Mediterranean Iberia, with strong competition from the Greek colonization. These two processes defined Iberia's cultural landscape – Mediterranean towards the southeast and Continental in the northwest.

=== Roman conquest ===
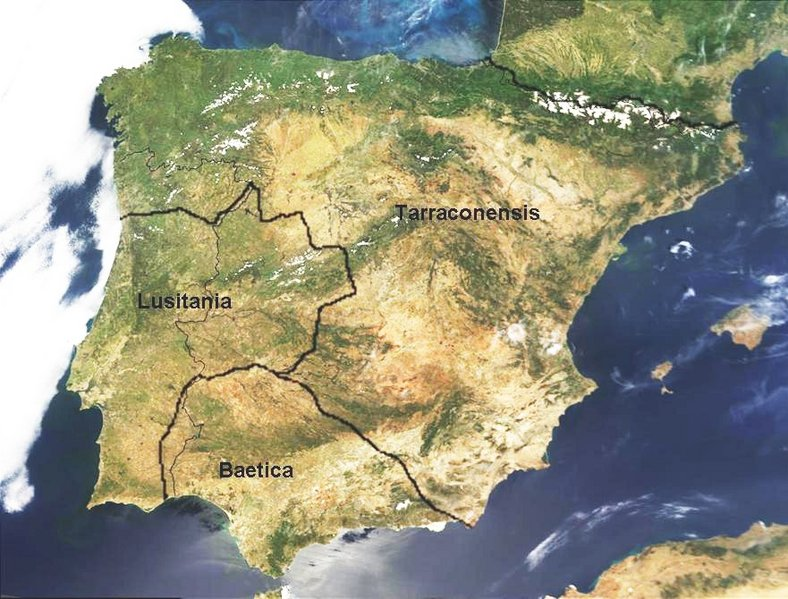
Hispania under Caesar Augustus's rule after the Cantabrian Wars in 29 BC

Roman armies invaded the Iberian Peninsula in 218 BC and used it as a training ground for officers and as a proving ground for tactics during campaigns against the Carthaginians, the Iberians, the Lusitanians, the Gallaecians and other Celts. It was not until 19 BC that the Roman emperor Augustus (r. 27 BC–AD 14) was able to complete the conquest (see Cantabrian Wars). Until then, much of Hispania remained autonomous.

Romanization proceeded quickly in some regions where there are references to the togati, and very slowly in others, after the time of Augustus, and Hispania was divided into three separately governed provinces, and nine provinces by the 4th century. More importantly, Hispania was for 500 years part of a cosmopolitan world empire bound together by law, language, and the Roman road. But the impact of Hispania on the newcomers was also substantial. Caesar wrote that the soldiers from the Second Legion had become Hispanicized and regarded themselves as hispanici.

=== Roman rule ===
Some of the peninsula's population were admitted into the Roman aristocratic class and they participated in governing Hispania and the Roman Empire, although there was a native aristocracy class who ruled each local tribe. The latifundia (sing., latifundium), large estates controlled by the aristocracy, were superimposed on the existing Iberian landholding system.

The Romans improved existing cities, such as Lisbon (Olissipo) and Tarragona (Tarraco), established Zaragoza (Caesaraugusta), Mérida (Augusta Emerita), and Valencia (Valentia), and reduced other native cities to mere villages. The peninsula's economy expanded under Roman tutelage. Hispania served as a granary and a major source of metals for the Roman market, and its harbors exported gold, tin, silver, lead, wool, wheat, olive oil, wine, fish, and garum. Agricultural production increased with the introduction of irrigation projects, some of which remain in use today. The Romanized Iberian populations and the Iberian-born descendants of Roman soldiers and colonists had all achieved the status of full Roman citizenship by the end of the 1st century. The Iberian denarii, also called argentum oscense by Roman soldiers, circulated until the 1st century BC, after which it was replaced by Roman coins.

Hispania was separated into two provinces (in 197 BC), each ruled by a praetor: Hispania Citerior ("Hither Hispania") and Hispania Ulterior ("Farther Hispania"). The long wars of conquest lasted two centuries, and only by the time of Augustus did Rome manage to control Hispania Ulterior. Hispania was divided into three provinces in the 1st century BC. In the imperial era, three Roman emperors were born in Hispania: Trajan (r. 98–117), Hadrian (r. 117–138), and Theodosius (r. 379–395).

In the 4th century, Latinius Pacatus Drepanius, a Gallic rhetorician, dedicated part of his work to the depiction of the geography, climate and inhabitants of the peninsula, writing:

This Hispania produces tough soldiers, very skilled captains, prolific speakers, luminous bards. It is a mother of judges and princes; it has given Trajan, Hadrian, and Theodosius to the Empire.

Christianity was introduced into Hispania in the 1st century, and it became popular in the cities in the 2nd century. However, little headway was made in the countryside, until the late 4th century, by which time Christianity was the official religion of the Roman Empire. Some heretical sects emerged in Hispania, most notably Priscillianism, but overall the local bishops remained subordinate to the Pope. Bishops who had official civil as well as ecclesiastical status in the late empire continued to exercise their authority to maintain order when civil governments broke down there in the 5th century. The Council of Bishops became an important instrument of stability during the ascendancy of the Visigoths. The last vestiges of (Western·classical) Roman rule ended in 472.

=== Germanic conquest ===
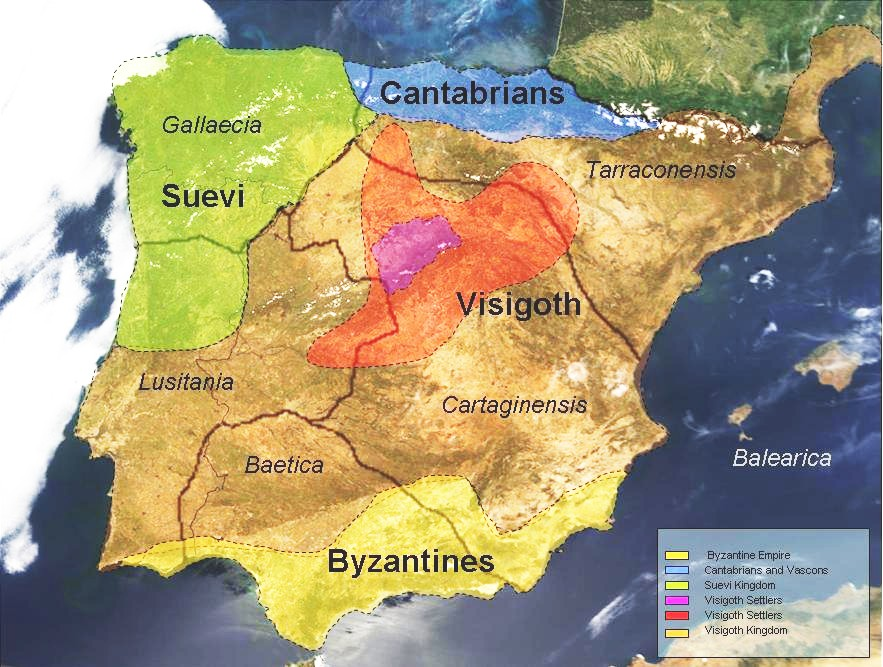
Iberian Peninsula (AD 530–AD 570)

The Iberian Peninsula in the year 560 AD

The undoing of Roman Spain was the result of four tribes crossing the Rhine in 406. After three years of depredation and wandering about northern and western Gaul, the Germanic Buri, Suevi and Vandals, together with the Sarmatian Alans moved into Iberia in September or October 409 at the request of Gerontius, a Roman usurper. The Suevi established a kingdom in Gallaecia in what is today modern Galicia and northern Portugal. The Alans' allies, the Hasdingi Vandals, also established a kingdom in another part of Gallaecia. The Alans established a kingdom in Lusitania – modern Alentejo and Algarve, in Portugal. The Silingi Vandals briefly occupied parts of South Iberia in the province of Baetica.

In an effort to retrieve the region, the Western Roman emperor, Honorius (r. 395–423), promised the Visigoths a home in southwest Gaul if they destroyed the invaders in Spain. They all but wiped out the Silingi and Alans. The remnant joined the Asding Vandals who had settled first in the northwest with the Sueves but south to Baetica. It is a mystery why the Visigoths were recalled by patrician Constantius (who in 418 married Honorius' sister who had been married briefly to the Visigothic king Ataulf). The Visigoths, the remnants of the two tribes who joined them and the Sueves were confined to a small area in the northwest of the peninsula. The diocese may even have been re-established with its capital at Mérida in 418. The Roman attempt under General Castorius to dislodge the Vandals from Cordoba failed in 422.

The Vandals and Alans crossed over to North Africa in 429, an event which is considered to have been decisive in hastening the decline of the Western Roman Empire. However, their departure allowed the Romans to recover 90% of the Iberian Peninsula until 439. After the departure of the Vandals only the Sueves remained in a northwest corner of the peninsula. Roman rule which had survived in the eastern quadrant was restored over most of Iberia until the Sueves occupied Mérida in 439, a move which coincides to the Vandal occupation of Carthage late the same year. Rome made attempts to restore control in 446 and 458. Success was temporary.

After the death of emperor Majorian in 461 Roman authority collapsed except in Tarraconensis the northeastern quadrant of the peninsula. The Visigoths, a Germanic people, whose kingdom was located in southwest Gaul, took the province when they occupied Tarragona in 472. They also confined the Sueves who had ruled most of the region to Galicia and northern Portugal. In 484 the Visigoths established Toledo as the capital of their kingdom. Successive Visigothic kings ruled Hispania as patricians who held imperial commissions to govern in the name of the Roman emperor. In 585 the Visigoths conquered the Suebic Kingdom of Galicia, and thus controlled almost all of Hispania.

A century later, taking advantage of a struggle for the throne between the Visigothic kings Agila and Athanagild, the Byzantine emperor Justinian I sent an army under the command of Liberius to take back the peninsula from the Visigoths. This short-lived reconquest recovered only a small strip of land along the Mediterranean coast roughly corresponding to the ancient province of Baetica, known as Spania.

Under the Visigoths, culture was not as highly developed as it had been under Roman rule, when a goal of higher education had been to prepare gentlemen to take their places in municipal and imperial administration. With the collapse of the imperial administrative super-structure above the provincial level (which was practically moribund) the task of maintaining formal education and government shifted to the Church from the old ruling class of educated aristocrats and gentry. The clergy, for the most part, emerged as the qualified personnel to manage higher administration in concert with local powerful notables who gradually displaced the old town councils. As elsewhere in early medieval Europe, the church in Hispania stood as society's most cohesive institution. The Visigoths are also responsible for the introduction of mainstream Christianity to the Iberian Peninsula; the earliest representation of Christ in Spanish religious art can be found in a Visigothic hermitage, Santa Maria de Lara. It also embodied the continuity of Roman order. Native Hispano-Romans continued to run the civil administration and Latin continued to be the language of government and of commerce on behalf of the Visigoths.

Religion was the most persistent source of friction between the Chalcedonian (Catholic) native Hispano-Romans and their Arian Visigothic overlords, whom the former considered heretical. At times this tension invited open rebellion, and restive factions within the Visigothic aristocracy exploited it to weaken the monarchy. In 589, Recared, a Visigothic ruler, renounced his Arianism before the Council of Bishops at Toledo and accepted Chalcedonian Christianity (Catholic Church), thus assuring an alliance between the Visigothic monarchy and the native Hispano-Romans. This alliance would not mark the last time in the history of the peninsula that political unity would be sought through religious unity.

Court ceremonials – from Constantinople – that proclaimed the imperial sovereignty and unity of the Visigothic state were introduced at Toledo. Still, civil war, royal assassinations, and usurpation were commonplace, and warlords and great landholders assumed wide discretionary powers. Bloody family feuds went unchecked. The Visigoths had acquired and cultivated the apparatus of the Roman state but not the ability to make it operate to their advantage. In the absence of a well-defined hereditary system of succession to the throne, rival factions encouraged foreign intervention by the Greeks, the Franks, and finally the Muslims in internal disputes and in royal elections.

According to Isidore of Seville, it is with the Visigothic domination of Iberia that the idea of a peninsular unity is sought after, and the phrase Mother Hispania is first spoken. Up to that date, Hispania designated all of the peninsula's lands. In Historia Gothorum, the Visigoth Suinthila appears as the first monarch under whose rule Hispania is dealt with as a Gothic nation.

== Administrative divisions ==
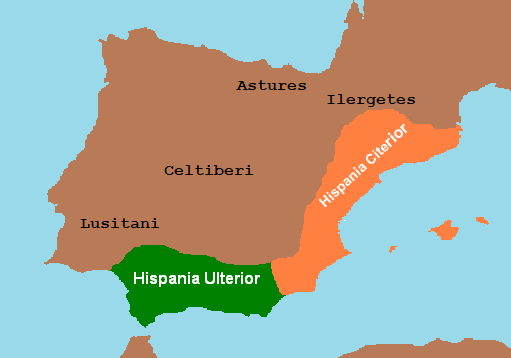
Hispania Ulterior and Citerior

During the first stages of Romanization, the peninsula was divided in two by the Romans for administrative purposes. The closest one to Rome was called Citerior and the more remote one Ulterior. The frontier between both was a sinuous line which ran from Cartago Nova (now Cartagena) to the Cantabrian Sea.

- Hispania Ulterior (comprised what are now Andalusia, Portugal, Extremadura, León, a great portion of the former Castilla la Vieja, Galicia, Asturias, and the Basque Country);
- Hispania Citerior (comprised the eastern part of former Castilla la Vieja, and what are now Aragon, Valencia, Catalonia, and a major part of former Castilla la Nueva).

Administrative organization of Hispania into Baetica, Lusitania and Hispania Citerior

In 27 BC, the general and politician Marcus Vipsanius Agrippa divided Hispania into three parts:

- Baetica (by division of Hispania Ulterior, approximately modern day Andalusia);
- Lusitania (by division of Hispania Ulterior, including Gallaecia and Asturias);
- Hispania Citerior (by attaching Cantabria and the Basque Country).

Administrative division of Hispania by Augustus in 27 BC

The emperor Augustus in that same year returned to make a new division leaving the provinces as follows:

- Provincia Hispania Ulterior Baetica (or Hispania Baetica), whose capital was Corduba, presently Córdoba. It included a little less territory than present-day Andalusia—since modern Almería and a great portion of what today is Granada and Jaén were left outside—plus the southern zone of present-day Badajoz. The river Anas or Annas (Guadiana, from Wadi-Anas) separated Hispania Baetica from Lusitania.
- Provincia Hispania Ulterior Lusitania (Lusitania), whose capital was Emerita Augusta (now Mérida) and without Gallaecia and Asturias.
- Provincia Hispania Citerior (or Tarraconensis), whose capital was Tarraco (Tarragona). After gaining maximum importance this province was simply known as Tarraconensis and it comprised Gallaecia (modern Galicia and northern Portugal) and Asturias.

By the 3rd century the emperor Caracalla made a new division which lasted only a short time. He split Hispania Citerior again into two parts, creating the new provinces Provincia Hispania Nova Citerior and Asturiae-Calleciae. In the year 238 the unified province Tarraconensis or Hispania Citerior was re-established.

In the 3rd century, under the Soldier Emperors, Hispania Nova (the northwestern corner of Spain) was split off from Tarraconensis, as a small province but the home of the only permanent legion in Hispania, Legio VII Gemina.

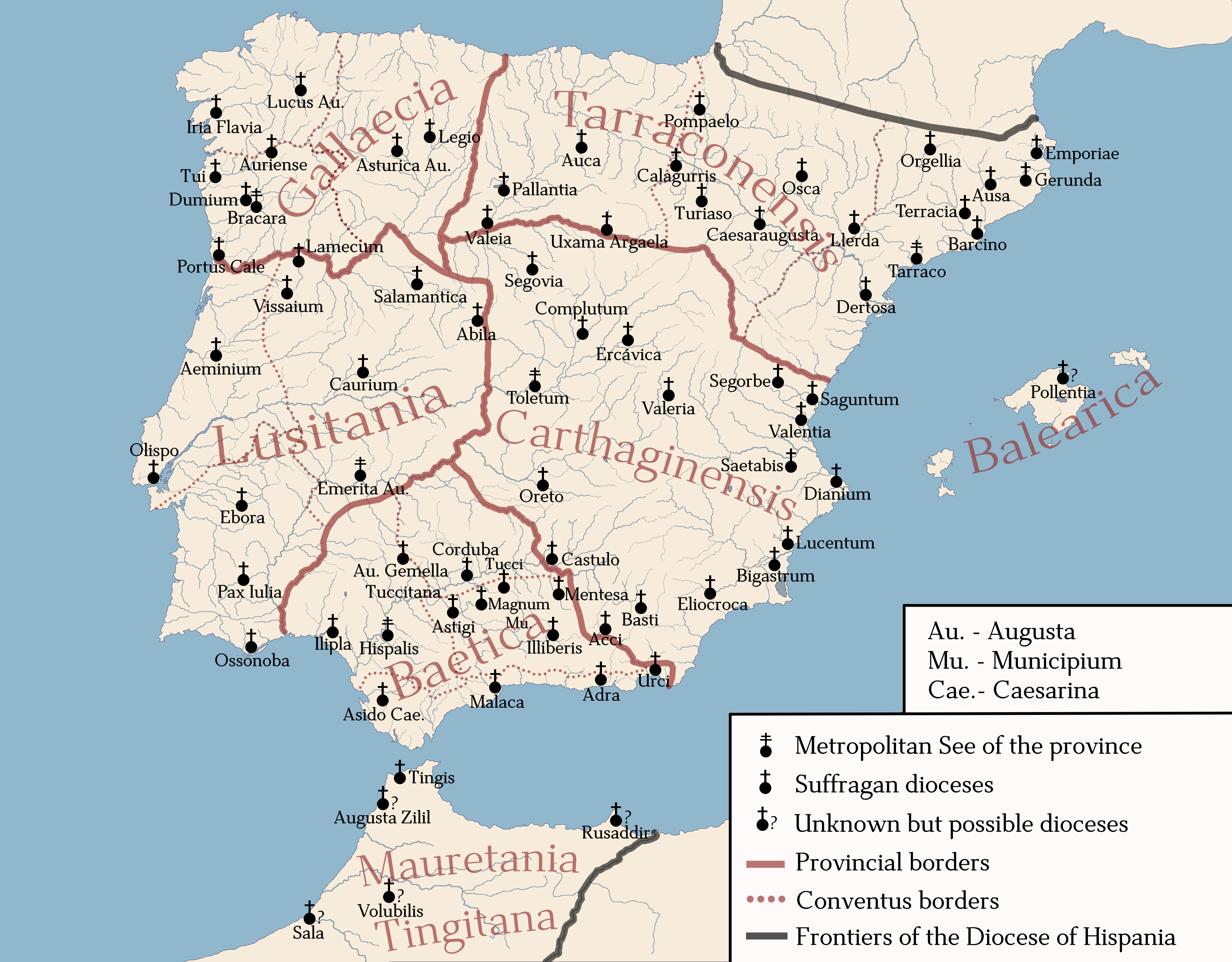
Diocese of Hispania after AD 293, highlighting its ecclesial metropolitan sees and their suffragan dioceses.

After Diocletian's Tetrarchy reform in AD 293, the new Diocese of Hispania became one of the four dioceses—governed by a vicarius—of the praetorian prefecture of Gaul (also comprising the provinces of Gaul, Germania and Britannia), after the abolition of the imperial Tetrarchs under the Western Emperor (in Rome itself, later Ravenna). The diocese, with its capital at Emerita Augusta (modern Mérida), comprised:

- Baetica (under a governor styled consularis);
- Gallaecia (under a governor styled consularis);
- Lusitania (under a governor styled consularis);
- Carthaginiensis (under a praeses);
- Tarraconensis (under a praeses);
- Insulae Baleares (which were detached from Tarraconensis during Diocletian's reign);
- Mauretania Tingitana (in North Africa).

== Economy ==
Before the Punic Wars, Hispania was a land with much untapped mineral and agricultural wealth, limited by the primitive subsistence economies of its native peoples outside of a few trading ports along the Mediterranean. Occupation by the Carthaginians and then by the Romans for its abundant silver deposits developed Hispania into a thriving multifaceted economy. Several metals, olives, oil from Baetica, salted fish and garum, and wines were some of the goods produced in Hispania and traded throughout the Empire. Gold mining was the most important activity in the north-west parts of the peninsula. This activity is attested in archaeological sites as Las Médulas (Spain) and Casais (Ponte de Lima, Portugal).

== Climate ==
Precipitation levels were unusually high during the so-called Iberian–Roman Humid Period. Roman Spain experienced its three phases: the most humid interval in 550–190 BC, an arid interval in 190 BC–150 AD and another humid period in 150–350. In 134 BC the army of Scipio Aemilianus in Spain had to march at night due to extreme heat, when some of its horses and mules died of thirst (even though earlier, in 181 BC, heavy spring rains prevented the Celtiberians from relieving the Roman siege of Contrebia). Through the 2nd century AD warm temperatures dominated particularly in the mountains along the north coast, punctuated by further cool spells from c. 155 to 180. After about 200 the temperatures fluctuated, trending toward cool.

== Sources and references ==
=== Modern sources in Spanish and Portuguese ===
- Alarcão, Jorge, O Domínio Romano em Portugal, Publicações Europa-América, 1988. (In Portuguese.)
- Altamira y Crevea, Rafael Historia de España y de la civilización española. Tomo I. Barcelona, 1900. Altamira was a professor at the University of Oviedo, a member of the Royal Academy of History, of the Geographic Society of Lisbon and of the Instituto de Coimbra. (In Spanish.)
- Bosch Gimpera, Pedro; Aguado Bleye, Pedro; and Ferrandis, José. Historia de España. España romana, I, created under the direction of Ramón Menéndez Pidal. Editorial Espasa-Calpe S.A., Madrid 1935. (In Spanish.)
- Camón Aznar, José, Las artes y los pueblos de la España primitiva. Editorial Espasa Calpe, S.A. Madrid, 1954. Camón was a professor at the University of Madrid. (In Spanish.)
- García y Bellido, Antonio, España y los españoles hace dos mil años (según la Geografía de Estrabón). Colección Austral de Espasa Calpe S.A., Madrid 1945 (1st ed. 8-XI-1945). García y Bellido was an archeologist and a professor at the University of Madrid. (In Spanish.)
- Mattoso, José (dir.), História de Portugal. Primeiro Volume: Antes de Portugal, Lisboa, Círculo de Leitores, 1992. (in Portuguese)
- Melón, Amando, Geografía histórica española Editorial Volvntad, S.A., Tomo primero, Vol. I Serie E. Madrid 1928. Melón was a member of the Royal Geographical Society of Madrid and a professor of geography at the Universities of Valladolid and Madrid. (In Spanish.)
- Pellón, José R., Diccionario Espasa Íberos. Espasa Calpe S.A. Madrid 2001. (In Spanish.)
- Urbieto Arteta, Antonio, Historia ilustrada de España, Volumen II. Editorial Debate, Madrid 1994. (In Spanish.)
- El Housin Helal Ouriachen, 2009, La ciudad bética durante la Antigüedad Tardía. Persistencias y mutaciones locales en relación con la realidad urbana del Mediterraneo y del Atlántico, Tesis doctoral, Universidad de Granada, Granada.

=== Other modern sources ===
- This article draws heavily on the corresponding article in the Spanish-language Wikipedia, which was accessed in the version of 27 February 2005.
- Westermann Grosser Atlas zur Weltgeschichte (in German)
- Hispania

=== Classical sources ===
- The notitia dignitatum (c. AD 400; one edition online is Notitia Dignitatum: text - IntraText CT)

Other classical sources have been accessed second-hand (see references above):

- Strabo, Geographiká. Book III, Iberia, written between the years 29 and 7 BC and touched up in AD 18. The most prestigious and widely used edition is Karl Müller's, published in Paris at the end of the 19th century, one volume, with 2 columns, Greek and Latin. The most reputed French translation is Tardieu, París 1886. The most reputed English translation (with Greek text) is H.L. Jones, vol. I–VIII, London 1917ff., ND London 1931ff.
- Ptolemy (Greek astronomer of the 2nd century) Geographiké Hyphaégesis, geographic guidebook.
- Pacatus (Gallic rhetorician) directed a panegyric on Hispania to the emperor Theodosius I in 389, which he read to the Senate.
- Paulus Orosius (390–418) historian, follower of Saint Augustine and author of Historiae adversus paganos, the first Christian universal history, and of Hispania Universa, an historical guide translated into Anglo-Saxon by Alfred the Great and into Arabic by Abd-ar-Rahman III.
- Lucius Anneus Florus (between 1st and 2nd century). Compendium of Roman History and Epitome of the History of Titus Livius (Livy). The relevant texts of Livy have been lost, but we can read them via Florus.
- Trogus Pompeius. Believed to be a Gaul with Roman citizenship. Historia universal written in Latin in the times of Augustus Caesar.
- Titus Livius (Livy) (59 BC–17 BC). Ab urbe condita, Book CXLII of Livy's surviving work.

== See also ==
- Alans in Hispania
- Carthaginian Iberia
- Celtiberians
  - Celtiberian language
  - Celtiberian script
- Hispania Baetica
- Hispania Citerior
- Hispania Gallaecia
- Hispania Tarraconensis
- Hispania Ulterior
- Iberians
- Iberian languages (all past and present languages spoken in Iberia)
  - Greco-Iberian alphabet
  - Hispano-Celtic languages
  - Iberian scripts
    - Northeastern Iberian script
    - Southeastern Iberian script
  - Paleohispanic languages
    - Paleohispanic scripts
  - Tartessian language
- List of Roman sites in Spain
- Lusitania
  - Lusitanians
  - Lusitanian language
  - Lusitanian mythology
- Muslim-occupied Medieval Iberia
  - Christian reconquest of Medieval Iberia
  - History of Andalucía
  - Timeline of the Muslim presence in the Iberian Peninsula
  - Umayyad conquest of Hispania
- Ophiussa
  - Oestriminis
- Portugal
  - History of Portugal
  - Timeline of Portuguese history
- Pre-Roman peoples of the Iberian Peninsula
  - Cynetes
  - Tartessos (early Iberian civilization)
- Spain
  - History of Spain
  - Timeline of Spanish history
- Suebic Kingdom of Galicia
- Vandals in Hispania
- Visigothic Kingdom of Hispania
