= Baeza =

Baeza may refer to:

- Baeza, Ecuador
- Baeza, Spain
  - University of Baeza
  - Baeza Cathedral
  - Baeza CF, a football club from the city
- Brusqeulia baeza, a species of moth

== People ==
- Baeza (rapper) (born 1993), American rapper, singer, actor, hip hop producer, and songwriter
- Acario Cotapos Baeza (1889–1969), Chilean composer
- Alberto Baeza (born 1938), Mexican football player
- Alberto Baeza Flores (1914–1998), Chilean poet, writer, and journalist
- Alberto Campo Baeza (born 1946), Spanish architect
- Braulio Baeza (born 1940), American jockey
- Braulio Baeza (footballer) (born 1990)
- Claudio Baeza (born 1993), Chilean football player
- Ezequiel Baeza (born 1944), Chilean long-distance runner
- Fernando Baeza Meléndez (born 1942), Mexican politician
- Francisco Martínez de Baeza, colonial governor of New Mexico
- Frutos Baeza (1861–1918), Spanish poet and writer
- Gaspar de Baeza (1540–1569), Spanish humanist, lawyer, translator and writer
- Héctor González Baeza (born 1986), Spanish road racing cyclist
- Jaime Baeza (born 1958), Chilean football player
- Jean Baeza (1942–2011), French football player
- José Delicado Baeza (1927–2014), Roman Catholic archbishop
- José Eusebio Barros Baeza (1810–1881), Chilean lawyer and politician
- José Reyes Baeza Terrazas (born 1961), Mexican politician and lawyer
- Lautaro Baeza (born 1990), Argentinian football player
- Mario Baeza (born 1951), Cuban-American corporate lawyer
- Mario Fernández Baeza (born 1947), Chilean lawyer, professor and politician
- Marta Baeza (born 1992), Brazilian fencer
- Miguel Baeza (fighter), American mixed martial artist
- Miguel Baeza (footballer) (born 2000), Spanish football player
- Nicolás Baeza (born 1997), Chilean football player
- Olegario Lazo Baeza (1878–1964), Chilean writer
- Pablo Baeza (born 1988), Chilean handball player
- Paloma Baeza (born 1975), British actress and director
- Ricardo Baeza Rodríguez, Chilean mathematician
- Ricardo Baeza-Yates (born 1961), Chilean computer scientist
- Virginia Baeza Estrella (born 1965), Mexican politician
