= Sebastiani =

Sebastiani is a surname. Notable people with the surname include:

- Amedeo Sebastiani, best known as Amadeus, Italian television and radio presenter
- Don Sebastiani (born 1953), American politician and Sebastiani Vineyards and Winery
- Franca Sebastiani (1949–2015), known early under the pseudonym Franchina, Italian singer
- Horace François Bastien Sébastiani de La Porta (1771–1851), French diplomat, general and politician, brother of Tiburce
- Jesse Sebastiani, Canadian YouTuber
- Johann Sebastiani (1622–1683), German composer
- Lorenzo Sebastiani, Italian rugby player
- Luis Abilio Sebastiani Aguirre (1935–2020), Peruvian Catholic archbishop
- Michel Sebastiani, French fencing master
- Pablo Caballero Sebastiani (born 1987), Uruguayan footballer
- Paola Sebastiani (fl. from 1992), Italian biostatistician
- Pía Sebastiani (1925–2015), Argentine pianist and composer
- Sebastian Sebastiani (died 1626), Italian sculptor and founder
- Sergio Sebastiani (1931–2024), Italian prelate of the Catholic Church
- Tiburce Sébastiani, French general and politician, brother of Horace

== See also ==
- Brusqeulia sebastiani, species of moth
- Marginella sebastiani, species of sea snail
- Nanuca sebastiani, species of sea slug
- Turbonilla sebastiani, species of sea snail
- i Sebastiani, a Commedia dell'Arte theatre troupe formed in 1990
