= Orozco =

Orozco is a surname of Spanish/Basque origin. Notable people with the surname include:

- Ana María Orozco (born 1973), Colombian actress
- Andrés Orozco (born 1979), Colombian football player
- Andrés Orozco-Estrada (born 1977), violinist and conductor
- Antonio Orozco (born 1972), Spanish singer-songwriter
- Aurora Estrada Orozco (1918–2011), Mexican American community leader
- Caleb Orozco (born 1973), LGBT activist in Belize
- Daniel Orozco (born 1957), American writer
- Daniel Orozco (footballer) (born 1987), Spanish retired footballer
- Danilo Orozco (1944–2013), Cuban musicologist
- Edwin Orozco (born 1982), Colombian road cyclist
- Esther Orozco (born 1945), Mexican biologist and researcher
- Ezequiel Orozco (1988–2018), Mexican football player
- Gabriel Orozco (born 1962), Mexican artist
- Germán Orozco (born 1976), Argentine field hockey player
- John Orozco (born 1992), American gymnast
- Jonathan Orozco (born 1986), Mexican football player
- José Clemente Orozco (1883–1949), Mexican painter
- Juan Orozco (1937–2020), Spanish luthier and guitar impresario
- Lisseth Orozco (born 1986), Colombian judoka
- Michael Orozco (born 1986), American soccer player
- Olga Orozco (1920–1999), Argentine poet
- Pascual Orozco (1882–1915), Mexican revolutionary leader
- Rafael Orozco (disambiguation), several people
- Verónica Orozco (born 1979), Colombian actress and singer, sister of Ana
- Yadira Pascault Orozco, French-Mexican actress, writer, producer and sitarist

== See also ==
- Orosco
