= Diego Pérez de Valdivia =

Diego Pérez de Valdivia (1520/24 – 28 February 1589) was a Spanish disciple of John of Ávila who wrote on lay spirituality.

== Life ==
Born in Baeza, Pérez de Valdivia was sent by John of Ávila to study at Salamanca. He taught philosophy at Granada for three years before becoming Professor of Holy Scripture at the University of Baeza from 1549 to 1577. He was archdeacon of Jaén from 1569 to 1574, but subjected to the Inquisition from 1574 to 1577 on suspicion of alumbradismo. From 1578 to 1589 he was Professor of Scripture at the University of Barcelona. He died on 28 February 1589.

== Works ==
- Camino y puerta para la oración mental [Pathway and guide for private prayer], 1580
- Aviso de gente recogida [Notice of people gathered], 1585. Dedicated to Juan de Ribera.
- Tratado de la frequente comunión, Barcelona: Casa de Pedro Malo, 1589
- Explicación... del libro de los Cantares de Salomón [Understanding... the book of Songs of Solomon], 1600
- Tratado de la singular y purísima Concepción de la Madre de Dios [Treatise on the singular and pure Conception of the Mother of God], 1600
