= Colegio Maestro Ávila =

Coordinates: 40.964909003818214°N 5.670580047672867°W

Colegio Maestro ávila
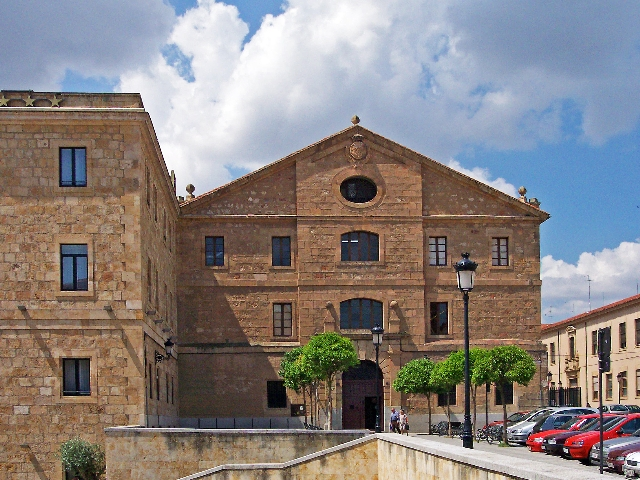
- Colegio Maestro Ávila

Location
- Salamanca; Spain

Information
- Established: 1972
- Principal: D. Herminio Alegría Gil
- Affiliations: Catholic
- Website: www.colegiomaestroavila.com

Colegio Maestro Ávila is a Catholic primary and secondary school located in Salamanca, Spain. It was funded by the priests of the Diocesan Labour Priests Brotherhood in honour of Emmanuel Domingo y Sol. It is named after John of Ávila.
