= Gaspar de Baeza =

Gaspar de Baeza (1540 in Baeza – 1569) was a Spanish humanist, lawyer, translator and writer known during the Spanish Golden Age.

He studied law at the University of Granada and University of Salamanca, where he was a pupil of Juan Orozco. He was considered one of the most important jurisconsults of his time, in the wake of the so-called Latin legal humanism practiced in Italy by the famous Andrea Alciato. He practiced as a lawyer in the Royal Chancery of Granada and professor at its university and frequented Alonso de Granada Venegas's tertulia, where he met Hernando de Acuña, Diego Hurtado de Mendoza, Juan Latino, Luis Barahona de Soto, Pedro de Padilla, Gregorio Silvestre and Jorge de Montemayor. He translated into Spanish the Historia General (Salamanca: 1562-63); Comunidades de España (Granada: 1564) and the Elogios o vidas breves de los caballeros antiguos y modernos (Granada: 1568), works written in Latin by the "doctissimo Paulo Jovino", better known as Paulo Jovio. He was also noted for his mastery of theology, philosophy, grammar, geography and history.

== Works ==
- In Caroli Quinti... constitutionem de non meliorandi filiabus dotis ratione... enarratio (Granada, 1566).
- De Decima Tutori Hispanico iure praestanda tractatus (Granada, 1567).
- Prima Pars tractatus de Inope debitore (Granada, 1592).
- Opera Omnia Gasparis Beatiae (Madrid, 1592).
