= Sebastianus (disambiguation) =

Sebastianus (died 413) was a Roman noble and usurping emperor.

Other notable people named Sebastianus include:

- Sebastianus (magister peditum) (died 378), a Roman military leader
- Sebastianus (magister militum) (died before 445 or in 450), a Roman military leader

== See also ==
- Sebastian (disambiguation)
- Sebastiani (disambiguation)
