= Yoya Martínez =

Chilean actress

- Born: Ofelia Martner Semblett; August 27, 1912; Santiago, Chile
- Died: February 1, 2009 (aged 96)
- Occupation: Actress

Yoya Martínez, real name Ofelia Martner Semblett (August 27, 1912 Santiago, Chile - February 1, 2009) was a Chilean actress. She is best known for her role as Hilda Viuda de Maturana on the popular TVN television series, Los Venegas from 1989 until 2008.

== Filmography ==
=== Television series ===
- Incomunicados (1968)
- El loco estero (1968)
- La señora (1969)
- J.J. Juez (1975)
- La madrastra (1981)
- La señora (1982)
- Bienvenido hermano Andes (1982)
- La noche del cobarde (1983)
- La trampa (1985)
- La última cruz (1987)
- La intrusa (1989)
- Marrón Glacé, el regreso (1996)
- Santiago city (1997)
- Fuera de control (1999)
- La vida es una lotería (2002) (2 episodios)
- Geografía del deseo (2004)
- Los Venegas (1989-2008)

=== Films ===
- Yo vendo unos ojos negros (1948)
- The Last Gallop (1951)
- El burócrata (1964)
- Treinta años (2006)
