= Brusqeulia atrograpta =

Scientific classification
- Kingdom: Animalia
- Phylum: Arthropoda
- Clade: Pancrustacea
- Class: Insecta
- Order: Lepidoptera
- Family: Tortricidae
- Genus: Brusqeulia
- Species: B. atrograpta

Binomial name
- Brusqeulia atrograpta Razowski & Becker, 2011

Species of moth

Brusqeulia atrograpta is a species of moth of the family Tortricidae. It is found in Minas Gerais, Brazil.

The wingspan is about 12 mm (0.47 in).

== Etymology ==
The specific name refers to the forewing colouration and is said to be derived from Greek ater (meaning black) and graptos (meaning written, painted). In explaining another epithet in the same article, Razowski and Becker, label the word ater as Latin. In ancient Greek, ater is not attested, while in classical Latin, ater means "black".
