= Brusqeulia guaramiranga =

Scientific classification
- Kingdom: Animalia
- Phylum: Arthropoda
- Clade: Pancrustacea
- Class: Insecta
- Order: Lepidoptera
- Family: Tortricidae
- Genus: Brusqeulia
- Species: B. guaramiranga

Binomial name
- Brusqeulia guaramiranga Razowski & Becker, 2011

Species of moth

Brusqeulia guaramiranga is a species of moth of the family Tortricidae. It is found in Brazil.

The wingspan is about 11.5 mm.

== Etymology ==
The specific name refers to the type locality, Guaramiranga.
