= Brusqeulia =

Scientific classification
- Kingdom: Animalia
- Phylum: Arthropoda
- Clade: Pancrustacea
- Class: Insecta
- Order: Lepidoptera
- Family: Tortricidae
- Tribe: Euliini
- Genus: Brusqeulia; Razowski & Becker, 2000

Genus of tortrix moths

Brusqeulia is a genus of moths belonging to the family Tortricidae.

== Species ==
- Brusqeulia atrocentra Razowski & Becker, 2011
- Brusqeulia atrograpta Razowski & Becker, 2011
- Brusqeulia baeza Razowski & Becker, 2011
- Brusqeulia bonita Razowski & Becker, 2011
- Brusqeulia caracagena Razowski & Becker, 2011
- Brusqeulia ceriphora Razowski & Becker, 2011
- Brusqeulia costispina Razowski & Becker, 2011
- Brusqeulia guaramiranga Razowski & Becker, 2011
- Brusqeulia jacupiranga Razowski & Becker, 2011
- Brusqeulia monoloba Razowski & Becker, 2011
- Brusqeulia sebastiani Razowski & Becker, 2000
- Brusqeulia signifera Razowski & Becker, 2000
- Brusqeulia tineimorpha Razowski & Becker, 2011
- Brusqeulia tripuncta Razowski & Becker, 2000
- Brusqeulia uncicera Razowski & Becker, 2011

== See also ==
- List of Tortricidae genera
