= Brusqeulia atrocentra =

Scientific classification
- Kingdom: Animalia
- Phylum: Arthropoda
- Clade: Pancrustacea
- Class: Insecta
- Order: Lepidoptera
- Family: Tortricidae
- Genus: Brusqeulia
- Species: B. atrocentra

Binomial name
- Brusqeulia atrocentra Razowski & Becker, 2011

Species of moth

Brusqeulia atrocentra is a species of moth of the family Tortricidae. It is found in Minas Gerais, Brazil.

The wingspan is about 13 mm (0.51 in).
