= University of Baeza =

Spanish university

- Universidad de Baeza
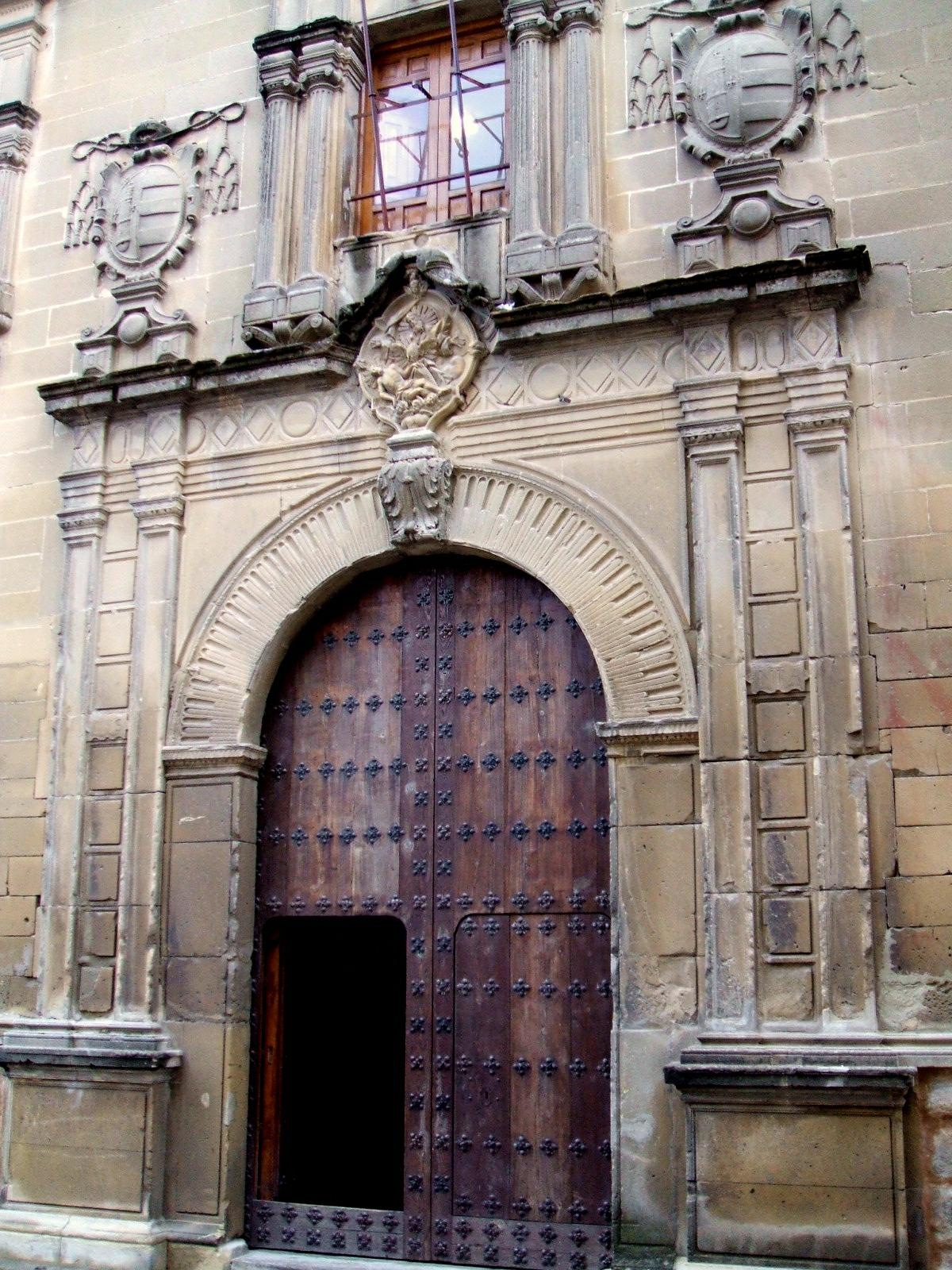
- Entrance to the university building
- Type: Pontifical university
- Active: 1538–1824
- Founders: Pope Paul III, Rodrigo López

The University of Baeza (Spanish: Universidad de Baeza) was a university in Baeza in the old Kingdom of Jaén, Spain. Established in 1538, it existed until 1824. The surviving university building was built in 1595.

== History ==
The University of Baeza was established in 1538 by a papal bull of Paul III. Its first rector was Saint John of Avila. After successfully fending off an attempt in 1585 by the Augustinians to establish a rival university, in 1630, Pope Urban VIII granted it the status of a pontifical university, upon the demise of the university in nearby Jaén.

The curriculum included liberal arts, medicine, and theology. Founded by notary Rodrigo López, a relative of Pope Paul III, the school had important early participation from so-called New Christians—bourgeois Jews who had converted to Christianity rather than leave Spain—as well as from the Jesuits and the Carmelites; Saint John of the Cross participated in prayer seminars there.

In terms of the battles over theology, the University of Baeza in its early years was distinctly on the modernizing side. Between its alumbrado mysticism and the Jewish ancestry of many of its faculty (including rector John of Avila), the university aroused the suspicions of the Spanish Inquisition. Many of its most popular faculty faced the Inquisition. While Hernán Núñez, Hernando de Herrera, Diego Pérez de Valdivia and Bernardino de Carleval all escaped any formal conviction, the Inquisition effectively ended all of their careers, as they spent large portions of their lives entangled in its processes. Bernardino de Carleval was forced to formally recant a statement that the Jews were not responsible for the crucifixion of Jesus.

Eventually, both the city and university went into a long decline, as did all urban settlements in the province of Jaén. The province increasingly became a rural backwater, a pattern that continued until quite recent times. The local aristocracy became absentees, at court in Madrid or living in other major Spanish cities, investing their wealth there rather than in Jaén and Baeza; the textile industry that had been the basis of local wealth went into a particular decline. Teaching at the university ossified, and an 1807 decree abolished the university. There was a brief, and rather weak, revival in 1815, followed by the definitive abolition of the university in 1824.

In 1979, university-level education in Baeza was revived with the establishment of a "summer university", originally affiliated with the University of Granada and, since 1994, with the International University of Andalusia. The program is now known as the Antonio Machado Summer University, after the Spanish poet who lived for a time in the city.

The old building of the University of Baeza is now used by the Instituto "Stma. Trinidad" ("Holy Trinity"), which describes itself as the "cultural heir of the old university of Baeza". They have revived and, to some degree, updated such facilities as the university library and some of its halls, and supplement the Renaissance-era building with modern sports facilities and present-day technologies.

== See also ==
- List of early modern universities in Europe
