= Roman Catholic Diocese of Baeza =

Former Roman Catholic diocese in Spain

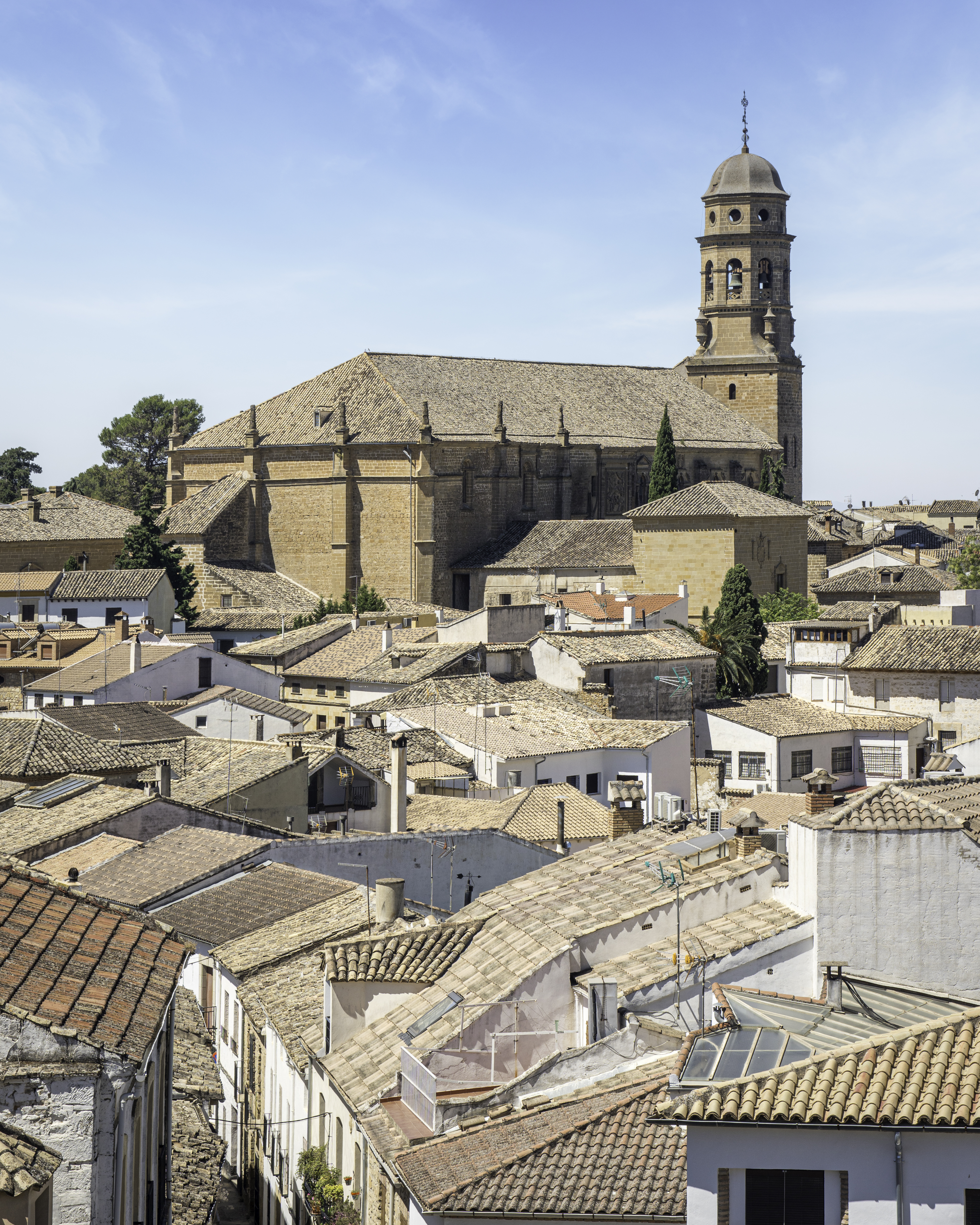
View of the former cathedral and the historic centre of Baeza.

The Roman Catholic Diocese of Baeza (Latin: Beatia) was a Visigothic Catholic bishopric, suppressed under Moorish rule and shortly restored in the 13th century, which remains a Latin titular see.

== History ==
Some claim that Ancient Roman Beatia became the seat of a bishop in the Visigothic Kingdom of Toledo between 656 and 675, when the Diocese of Castulo was transferred to Beatia, on territory previously belonging to the Diocese of Tucci.

In 715 was established a Diocese of Baeza / Beatia (Curiate Italian = Latin) / Biatien(sis) (Latin adjective) in its own right, on canonical territory split off from the suppressed Diocese of Tucci, as a suffragan of the Archbishopric of Toledo (in the Visigothic and later Castilian royal capital), but the Moorish rule (since 711) doomed it after a few more bishops, including martyrs.

In 900 the bishopric was suppressed, but king Alfonso VIII of Castile (1158-1214) still mentions it in his Chronicle.

The diocese was shortly restored from 1227, when the Baeza Cathedral, then dedicated to the Assumption of Mary (which the Moors had turned into a mosque), was reinstated (Catedral de la Asunción de la Virgen), until 1249, when the see was transferred for good and its territory merged into the Roman Catholic Diocese of Jaén. The former cathedral, although a Minor World Heritage Site (since 2003 part of a UNESCO World Heritage Site with other monuments in Baeza and in the nearby city of Úbeda), never became a (co-)cathedral again.

=== Residential Ordinaries ===
(all Latin Rite; incomplete)

Recorded Suffragan Bishops of Baeza were :

- Saro (862? – ?)
- the Dominican (O.P.) Domingo (1236–1249; formerly bishop of Bishop of Marocco (27 October 1225 – 1236)).

=== Titular see ===
No longer a residential bishopric, Beatia is today listed by the Catholic Church as a Latin titular see.

It has had the following incumbents, so far of the fitting Episcopal (lowest) rank :

- Albin Małysiak, Lazarists (C.M.) (1970.01.14 – death 2011.07.16), as Auxiliary Bishop of Archdiocese of Krakow (Poland) (1970.01.14 – retired 1993.02.27) and on emeritate
- Wiesław Śmigiel (2012.03.24 – 2017.11.11), Auxiliary Bishop of the Diocese of Pelplin (Poland) (2012.03.24 – 2017.11.11)
- José Cobo Cano (2017.12.29 – 2023.06.12), Auxiliary Bishop of the Diocese of Madrid (Spain) (2018.02.17 – 2023.06.12)
- Juan Carlos Londoño (2023.12.12 – ...), Auxiliary Bishop of the Archdiocese of Quebec (Canada) (2023.12.12 – ...)

== See also ==
- List of Catholic dioceses in Spain, Andorra, Ceuta and Gibraltar
- Baeza Cathedral

== Sources and external links ==
- GCatholic - former and titular see, with Google satellite photo - data for all sections
- GCatholic - former cathedral
