= Orosco =

Orosco is a surname of Spanish Basque origin. Notable people with the surname include:

- Brian Orosco (born 1998), Argentine soccer player
- Jesse Orosco (born 1957), American baseball player
- Raúl Orosco (born 1979), Bolivian soccer referee

== See also ==
- Orozco
