= Olegario Lazo Baeza =

Chilean writer

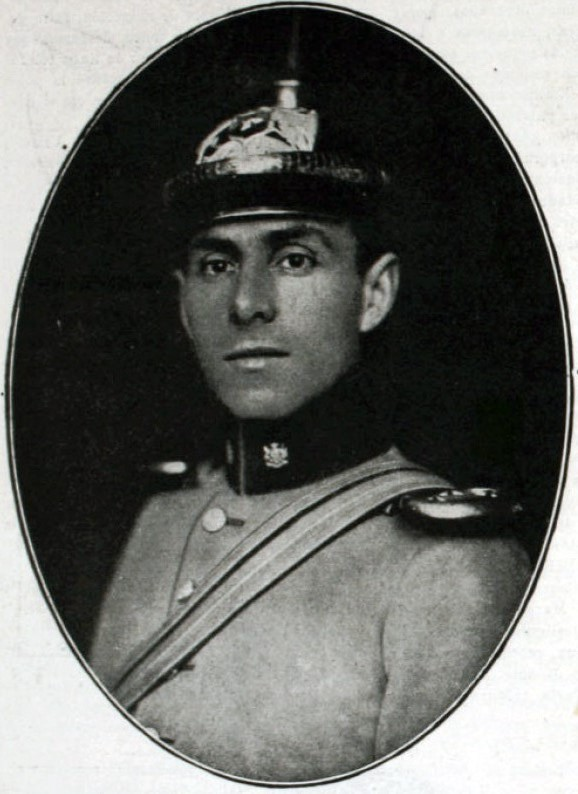
Olegario Lazo Baeza Chilean military and writer (1878 - 1964)

Olegario Lazo Baeza (1878 in San Fernando, Chile – 1964 in Santiago) was a Chilean military and writer, member of Academia Chilena de la Lengua.

== Biography ==
Son of Fidel Lazo Ponce de León and Julia Baeza Fuenzalida, he began his studies in his hometown, entered the Liceo of San Fernando in 1890 and five years later at the National Institute of Santiago, where he attended the 4th year of secondary school and finally the following year at the Military School, from which he graduated in 1898 as a cavalry second lieutenant.

Assigned to the Curicó Dragon Regiment, he stood out as the best horseman in the Chilean Army of his time. He remained in Curicó until 1902, when he moved to Cazadores de Santiago. In April of the following year he served as an assistant to the first division of the Army in Tacna. In July of the same year he served in the Húsares de Iquique and in December he returned to the Dragones. In 1905 he took a course at the School of Application of Military Engineers and then spent three years organizing squads of gendarmes in the northern pampas. In 1909 he returned to the Dragones, now as captain. In the spring he suffers an equestrian accident, the consequences of which years later would force him to abandon his military career.

In 1912 he married the writer Sara Jarpa Austro-Hungarian Empire to study horse breeding and breeding services. He returned to Chile in 1914 and three years later he retired from the army.

He was consul between 1915 and 1932 in Alicante, Spain; in Hull, England and Bordeaux, France.

He wrote books on military topics; Fictional ones focus on the common and simple facts of military life. Fundamentally a short story writer, he published his first story —Honor de soldado— [Soldier's Honor] in 1907 and the first compilation of it in 1922. He also wrote a novel, The postrer galope [The Last Gallop], about the atmosphere in Tacna after the Chilean occupation. This work was made into a film by Chilefilms in 1951 under the name El último galope [The Last Gallop].

In 1960 he was elected honorary member of the Chilean Academy of Language.

In the San Fernando commune there is a school that bears his name. The street where he was born was renamed in his honor in 1960.

== Works ==
- Reproducción y remonta caballar, 1915
- Cuentos militares, 1922, reúne 18 relatos
- Nuevos cuentos militares, 1924, contiene 14 relatos, entre ellos el clásico El padre
- Otros cuentos militares, 1944
- El postrer galope, 1944
- Hombres y caballos, 1951
- Complot, 1957, cuentos escogidos
- El padre (cuentos de chile 2)
