= Brusqeulia bonita =

Scientific classification
- Kingdom: Animalia
- Phylum: Arthropoda
- Clade: Pancrustacea
- Class: Insecta
- Order: Lepidoptera
- Family: Tortricidae
- Genus: Brusqeulia
- Species: B. bonita

Binomial name
- Brusqeulia bonita Razowski & Becker, 2011

Species of moth

Brusqeulia bonita is a species of moth of the family Tortricidae. It is found in Bahia, Brazil.

The wingspan is about 11 mm.

== Etymology ==
The specific name refers to the type locality, Bonito.
