= Joan Frances Gormley =

American scholar and consecrated virgin

Joan Frances Gormley (October 6, 1937 - October 19, 2007), a consecrated virgin in the Catholic Church, was an American scholar in the fields of classical literature and of biblical studies. She was a professor in the Department of Sacred Scripture at Mount St. Mary's Seminary. She translated and produced a number of works by leading Catholic mystics, such as Edith Stein and John of Avila.

== Life and work ==
Gormley was born in Philadelphia, Pennsylvania, one of 13 children of John Gormley and Dorothy Edna (Hihns) Gormley. After high school, she entered the Sisters of Notre dame de Namur, which she later left. She attended Trinity College in Washington, D.C., after which she earned a Masters of Arts in Classics from Harvard University. She went on to receive a doctorate in New Testament Studies from Fordham University in New York City.

After receiving her doctorate, Gormley returned to her alma mater, Trinity College, where she taught classics and theology. During this time, she did post-doctoral studies at the École Biblique in Jerusalem. She did extensive research on the life and writings of Therese of Lisieux, to whom she had a strong devotion, at the Theresian Documentation Center in Lisieux, France, as well as her work on that of the Jewish-German convert, Edith Stein.

In 1988, Gormley joined the faculty of Mount St. Mary's Seminary in Emmitsburg, Maryland, where she taught Scripture to the seminarians. She spent the Fall semester of 2003 on a sabbatical. During this time, she researched the life and writings of the Spanish priest, John of Avila, patron saint of the Spanish clergy, who had recently been declared a Doctor of the Church. Her work resulted in a new translation of his best known work, Audi, filia (Listen, O Daughter).

She was promoted to professor in the department in 2004. An active participant in a number of theological associations, she published a commentary on Dei verbum (the Dogmatic Constitution on Divine Revelation), issued by the Second Vatican Council, for Catholic Distance University.

== Death ==
Gormley died in Gettysburg, Pennsylvania on October 19, 2007. Her remains were buried in Calvary Cemetery in Conshohocken, Pennsylvania.
