= Manuel Domingo y Sol =

Beatified Spanish Roman Catholic priest

Blessed Manuel Domingo y Sol
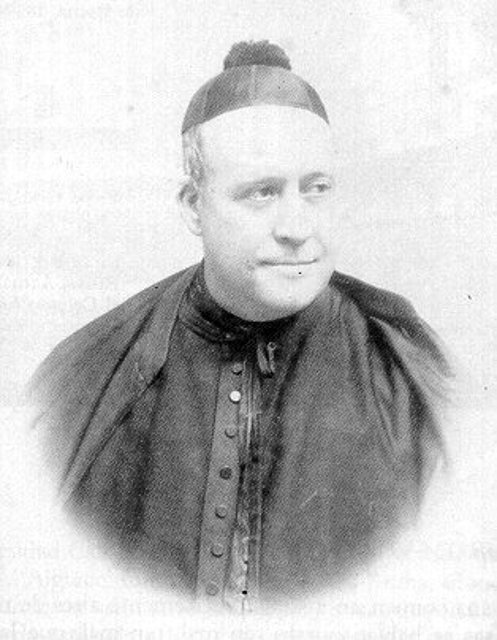
- Photograph.

Priest
- Born: 1 April 1836; Tortosa, Tarragona, Kingdom of Spain
- Died: 25 January 1909 (aged 72); Tortosa, Tarragona, Kingdom of Spain
- Venerated in: Roman Catholic Church
- Beatified: 29 March 1987, Saint Peter's Square, Vatican City by Pope John Paul II
- Feast: 25 January
- Attributes: Priest's cassock
- Patronage: Pontifical Spanish College; Diocesan Labour Priests of the Sacred Heart of Jesus

Manuel Domingo y Sol (1 April 1836 - 25 January 1909) was a Spanish Roman Catholic priest and the founder of the Pontifical Spanish College in Rome and the religious order known as the Diocesan Labour Priests of the Sacred Heart of Jesus (1883). As a new priest he had built a sports arena and a theater to provide a place for adolescents to engage in sport activities and to act.

His beatification cause started under Pope Pius XII in 1946 and he was titled as a Servant of God while Pope Paul VI later titled him as Venerable in 1970 upon the confirmation of his heroic virtue; Pope John Paul II beatified him on 29 March 1987 in Saint Peter's Square.

== Life ==
Manuel Domingo y Sol was born on 1 April 1836 in Tortosa as the last of twelve children and was baptized in the same month at some point.

In 1851 he commenced his studies at Tortosa for the priesthood and was later ordained as such on 2 June 1860; he celebrated his first Mass on 7 June at the church of Saint Blai. The Bishop of Tortosa Benet Vilamitjana i Vila - in 1862 - requested he go to the Valencia college for further studies and in 1865 he obtained a licentiate in theology. He became a religious education teacher in 1864 and a professor at his old seminary in 1865. On 7 March 1862 he was made a pastor of La Aldea and in 1863 sent to the parish of Santiago de Tortosa.

On one cold day in February 1873 he met the seminarian Ramón Valero who could not continue his studies because his Tortosa seminary was destroyed during the 1868 revolution. This touched Sol who - in September 1873 - opened "Saint Joseph's House" for seminarians and on 11 April 1879 opened the "College of Saint Joseph for Ecclesiastical Vocations".

He became firm in the need for a college in Rome to cater to Spanish seminarians and this idea would later come to fruition after he met Rafael Merry del Val in Rome at Piazza Navona; the latter decided to aid Sol in his mission. Sol founded the Pontifical Spanish College in Rome on 1 April 1892 and he soon lodged the first eleven seminarians at Via Giulia as the first students for that college. At the time there were some in the Spanish episcopate who were hostile to the idea and tried to stop it. It was their view that Spanish students should train at Spanish universities - in particular at Salamanca - and believed the students would become too "Romanized" as a result.

Pope Leo XIII welcomed Sol's efforts and ended up finding a home himself for the students and issued a grant on 25 October 1893 in the letter "Non medicori cura" for them to live at the usufruct of Palazzo Altemps near the Piazza Navona. The college was granted the honor of being "pontifical" during the pontificate of Pope Pius X due to the now Cardinal del Val's intervention. Sol founded a religious order - the Diocesan Labour Priests of the Sacred Heart of Jesus - on 29 January 1883 and it received diocesan approval on 1 January 1886 and the papal decree of praise from Leo XIII on 1 August 1898.

Sol died in 1909. His order received papal approval from Pope Pius XI after his death on 19 March 1927 and it now operates in states such as Portugal and the Democratic Republic of Congo.

== Beatification ==
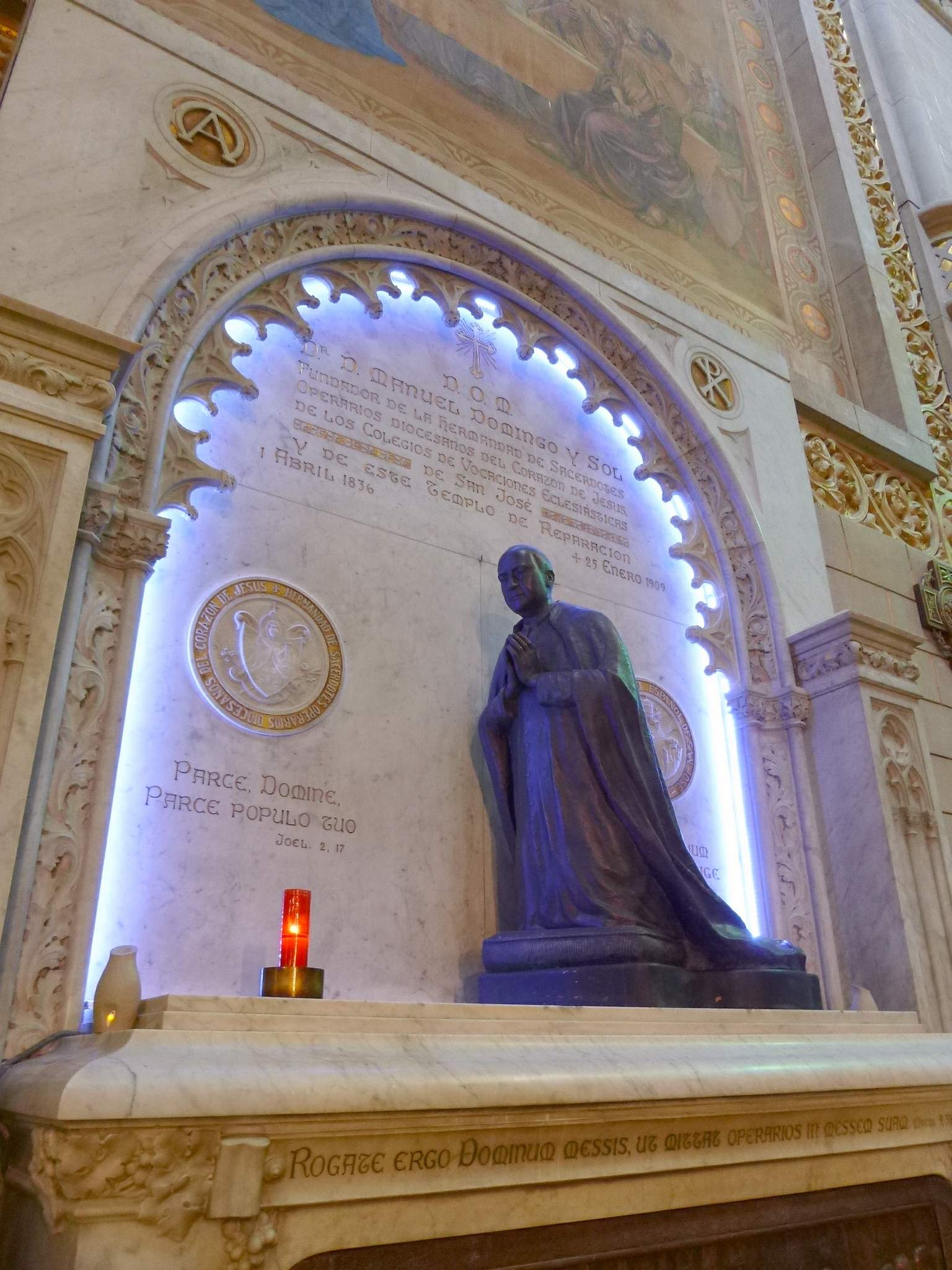
Tomb.

The beatification process opened in Tortosa that opened on 13 November 1930 in an informative process that closed sometime later. Theologians approved Sol's spiritual writings on 5 February 1941. The formal introduction to the cause came under Pope Pius XII on 12 July 1946 in which he was titled as a Servant of God; the confirmation of his heroic virtue allowed for Pope Paul VI to name him as Venerable on 4 May 1970.

The process for a miracle opened in Caracas and closed in 1976. The miracle in question involved an individual's complete and lasting cure from lung cancer in 1972; a medical board approved this miracle on 5 March 1986 as did theologians on 27 June 1986 and the Congregation for the Causes of Saints on 21 October 1986. Pope John Paul II approved this miracle on 10 November 1986 and later beatified Sol in Saint Peter's Square on 29 March 1987.

The current postulator for this cause is the Rev. Santiago Luis de Vega Alonso.

== Sources ==
- Bunson, Matthew and Margaret Bunson; John Paul II's Book of Saints, 1999, 2007, Our Sunday Visitor, Huntington, IN
