= The Last Gallop =

- Directed by: Luis A. Morales; Enrique Soto Toro
- Written by: Olegario Lazo
- Release date: 1951
- Country: Chile
- Language: Spanish

The Last Gallop (Spanish: El último galope) is a 1951 Chilean film directed by Luis A. Morales and Enrique Soto Toro. It is an adaptation of Olegario Lazo Baeza's military novel, "El Póstrer Galope," set in Tacna during Chile's occupation after the War of the Pacific.

The film is a military story filmed at the former Cavalry School, now the "San Isidro" Military Camp in Quillota. It portrays various aspects of life in the barracks at that time, especially the complicated interpersonal relationships among the officers.

Although considered lost for many years, the Cineteca at the University of Chile preserved some fragments of the movie, which underwent physical restoration and digitization. While 31 minutes of footage were rescued, the film's original duration could not be identified.

== Plot ==
The story takes place inside a Chilean army cavalry unit's barracks and narrates a love story between a married man and a girl from a small town. It also depicts the struggle of some officers to advance in their military careers and their desire to maintain strict discipline.

== Cast ==
- Gerardo Grez
- Plácido Martín
- Yoya Martinez
- Raúl Zenteno

== Bibliography ==
- Carlos Ossa Coo. Historia del cine chileno. Empresa Editora Nacional Quimantú, 1971.
