= Brusqeulia baeza =

Scientific classification
- Kingdom: Animalia
- Phylum: Arthropoda
- Clade: Pancrustacea
- Class: Insecta
- Order: Lepidoptera
- Family: Tortricidae
- Genus: Brusqeulia
- Species: B. baeza

Binomial name
- Brusqeulia baeza Razowski & Becker, 2011

Species of moth

Brusqeulia baeza is a species of moth of the family Tortricidae. It is found in Ecuador.

The wingspan is about 15 mm (0.59 in).
