= Frutos Baeza =

Spanish poet and writer (1861–1918)

Frutos Baeza (1861–1918) was a Spanish poet and writer of the Murcian dialect.

== Selected works ==
- Palicos and marbles, El Diario de Murcia, 1885
- Gunpowder in salvos, El Diario de Murcia, 1895
- From my land: romances, sides, stories and games represented the garden of Murcia, Murcia's Diary, 1897, 1899
- Cajines and Scots!, Editorial of my land, Murcia, 1904

== See also ==
- Murcia, Spain
