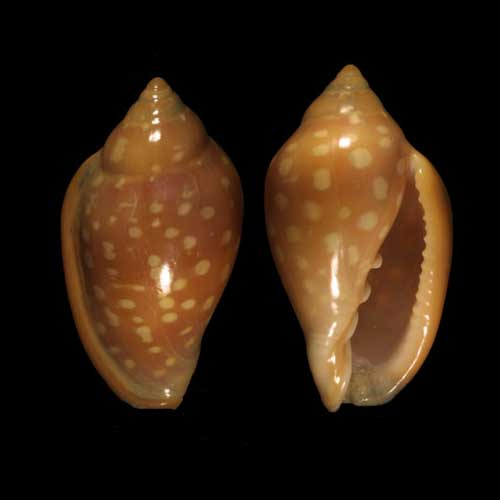

Scientific classification
- Kingdom: Animalia
- Phylum: Mollusca
- Class: Gastropoda
- Subclass: Caenogastropoda
- Order: Neogastropoda
- Family: Marginellidae
- Subfamily: Marginellinae
- Genus: Marginella
- Species: M. sebastiani

Binomial name
- Marginella sebastiani Marche-Marchad & Rosso, 1979

Synonyms
- Marginella (Marginella) sebastiani Marche-Marchad & Rosso, 1979· accepted, alternate representation

= Marginella sebastiani =

Species of gastropod

Marginella sebastiani is a species of sea snail, a marine gastropod mollusk in the family Marginellidae, the margin snails.

== Distribution ==
This marine species occurs off Senegal.
