= Rafael Orozco =

Rafael Orozco could refer to:

- Rafael Orozco (pianist) (1946–1996), Spanish classical pianist
- Rafael Orozco Maestre (1954–1992), Colombian vallenato singer
- Rafael Orozco (footballer) (1922–2015), Mexican association football player
