= I Sebastiani =

Commedia dell'Arte theatre troupe

i Sebastiani
- Founded: Cambridge, Massachusetts, United States (June 4, 1990)
- Founder: Jeff Hatalsky
- Headquarters: Boston, Massachusetts, U.S.
- Area served: From Texas to Montreal
- Key people: Catherine Crow (Capocomico)
- Services: Commedia dell'Arte performances & workshops

i Sebastiani is a Commedia dell'Arte theatre troupe formed in 1990 by Jeff Hatalsky. To the present day, i Sebastiani has performed for thousands of fans across the United States and Canada. The company has travelled as far as Montreal to the north, Miami to the south, and Texas to the west, performing more than 100 different improvisational scenarios.

i Sebastiani presently operates out of Boston, MA. They specialize in performances for educational institutions, historical organizations, and the general public. The troupe frequently performs to packed crowds at the Charles River Museum of Industry in Waltham, MA. A portion of the proceeds from recent shows have gone towards the repair of flooding damage. The damage was incurred by the Museum during historic rainfall in spring of 2010, when the Charles River reached a century high-water level.

== History ==
i Sebastiani was founded on June 4, 1990, as a splinter organization of the Society for Creative Anachronism (SCA). Founder Jeff Hatalsky's stated objective was to drive the group towards greater authenticity. In September 2001, i Sebastiani attended the Austin Commedia dell'Arte Festival in Austin Texas, where they were met with acclaim. From 1991 through September 2001, the Troupe had performed each Commedia dell'Arte scenario only once, but as demand for Commedia built, i Sebastiani began to perform multiple times with each scenario.

In October 1996, Jeff Hatalsky left the troupe, and it began a period of attempted democracy. This mode of organization imposed natural limitations, and through reform Alex Newman stepped beyond his role as coordinator to become the troupe's new Capocomico (manager). In October 2002, the troupe expanded beyond SCA events and began to perform for the general public.

i Sebastiani's Florida debut came at the Miami Improv Festival in 2006. Octavio Roca of the Miami New Times commented of the troupe that:

Their masks hark to the Renaissance, and their stock characters, including Arlecchino and Pantalone, are archetypes. But their plots come from the audience and — within the rough scenario that begins it all — their humor is of the streets.

== Historical Authenticity ==
Unlike many modern Commedia troupes, i Sebastiani attempts to make their performances authentic to the original 16th century Commedia time period. To maintain integrity of the historical genre, the troupe's scenarios are usually recreations of recorded historical scenarios. The published works of the 16th-century Commedia playwright Flaminio Scala provide one of the key sources for this material. Scenarios which are not adapted from the original time period are written in adherence to the maxims of historical scenarios and attempt to authentically portray the genre.

iSebastiani's props are also created for time-period accuracy using similar materials & methods. The making of Commedia's signature leather masks is a specialty studied by several troupe members for the purpose of making authentic costumes.

Because of Commedia's influence on western theatre, many elements of Commedia are broadly recognizable by modern audiences. The continuing popularity of Shakespeare, who adopted many characters & scenarios from Commedia, has also preserved many close descendants of the genre. Bill Eisele of South End News describes Commedia dell'Arte's 'comedy of errors' in regards to i Sebastiani's performance of The Twin Captains:

These characters seem so intent on messing up each other's lives, their conflicts call to mind the screwball comedies of Shakespeare, a source i Sebastiani pays homage to with all of its mistaken identities and star-crossed romantics.

== See also ==
- Commedia dell'arte
- Masks in theatre
- Well-known Commedia archetypes Pantalone, Arlecchino, Il Capitano, Il Dottore

== Bibliography ==
- Bostoniano I Sebastiani Present "The Pedant" at Charles River Museum Bostoniano online, February 3, 2013. 2013-02-28.
- Crick, Olly and Rudin, John. Commedia Dell'Arte: A Handbook for Troupes Routledge May 31, 2001. ISBN 0-4152-0409-7
- Eisele, Bill If Shakespeare Tackled the Improv Circuit Boston: South End News. Vol. 24, No. 27. South End News, July 24, 2003.
- Roca, Octavio Just the Funny: Newest improv festival, long and uncut Miami: Miami New Times, LLC. Miami New Times, Jan 12 2006. 2013-02-28.
- Rossi, Carl A. What Happened in Boston, Willie: Reviews of Current Productions The Theater Mirror, 2003. 2013-02-28.
- Weisstuch, Liza Commedia tonight: i Sebastiani keep an art alive The Boston Phoenix, July 31, 2003. 2013-02-28.
