= John of Ávila =

Spanish priest and Doctor of the Church

Saint John of Ávila
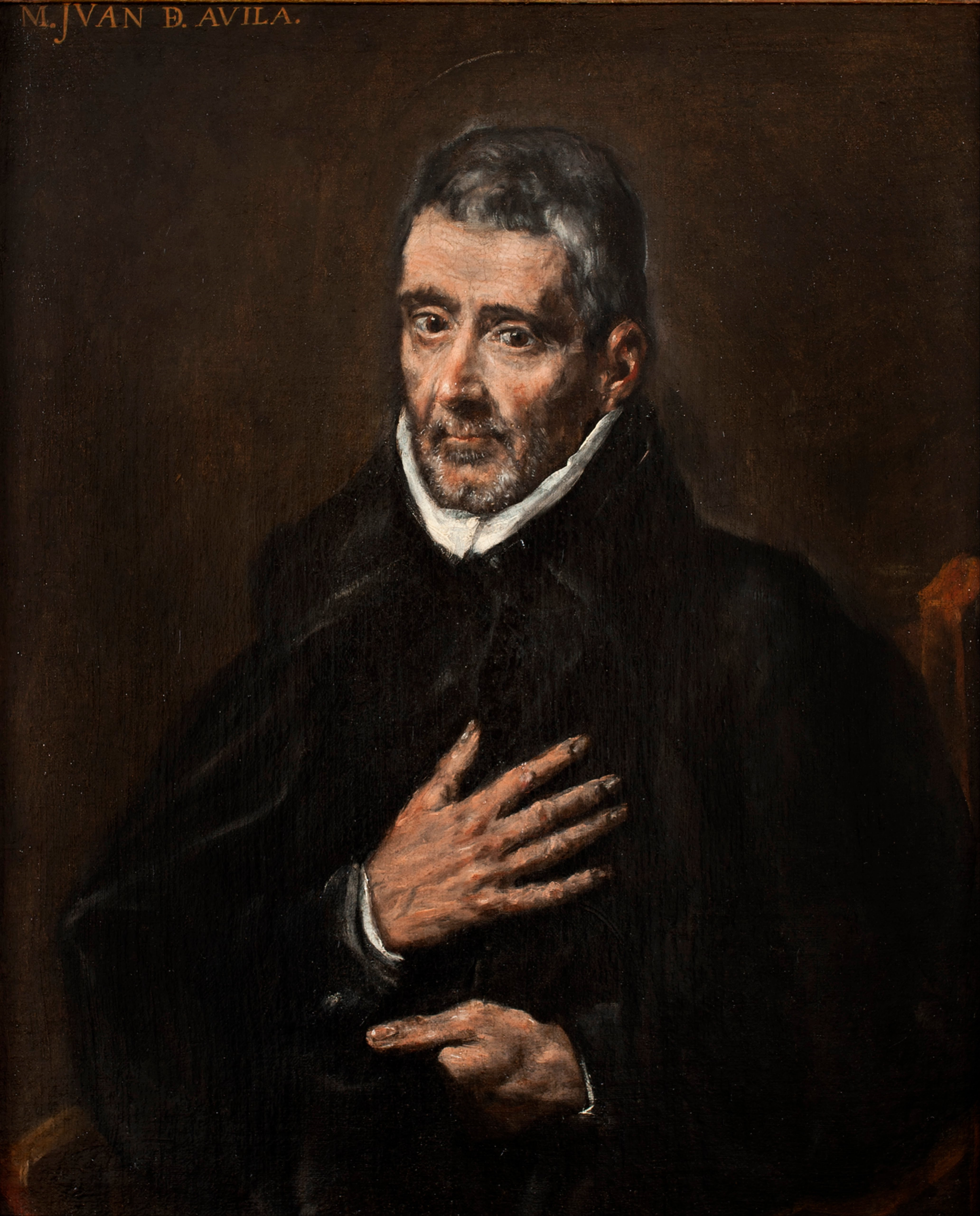
- Portrait by El Greco (1580)

Priest, Doctor of the Church and Apostle of Andalusia
- Born: 6 January 1499; Almodóvar del Campo, Kingdom of Toledo, Crown of Castile
- Died: 10 May 1569 (aged 70); Montilla, Kingdom of Córdoba, Crown of Castile
- Venerated in: Catholic Church
- Beatified: 12 November 1893 by Pope Leo XIII
- Canonized: 31 May 1970 by Pope Paul VI
- Major shrine: Church of the Incarnation; Montilla, Córdoba, Spain
- Feast: 10 May
- Patronage: Andalusia, Spain; Spanish secular clergy
- Influenced: Teresa of Ávila, John of God, Francis Borgia, Louis of Granada

John of Ávila (Spanish: Juan de Ávila; 6 January 1499– 10 May 1569) was a Spanish priest, preacher, scholastic author, and religious mystic, who has been declared a saint and Doctor of the Church by the Catholic Church. He is called the "Apostle of Andalusia", for his extensive ministry in that region.

== Life ==
=== Early years ===
He was born in Almodóvar del Campo, in the modern-day Province of Ciudad Real, to Alfonso de Ávila, of Jewish converso descent, and Catalina Xixón (or Gijón), a wealthy and pious couple. At the age of fourteen, in 1513, he was sent to the University of Salamanca to study law; he withdrew in 1517, however, without receiving a degree.

Returning home, Ávila spent the next three years in the practice of austere piety. His sanctity impressed a Franciscan friar journeying through Almodóvar, on whose advice he resumed his studies by matriculating at the University of Alcalá de Henares (which was moved to the national capital in the 19th century and renamed the Complutense University of Madrid). There he undertook the study of philosophy and theology, in which he was fortunate to have as his teacher the noted Dominican friar Domingo de Soto. It appears that Ávila earned his bachelor's degree during his years at Alcalá and then left without completing requirements for the licentiate degree.

Both his parents died while Ávila was still a student, and after his ordination in spring 1526, he celebrated his first Mass in the church where they were buried. He then sold the family property and gave the proceeds to the poor. He saw in the severing of natural ties a vocation to foreign missionary work and prepared to go to Mexico. He therefore traveled to Seville to await departure for the Indies in January 1527 with the Dominican friar, Julián Garcés, appointed the first Bishop of Tlaxcala. While waiting in Seville, his unusually great devotion in celebrating Mass, and his skills in catechesis and preaching, attracted the attention of Hernando de Contreras, a local priest, who mentioned him to the Archbishop of Seville and Inquisitor General, Alonso Manrique de Lara. The archbishop saw in the young cleric a powerful instrument to stir up the faith in Andalusia, and after considerable persuasion Juan was induced to abandon his journey to America.

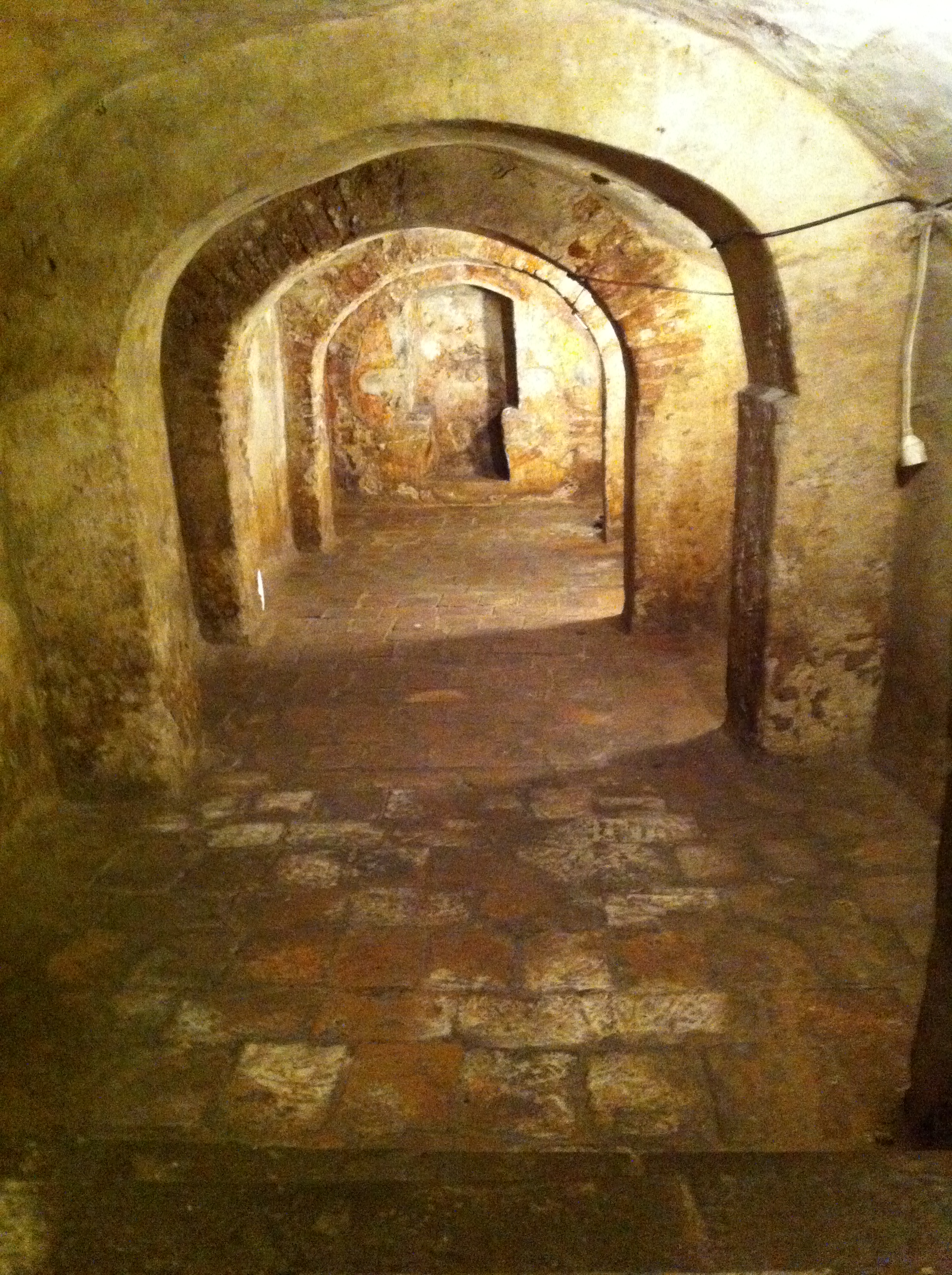
The basement of the family home of John of Ávila in Almodóvar del Campo, Ciudad Real, Spain

John seems to have lived in the initial years after 1526 in a small house in Seville with another priest, probably Contreras, and disciples gathered around him, in a loosely structured fraternal life. It was at the request of the younger sister of one of these disciples, Sancha Carrillo, that he began in 1527 to write the Audi, filia (Listen, Daughter), a work he continued expanding and editing until his death.

=== Apostle of Andalusia ===
John's first sermon was preached on 22 July 1529, and immediately established his reputation. During his nine years of missionary work in Andalusia, crowds packed the churches at all his sermons. However, his strong pleas for reform and his denunciation of the behaviour of the aristocracy meant that he was denounced to the office of the Inquisition in Seville in 1531, and put in prison in the summer of 1532. He was charged with exaggerating the dangers of wealth and with closing the gates of heaven to the rich. The charges were refuted and he was declared innocent and released in July 1533.

Around the end of 1534 or the beginning of 1535, John of Ávila was incardinated into the Diocese of Córdoba, from which he received a small benefice. This city became his base for directing his disciples and moving around Andalusia, preaching and establishing schools and colleges in various neighbouring cities such as Granada, Baeza, Montilla and Zafra. It is thought that during this time Ávila received the title of Master of Sacred Theology, probably in Granada around 1538.

Of special importance was the University of Baeza, established in 1538 by a papal bull of Pope Paul III. Ávila served as its first rector, and it became a model for seminaries and for the schools of the Jesuits.

Ávila stayed in Granada from 1538–9, where it appears some kind of community was taking shape. Likewise, during the years 1546 to 1555, John lived with about 20 disciples in Córdoba, making it seem that he intended to begin some kind of formal foundation of apostolic priests. However, the foundation and fast expansion of the Jesuits meant that these ideas never came to fruition; from early 1551, when Ávila began to experience poor health, he began actively encouraging his disciples who so desired to join the Jesuits (around 30 in total seem to have joined).

=== Death ===
From early 1551 Ávila was in constant ill-health. He spent the last years of his life in semi-retirement in the town of Montilla, in the Province of Córdoba. He died there on 10 May 1569, and in accordance with his wishes was buried in that city, in the Jesuit Church of the Incarnation, which now serves as the sanctuary to his memory.

== Works ==
The Spanish critical edition of 1970 presents Ávila's work in 6 volumes. These consist of two redactions he made of the Audi, filia, 82 sermons and spiritual conferences, a few Biblical commentaries, 257 letters (representing the period from 1538 until his death), several treatises on reform and other minor treatises. John wrote letters to prelates who consulted him, such as Pedro Guerrero, Archbishop of Granada, and Juan de Ribera and Thomas of Villanova, both archbishops of Valencia who were later canonised. He also wrote to Ignatius of Loyola, John of God and Teresa of Ávila.

=== Modern editions ===
Saint John of Ávila's works were collected at Madrid in 1618, 1757, 1792 and 1805; a French translation by D'Andilly was published at Paris in 1673; and a German translation by Schermer in six volumes was issued at Regensburg between 1856 and 1881.

The Audi, filia was translated into English in 1620. A modern translation was published by the American scholar Joan Frances Gormley in 2006.

A selection of his letters, entitled Spiritual Letters, were translated into English in 1631, a facsimile edition of which was printed in 1970.

Two of his treatises, On the Love of God and On the Priesthood, were translated into English in 2012.

== Influence ==
Ávila's saintly reputation, as well as his efforts to reform the clergy, to establish schools and colleges, and to catechise the laity, were the inspiration for many later reformers. He is especially revered by the Jesuits. Their development in Spain is attributed to his friendship and support for the Society of Jesus.

There is a church in Alcalá de Henares dedicated to him: St. John of Ávila Parish Church. The school Colegio Maestro Ávila in Salamanca is named after him.

=== Veneration ===
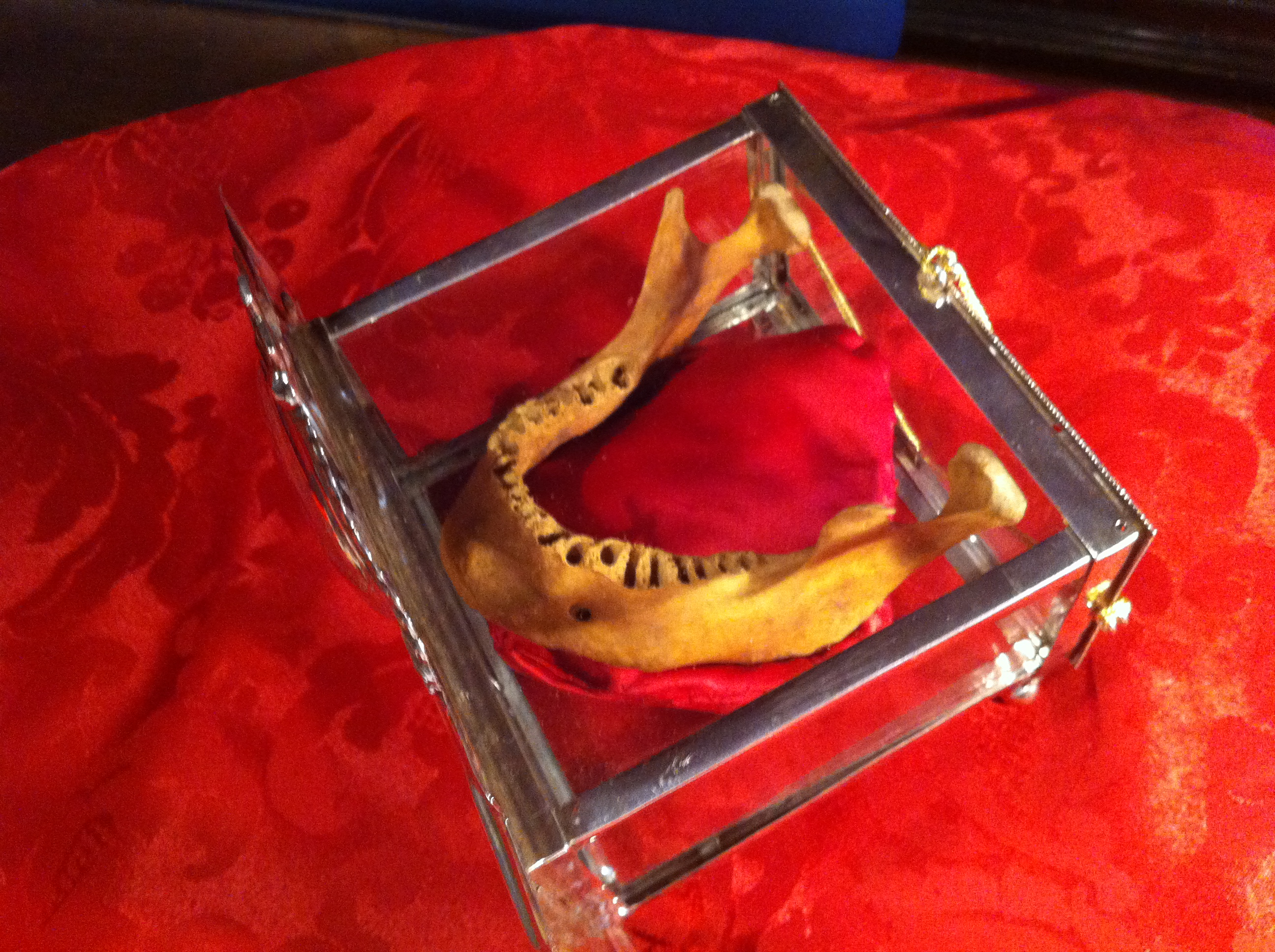
A relic of St. John of Ávila preserved in Almodóvar del Campo

Ávila was declared Venerable by Pope Clement XIII on 8 February 1759. He was beatified by Pope Leo XIII on 15 November 1894, and the cause for his canonization was opened on 14 March 1952. On 31 May 1970 he was canonized by Pope Paul VI.

Pope Benedict XVI named him a Doctor of the Church on 7 October 2012, the Feast of the Holy Rosary. The proclamation of the two new Doctors of the Church was made by Pope Benedict before tens of thousands of people in St. Peter's Square. During his homily, Pope Benedict said that John of Ávila was a "profound expert on the sacred Scriptures, he was gifted with an ardent missionary spirit. He knew how to penetrate in a uniquely profound way the mysteries of the redemption worked by Christ for humanity. A man of God, he united constant prayer to apostolic action. He dedicated himself to preaching and to the more frequent practice of the sacraments, concentrating his commitment on improving the formation of candidates for the priesthood, of religious and of lay people, with a view to a fruitful reform of the Church".

According to the Apostolic letter for the proclamation to Doctor of the Church, John of Ávila explained that "Christian spiritual life, as a participation in the life of the Blessed Trinity, begins with faith in the God who is Love, is grounded in God's goodness and mercy as expressed in the merits of Christ, and is wholly guided by the Spirit". More than a venerable professor, "Father Master Avila" was primarily a preacher and closely friend of Ignatius Loyola. John of Ávila authored a "prayerful and sapiential" theology, based on the "primacy of Christ and of grace in relation to the love of God, for which he showed "a profound knowledge of the Bible", without setting forth a systematic synthesis.

The Congregation for Divine Worship and the Discipline of the Sacraments fixed his optional memorial as 10 May.

== Works ==
=== English translations ===
- John of Avila, Audi, filia = Listen, O daughter, translated and introduced by Joan Frances Gormley; foreword by Francisco Javier Martínez Fernández, (New York: Paulist Press, 2006)
- Saint John of Ávila, My Burden Is Light: Suffering and Consolation in the Christian Life, compiled and translated by Brandon P. Otto (Gastonia, NC: TAN Books, 2024)
- St. John of Avila, Treatise on the Love of God and the Priesthood, (New York: IVE Press, 2012).

=== Spanish editions ===
- San Juan de Avila, Obras completas: Nueva edición crítica, vols 1–2, ed L Sala Balust and Francisco Martín Hernández, (Madrid: BAC, 2000-1) [the new critical edition of John's works]
- San Juan de Avila, Obras completas, vols 1–6, ed L Sala Balust and Francisco Martín Hernández, (Madrid: BAC, 1970)
- El Maestro Avila: Actas del Congreso Internacional, (Madrid: Conferencia Episcopal Española, 2000)
- Fray Luís de Granada, Vida del padre maestro Juan de Avila y las partes que ha de tener un predicador del evangelio, (Madrid: Edibesa, 2000)
