= Mario Baeza =

American academic

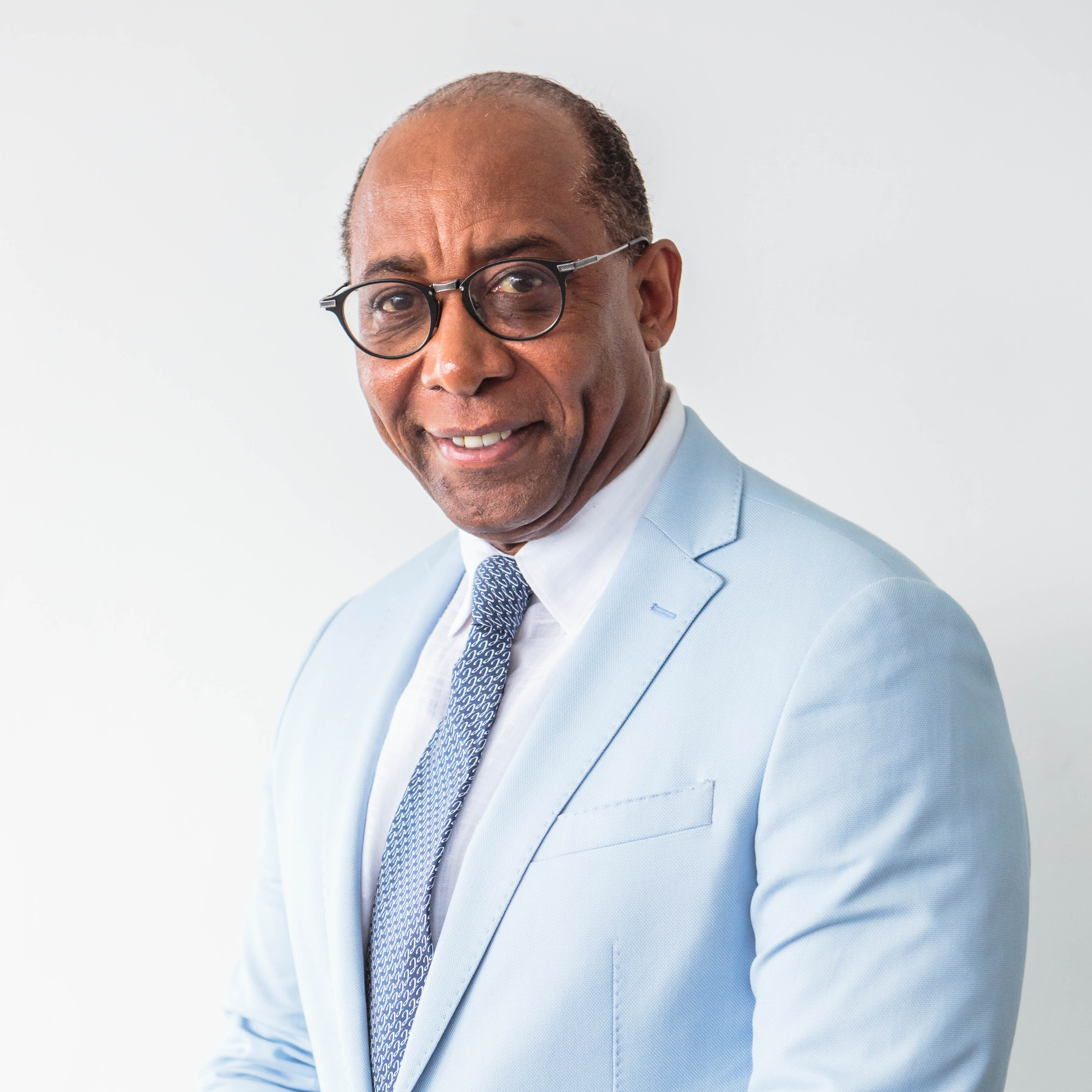
- Born: February 1, 1951 (age 75)
- Occupation: Corporate lawyer

Mario L. Baeza (born January 22, 1951) is a Cuban-American corporate lawyer, and investment and merchant banker firm. He is currently the founder and controlling shareholder of The Baeza Group LLC, the first U.S. Hispanic-owned merchant banking.

== Biography ==
At the age of seven, he and his family left Guanabacoa, Cuba, six months before Fidel Castro came to power.

He graduated Phi Beta Kappa in three years from Cornell University in 1971 and earned a Juris Doctor from Harvard Law School in 1974.

== Career ==
=== Law, private equity, investment and merchant-banking ===
From 1974 to 1994, Baeza was an associate and then, at the age of 31, became a partner of the international law firm of Debevoise & Plimpton where he specialized in domestic and international mergers and acquisitions, corporate finance and the negotiation and structuring of private equity funds and private equity investments. He became an expert on the use of employee stock ownership plans (ESOPs) as defensive tools in hostile takeovers. He founded and was the head of the firm's Latin America Group and, prior to that, its leveraged buyout practice, and its telecommunications and new technology practice. He was also the first Black or Latino to start as an associate in a major New York law firm and rise through the ranks to full partnership.

In 1994, Baeza founded and became controlling shareholder of Baeza & Co., the first U.S. Hispanic-owned merchant banking firm focusing on the Pan-Hispanic region. From 1994 to 1996, Baeza was a Managing Partner of Wasserstein Perella, President of Wasserstein Perella International Limited and Chairman and CEO of Grupo he Perella, a Latin America focused joint venture between Baeza & Co. and Wasserstein Perella.

In 1996, Baeza & Co. entered into a partnership with Trust Company of the West ("TCW"), a global asset manager with approximately $100 billion under management at the time, forming TCW/Latin America Partners ("TCW/LAP"). In 1997 TCW/LAP raised $300 million in committed funds and became one of the pioneering Latin America-focused private equity funds. Baeza & Co. provided the entire management team for TCW/LAP and the anchor investors for the funds TCW/LAP managed. Baeza was chairman and CEO of TCW/LAP from its inception until 2003 and as Chairman until 2006. TCW/LAP made controlling investments in Brazil, Argentina and Mexico in the food, telecom, financial services, retail beauty products, home construction materials and supplies, and the distribution and logistics sectors.

In 2003, Baeza formed The Baeza Group ("TBG"), a Hispanic-owned alternative investment firm specializing in the management of private equity investments targeting the U.S. Hispanic market and hedge fund products centered around global macro strategies. In 2004, TBG partnered with WNET/Thirteen to develop a PBS-quality Spanish language Television Network.

In 2011, Baeza formed Tropix Holdings, LLC, a merchant-banking firm making U.S.-authorized legal investments in Cuba, pending the complete lifting of the U.S. embargo. He remains the chairman and CEO of Tropix Holdings, LLC.

In 2012, Baeza founded Sitio Saludable, Inc and is its CEO.

=== Music ===
In 1992, Baeza, together with Wynton Marsalis, Gordon Davis, Albert Murray and Nat Leventhal, co-founded Jazz@Lincoln Center, which became a full constituent of Lincoln Center.

Baeza founded Hillside Broadcasting Corp., which acquired a controlling interest in WWAY-TV (Wilmington, N.C.) and KSLA-TV (Shrevesport, La.), both ABC television station affiliates, and significant interests in WKRS (FM) and WOR (AM) radio stations in New York City. All properties were later sold.

In 2000, Baeza formed AJM Records, LLC an independent record label that signed Ashanti, in a joint venture, with Universal/Def Jam/Murder Inc. Records. In 2004, AJM Records and Baeza Music Publishing were awarded two ASCAP awards for singles released on Ashanti's second album.
