= Lorenzo Sebastiani =

Italian rugby player (1988–2009)

- Born: 28 September 1988 L'Aquila
- Died: 6 April 2009 (aged 20) L'Aquila
- Height: 184 cm (72 in)
- Weight: 118 kg (260 lb)
- Occupation: Rugby union player

Rugby union career
- Position: Prop
Amateur team(s)
Years	Team	Apps	(Points)
2005-07	L'Aquila		
Senior career
Years	Team	Apps	(Points)
2009	L'Aquila	2	(0)
- Correct as of 9 April 2009

Lorenzo Sebastiani (28 September 1988 – 6 April 2009) was an Italian rugby union player who played prop for L'Aquila Rugby.

== Rugby career ==
Sebastiani was born in Aquila, Abruzzo, and entered the youth team of the local L'Aquila Rugby in 2005. As a newcomer in the National U-18 squad in 2005, he took part to the FIRA youth European Championship getting the 3rd place, and then, with the Under-19 team, won the Division B World Championship category. On 23 December 2007 he made his debut in serie A, against Rugby Badia.

== Earthquake and memorial ==
At the moment of his death Sebastiani was a guest of a teammate. The house was shaken by the earthquake that hit L'Aquila on 6 April 2009 and he died when the house collapsed.

In his memory the Italian Rugby Federation named after him the Centre- and Southern Italy's branch of the Youth Rugby Academy which is based in Rome.

Dedications to Lorenzo Sebastiani include:

- 2009 : Indoor stadium of Rocca di Mezzo "Lorenzo Sebastiani"
- since 2011 : Annual rugby memorial tournament "Lorenzo Sebastiani" in L'Aquila
- 2013 : A park in San Donà di Piave, in Veneto, has been renamed Parco Lorenzo Sebastiani.
