= Baeza Cathedral =

Coordinates: 37°59′34″N 3°28′08″W

Baeza Cathedral Catedral de la Natividad de Nuestra Señora de Baeza
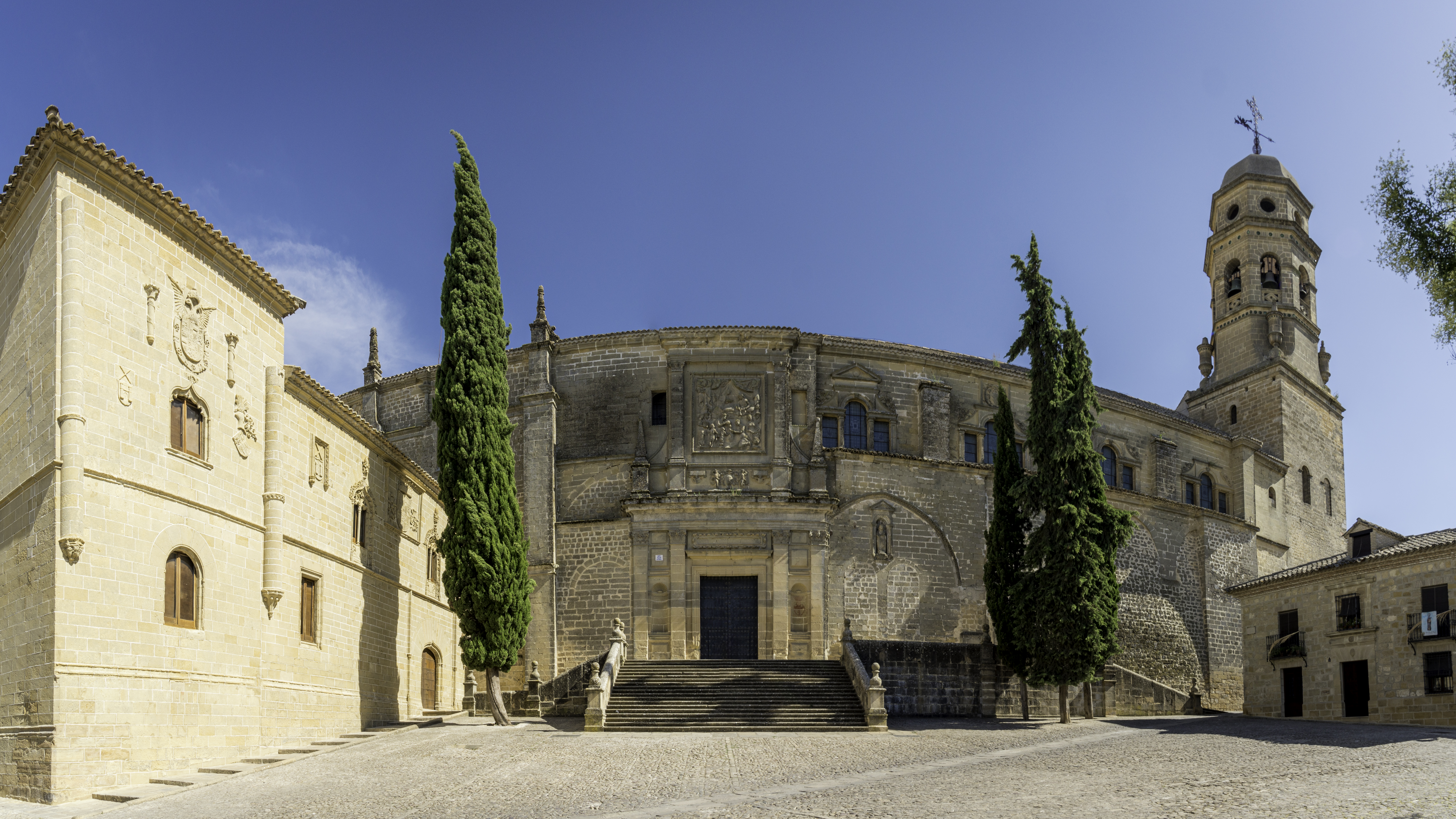
- Fisheye panorama of the Southern façade.
- Baeza Cathedral; Catedral de la Natividad de Nuestra Señora de Baeza
- Location: Baeza, Spain
- Country: Spain
- Denomination: Roman Catholicism

History
- Founder: Siglo XIV - Siglo XVI

Architecture
- Architectural type: church
- Style: Renaissance, Gothic

The Former Cathedral of Baeza (Spanish: Catedral de Baeza), or in full the Cathedral of the Assumption of the Virgin of Baeza (Spanish: Catedral de la Asunción de la Virgen) (?formerly Catedral de la Natividad de Nuestra Señora de Baeza), is a Roman Catholic church in Baeza, Andalusia, southern Spain. The cathedral is located in the Plaza de Santa Maria.

== History ==
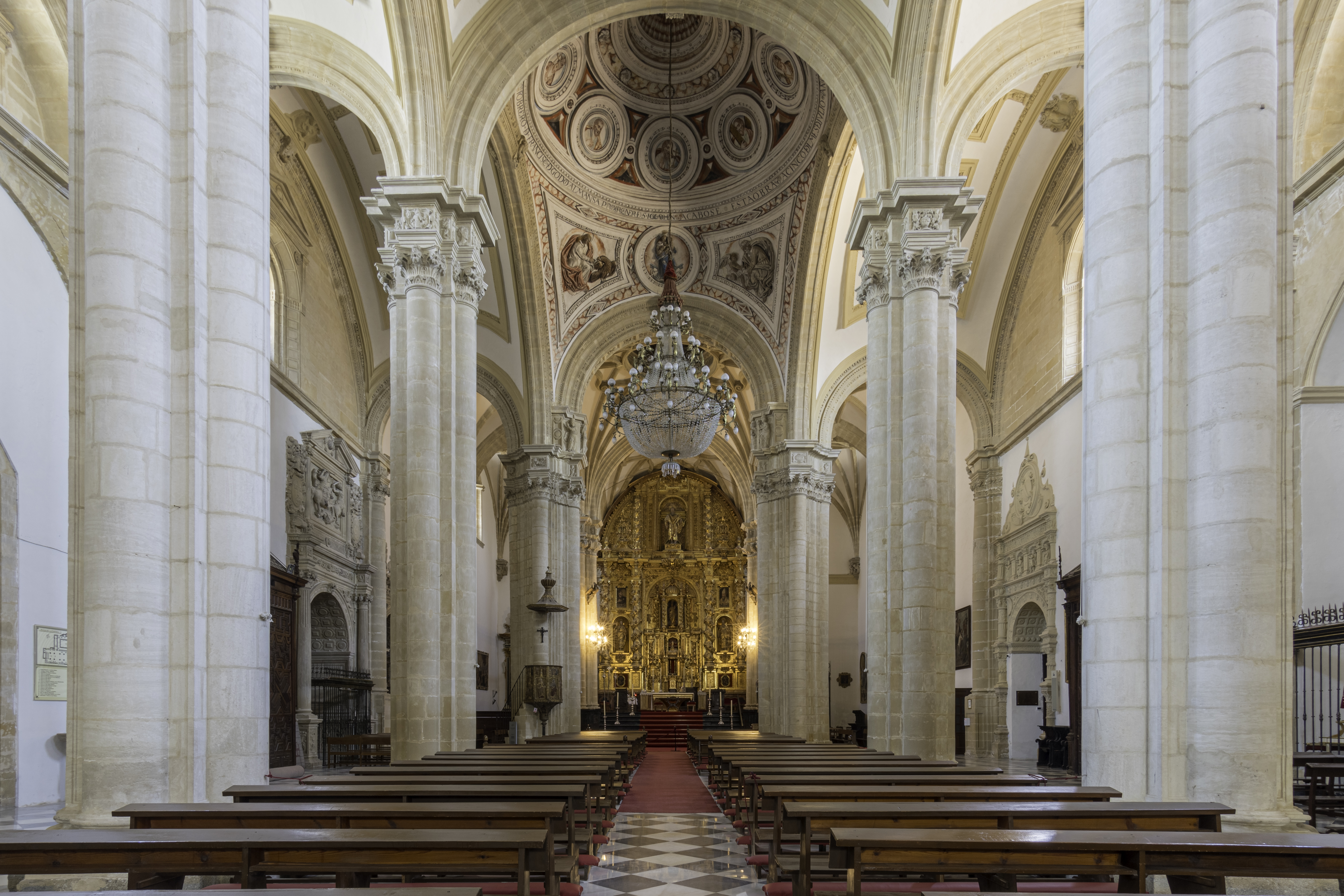
Central nave.

It was the cathedral episcopal see of the Roman Catholic Diocese of Baeza, which has a Visigothic period, was suppressed after some time under Moorish rule and was shortly restored after the Reconquista under the Kingdom of Castile in the thirteenth century, but suppressed for good, never again to regain (co-)cathedral status.

The church is built on the site of the former major mosque of the city. In the Muslim era, Ibn al-Abbar mentions that once upon a time, a judge by the name of Ali bin Abdur Rahman Al-Himyari (d.~560 A.H/1166) was the chief imam and orator of the major mosque - see entry 2745 of Takmilah. His tenure as imam possibly may have coincided with Alfonso VII’s capture of the mosque in 1147 and his temporary conversion of it to a cathedral.

The site, like the land, alternated between mosque and church during 12th and 13th centuries. The apse still maintains Gothic tracery, but in the 16th-century a major reconstruction by Andrés de Vandelvira in Renaissance-style created the present church. The construction of the cathedral finally ended in 1593, shortly after the death of Andrés de Vandelvira.

The church forms part of a UNESCO World Heritage Site with other monuments in Baeza and in the nearby city of Úbeda. The cathedral was one of 100 nominees to be voted as the 12 Treasures of Spain in 2007. It's also listed among the Shrines in the Extraordinary Jubilee of Mercy.

== Sources and external links ==
- GCatholic - former cathedral, with Google satellite photo/map
- Baeza Cathedral Official Website
