= Juan Orozco =

Spanish luthier

Juan Orozco (14 April 1937 – February 15, 2020) was a Spanish luthier and guitar impresario who lived in New York from 1965 to 1995, where he had a famous guitar shop at 156, 56th Street in the 1970s to 1990s.

He is the third in a family of guitar makers (his father, Juan Orozco, built guitars in Spain, Uruguay and Brazil). He was actively involved in the development of classic guitars in the mid-1970s (starting as early as 1969) together with great Japanese luthiers like Matsuoka, Tamura, Masaki Sakurai and Yairi, who then developed guitars for Tama, Ibanez and Aria (at that time the small workshop where they worked was in the company Hoshino Gakki who own Tama and Ibanez). They also built guitars in the Kohno-Sakurai style (models #8, #10, #15) that were sold with the "Juan Orozco, Luthier" label. Later the Orozco guitars were equipped with a very characteristic headstock, different from the Fleta-style headstocks they had first. In the majority of user reviews, the majestic volume and sonorous bass sound of Juan Orozco guitars are emphasised.

Juan Orozco III is still active in the guitar business, in particular with the "Aranjuez" strings that he developed, and guitar cases. He also organised guitar concerts and is well known by many great guitar players and luthiers.

== Achievements ==
The granting of the cross of officer of the Order of Civil Merit on 24 June 1977.

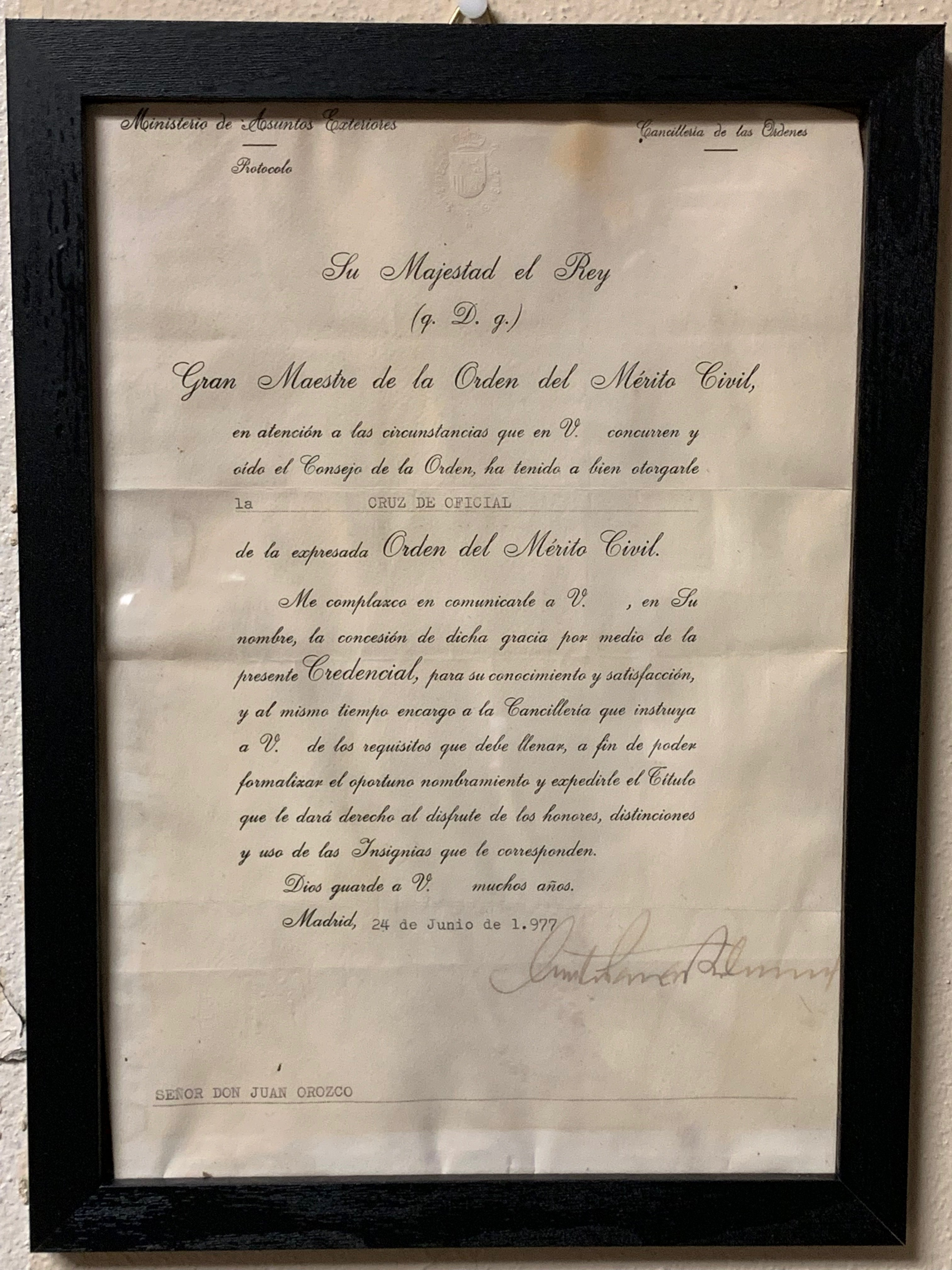
Officer's Cross of the Order of Civil Merit

== Orozco guitar on record ==
- Spirits (album) - Keith Jarrett, ECM Records 1333/34, 1986.
