= Baeza, Spain =

Baeza
- Municipality
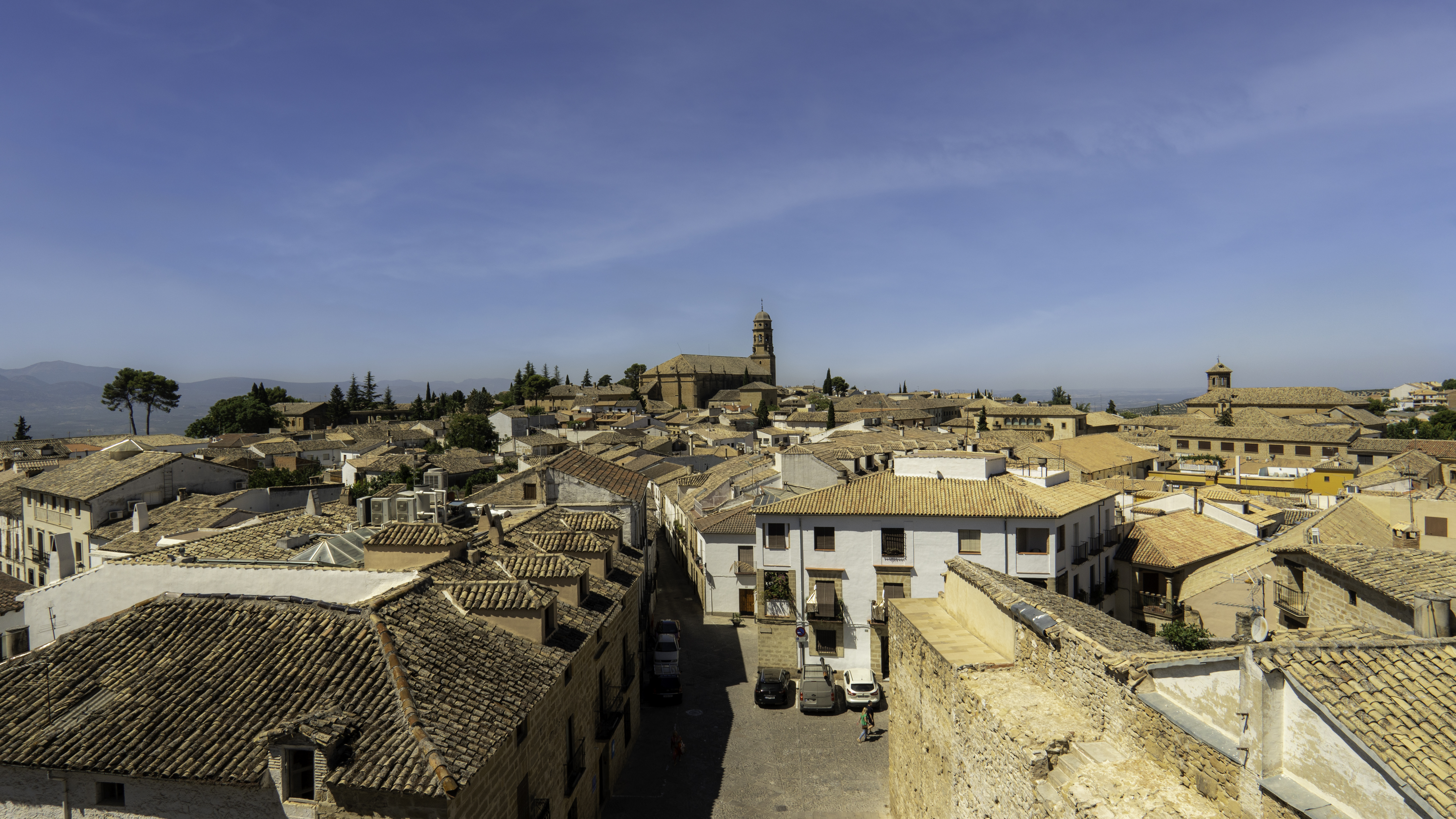
- Skyline, with the Cathedral at the centre.

- Flag Coat of arms
- Interactive map of Baeza
- Coordinates: 37°59′N 3°28′W
- Country: Spain
- Autonomous community: Andalusia
- Province: Jaén

Government
  - Mayor: Pedro Javier Cabrera Rentero (PP)

Area
  - Total: 194.3 km^{2} (75.0 sq mi)
- Elevation: 769 m (2,523 ft)

Population (2025-01-01)
  - Total: 15,575
  - Density: 80.16/km^{2} (207.6/sq mi)
- Demonym: Baezanos
- Time zone: UTC+1 (CET)
  - Summer (DST): UTC+2 (CEST)
- Postal code: 23440
- Website: Official website

UNESCO World Heritage Site
- Part of: Renaissance Monumental Ensembles of Úbeda and Baeza
- Criteria: Cultural: (ii), (iv)
- Reference: 522rev-002
- Inscription: 2003 (27th Session)
- Area: 4.8 ha (12 acres)
- Buffer zone: 176 ha (430 acres)

Baeza (Note: Formerly also rendered as 'Baéza' and 'Baeça'.) (Spanish pronunciation: [baˈeθa]) is a city and municipality of Spain belonging to the province of Jaén, in the autonomous community of Andalusia. It is part of the comarca of La Loma. The present name was established in Roman times as Vivatia, then Biatia by the Visigoths, Bayyasa by the Moors from the 8th century onwards; until it became Baeza.

It is now principally famed for having some of the best-preserved examples of Italian Renaissance architecture in Spain. Along with neighbouring Úbeda, it was added to UNESCO's list of World Heritage Sites in 2003. The former Visigothic bishopric of Baeza remains a Latin Catholic titular see.

== Geography ==
The town lies perched on a cliff in the range (the Loma de Úbeda) separating the Guadalquivir River to its south from the Guadalimar to its north.

== History ==
The town stands at a high elevation about 3 miles (4.8 km) from the right bank of the Guadalquivir in the Loma de Úbeda. Under the Romans, the town was known as 'Beatia'. Following its conquest by the Visigoths, Beatia was the seat of a bishopric of Baeza (viz.). From the beginning of the seventh century it was conquered by several Arab and berber states during the Al-Andalus period, being named Bayyasa.

The Christian diocese was reestablished in 1127 or 1147 following the town's conquest by Alfonso VII of Castile, but it was then again reconquered by the Almohads. After the Battle of Las Navas de Tolosa, Ferdinand III of Castile in 1227 retook the city and gave it the Fuero de Cuenca, a legislative body, to facilitate the new Castilian order and institutions.

The takeover of the city as Ibn Himyari recounts in Rawdul Mu'taar was not a simple conquest but a case of treachery and ignominy for the Muslims. Al Bayyasi, the local ruler had gifted the citadel of Baeza as a pawn for his promise to later hand Ferdinand III the forts of Capilla, Banos de La Encina and Salvatierra. When he himself was assassinated by the Cordobans for his alliance with the Christians, the governor of Jaén arrived in Baeza on the request of its inhabitants and killed any Christian troops in the city but those in the citadel, due to the fortifications, refused to surrender. Fearing retaliation from Castile's troops, the governor then left, leaving a choice for the Baezans to either stay or leave. Hence the Muslim population was forced to leave Baeza once and for all, after a garrison to protect them against Ferdinand III's expansionist ambitions was now non-existent.

For the rest of the middle ages, Baeza remained together with Jaén, Úbeda and Andújar among the dominant cities in the Kingdom of Jaén, although the 1248 conquest of Jaén tended to favour the fortunes of that city, that enjoyed a strategic location vis-à-vis the Kingdom of Granada.

The most important crops were those of cereal, complemented by the likes of grapevines, olive, and almond. Olive crops, far from the current-day olive monoculture, suffered from the mid-fifteenth century onward due to the cultivation of sumac.

The diocese of Baeza was merged with Jaén in 1248 or 1249, but was later nominally restored as a titular see of the Roman Catholic Church. With it, a University was founded as well, which shaped the cultural personality of the city over the following centuries. Also, two powerful families, Benavides and Carvajales, competed for power and determined the historical evolution of the city, which required the intervention of Isabel I of Castile at the end of the fifteenth century.

By the early 16th century, the jurisdiction of Baeza extended beyond the city proper to the hamlets of Begíjar, Lupión, Ibros, Rus, Vílchez, Bailén, Baños, Linares and Castro.

The sixteenth century was the golden era of Baeza (and nearby Úbeda). It grew rich from several industries, notably textiles, and the noble families, which were well connected with the Spanish Imperial state. They hired major architects of the era (including Andrés de Vandelvira) to design the present cathedral, churches, public buildings, and private palaces in the then-fashionable Italian style. The town's university building dates to 1533. The city declined in importance in the seventeenth century, with the only remaining industry consisting of local production of grain and olive oil. As few newer structures were built during this period, this had the effect of preserving the town's Renaissance legacy. The university closed for a time before being reopened by the nineteenth century as a seminary. In the 1870s, the population was around 11,000; over the next few decades, the Linares–Almeria railway was constructed nearby and town's population grew to 14,000 by 1900.

== Landmarks ==
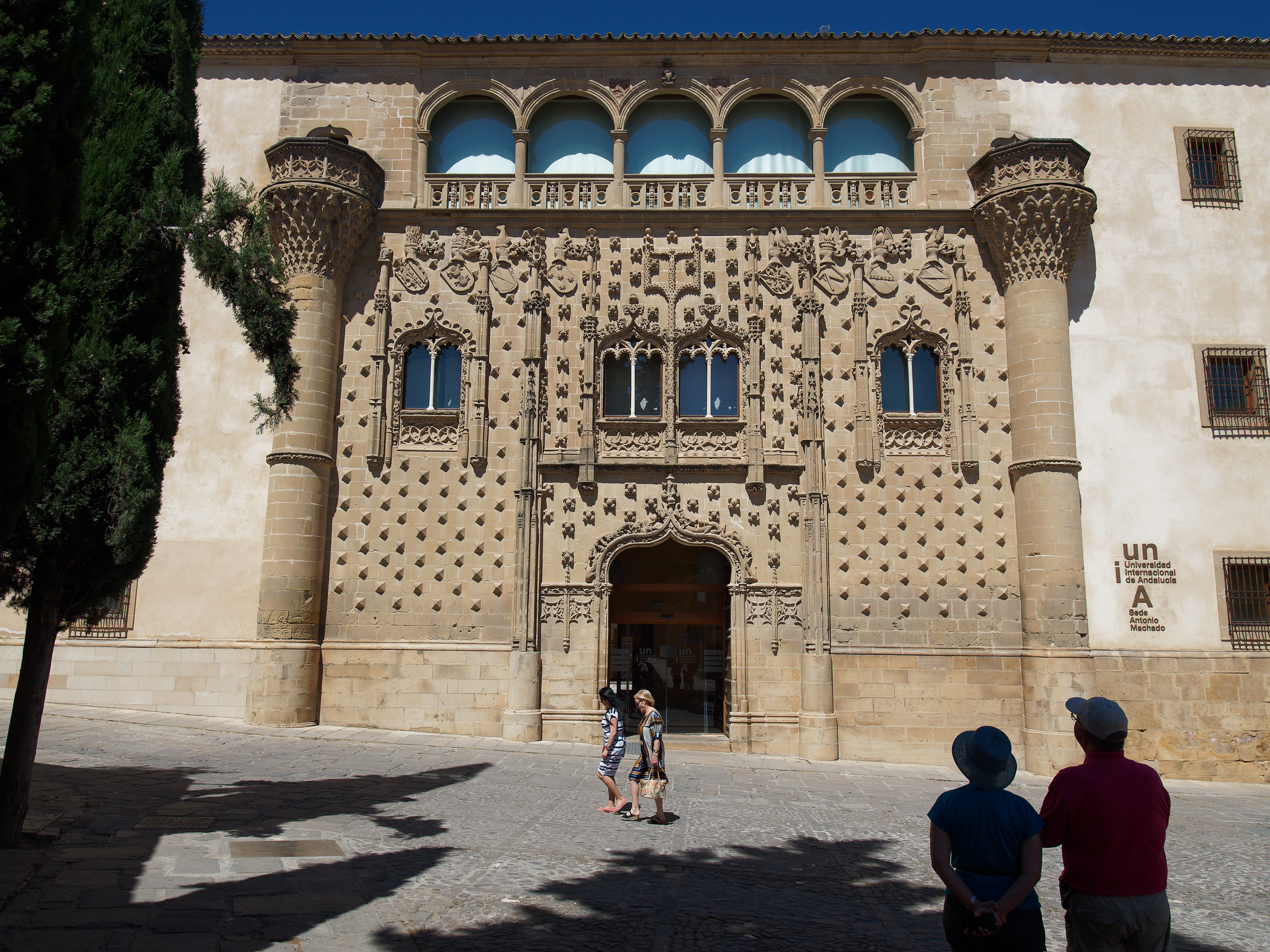
Jabalquinto Palace

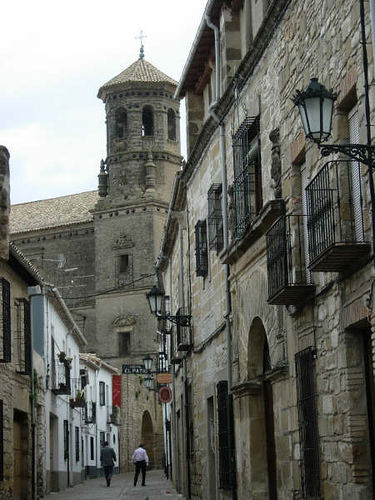

Baeza still houses several historic public buildings:

- Natividad de Nuestra Señora Cathedral, presents an early Gothic and Plateresque pilasters and crossed vaults finished in the sixteenth century in a Renaissance style by renamed architect Andrés de Vandelvira, and since 1584 by architect and mathematician Juan Bautista Villalpando. The tower was redone in 1549 and the Chapel of St Michael was added in 1560.
- Town Hall (Ayuntamiento), a Plateresque building originally built as a combined courthouse and prison, leading to two separate main entrances
- Baeza University, established in 1533 or 1538, now a secondary school
- Santa Cruz Church, a Romanesque church with a two-aisle nave and semicircular apse. A side wall incorporates a Visigothic arch.
- St Paul's Church, a Gothic church with a Renaissance portal with a two-aisle nave and Gothic chapels. Includes the tomb of Pablo de Olavide.
- The Chapel of St Francis, in the ruins of a Renaissance building from 1538 formerly used as a monastery
- Jabalquinto Palace (Palacio de Jabalquinto), including a Gothic entrance flanked by two cylindrical pilasters with Plateresque capitals with mocárabes ornamentation, a Renaissance courtyard, and a Baroque staircase
- Spain Plaza (Plaza de España)
- Constitution Plaza (Plaza or Paseo de la Constitucíon), including a marble fountain decorated with Caryatides
- St Mary Fountain (1564)
- The Fountain of the Lions, from the Ibero-Roman ruins of Cástulo and possibly representing Himilce, wife of the Carthaginian general Hannibal
- The Úbeda Gate and Jaén Gate.
- The Villalar Arch (Arco de Villalar), erected for Charles V's 1526 visit to honor his 1521 victory at Villalar.
- Seminary oratorio of St Philip Neri (1660)

== Transport ==
Baeza is 327 km (203 mi) south of Madrid by highway. The Linares–Baeza Renfe railway station is 15 km (9 mi) away to the southwest; it lies on the Linares-Almeria line. There are bus connections to Granada, Málaga, and Madrid. Granada (132 km or 82 mi) and Málaga (241 km or 150 mi) are the nearest international airports.

== Notable locals ==
- Saro of Baeza, (c. 862) bishop
- Domingo of Baeza, (1236–1249), bishop Dominican friar, and former bishop of Marocco from 1225 – 1236
- St John of Ávila (1499–1569), Christian mystic.
- Gaspar Becerra (1520–1568), sculptor and painter.
- St John of the Cross (1542–1591), Christian mystic.
- Ginés Martínez de Aranda (1556-1620), designer of the Fountain of Mary in the square of Baeza. He also contributed to some of the works of the Cathedral of Baeza.
- Pablo de Olavide (1725–1803), politician, lawyer and writer.
- Antonio Machado (1875–1939), modernist poet, wrote Juan de Mairena inspired by his time in Baeza (1912–1919)

== International relations ==
Baeza is twinned with:

- Carcassonne, France

== Gallery ==
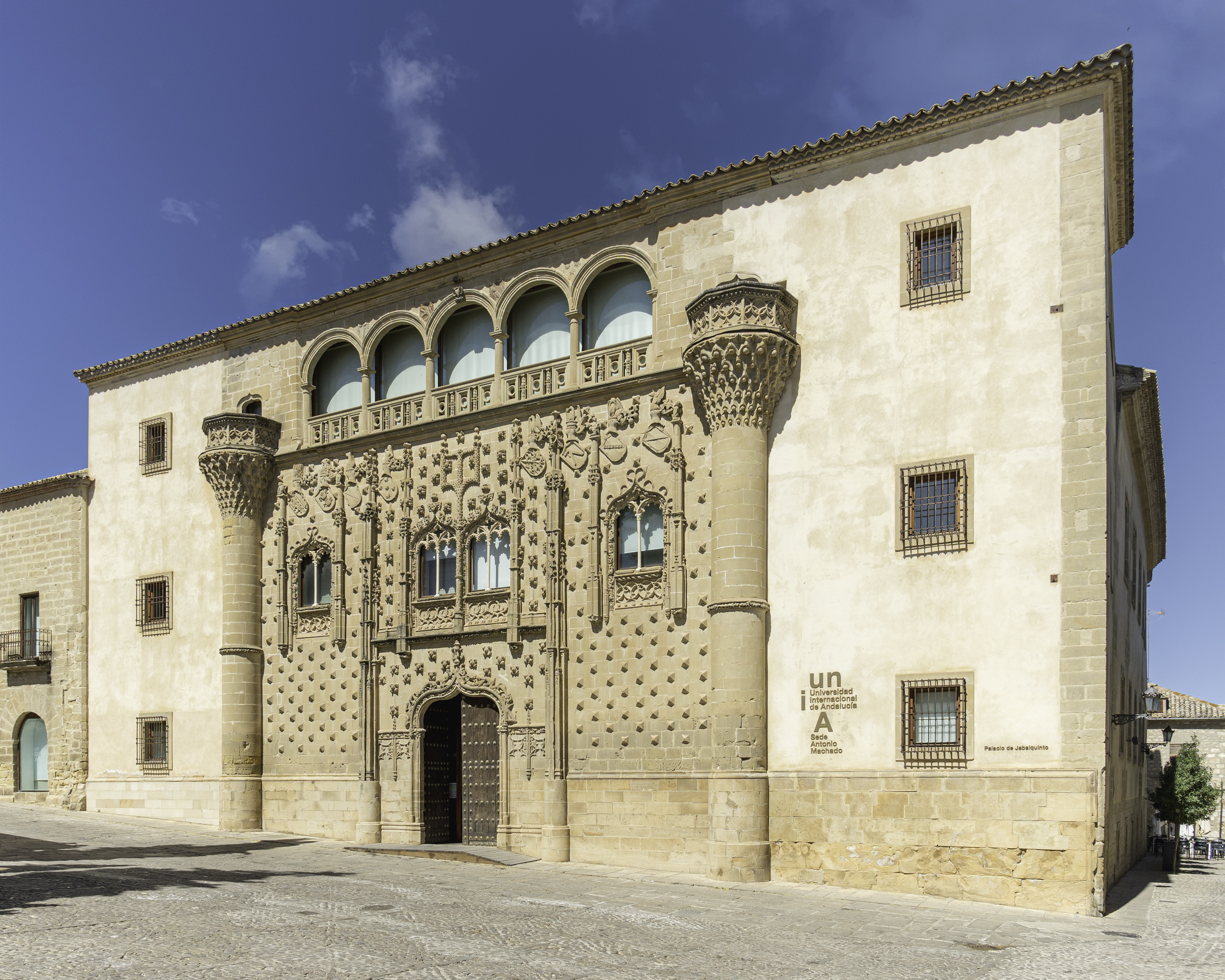
Palacio de Jabalquinto

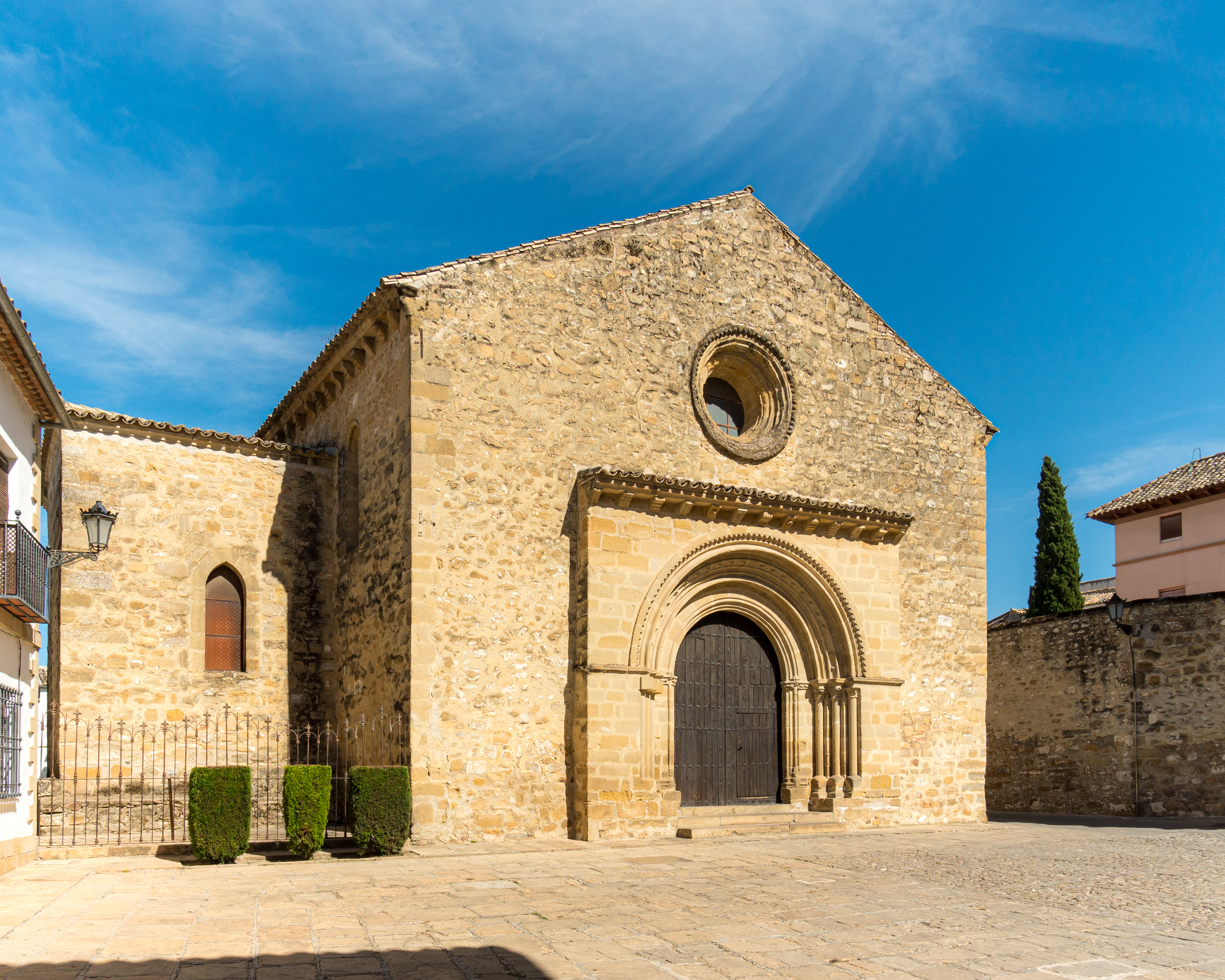
Iglesia de la Santa Cruz

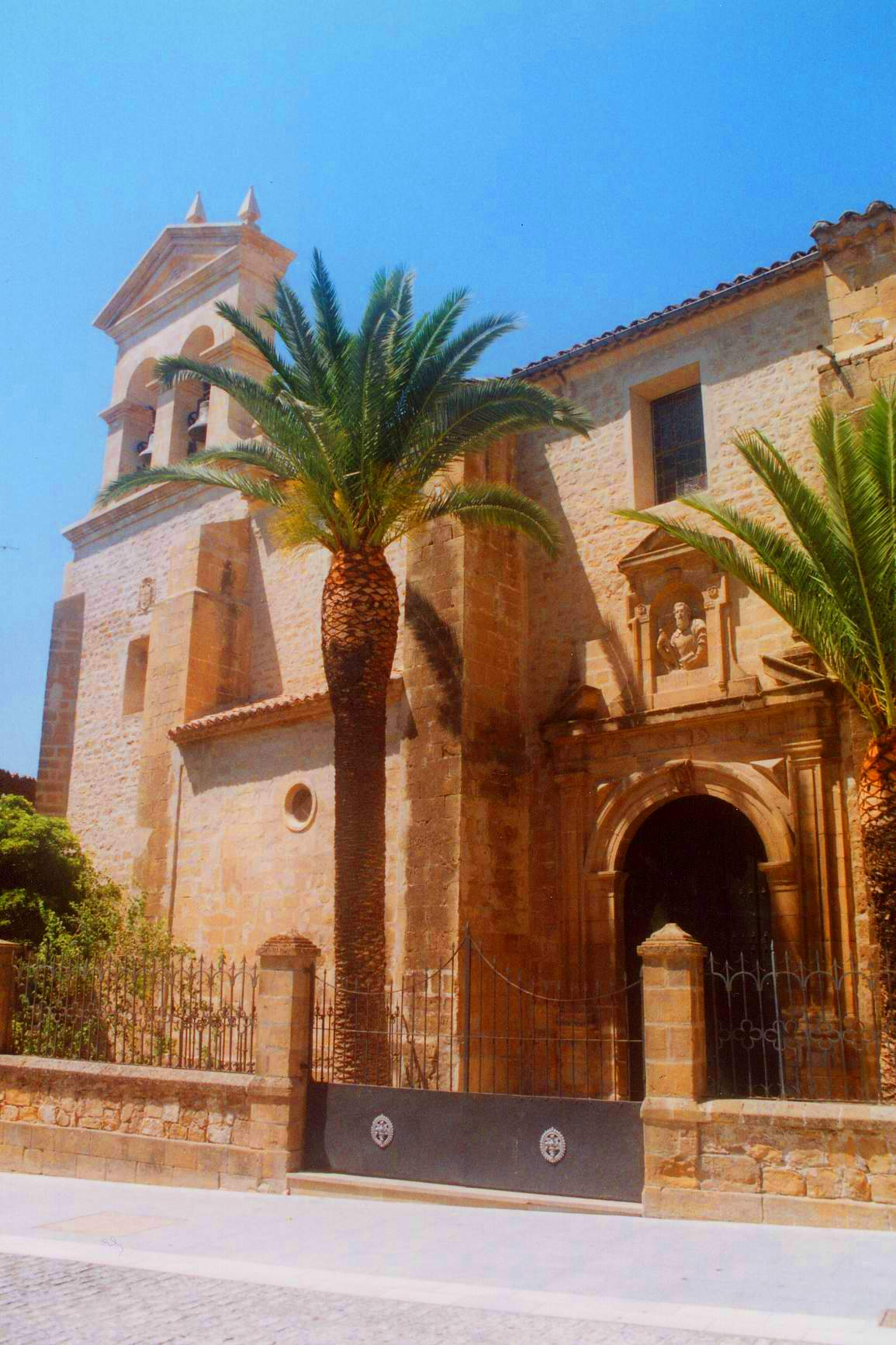
Iglesia de San Pablo

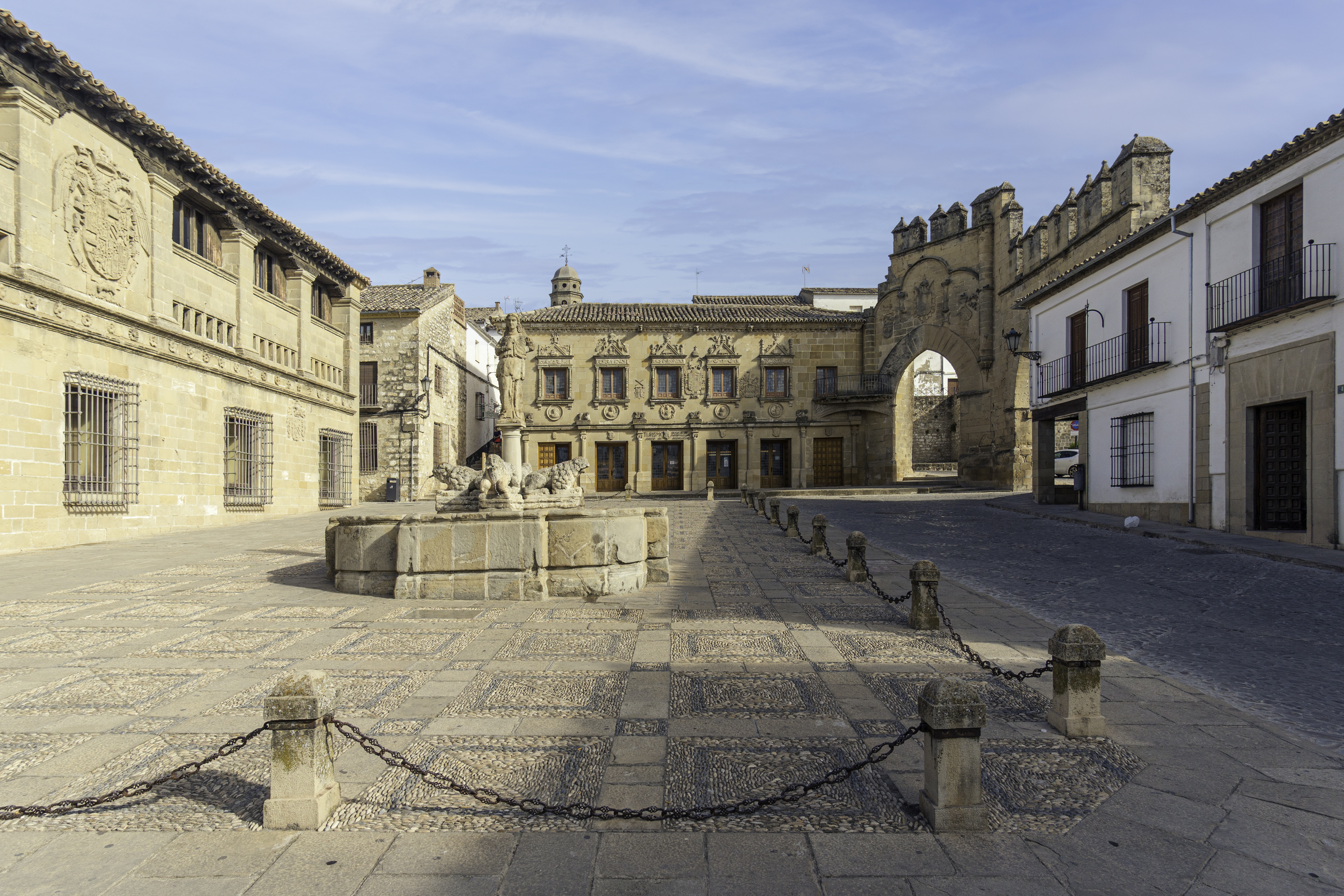
Plaza del Pópulo

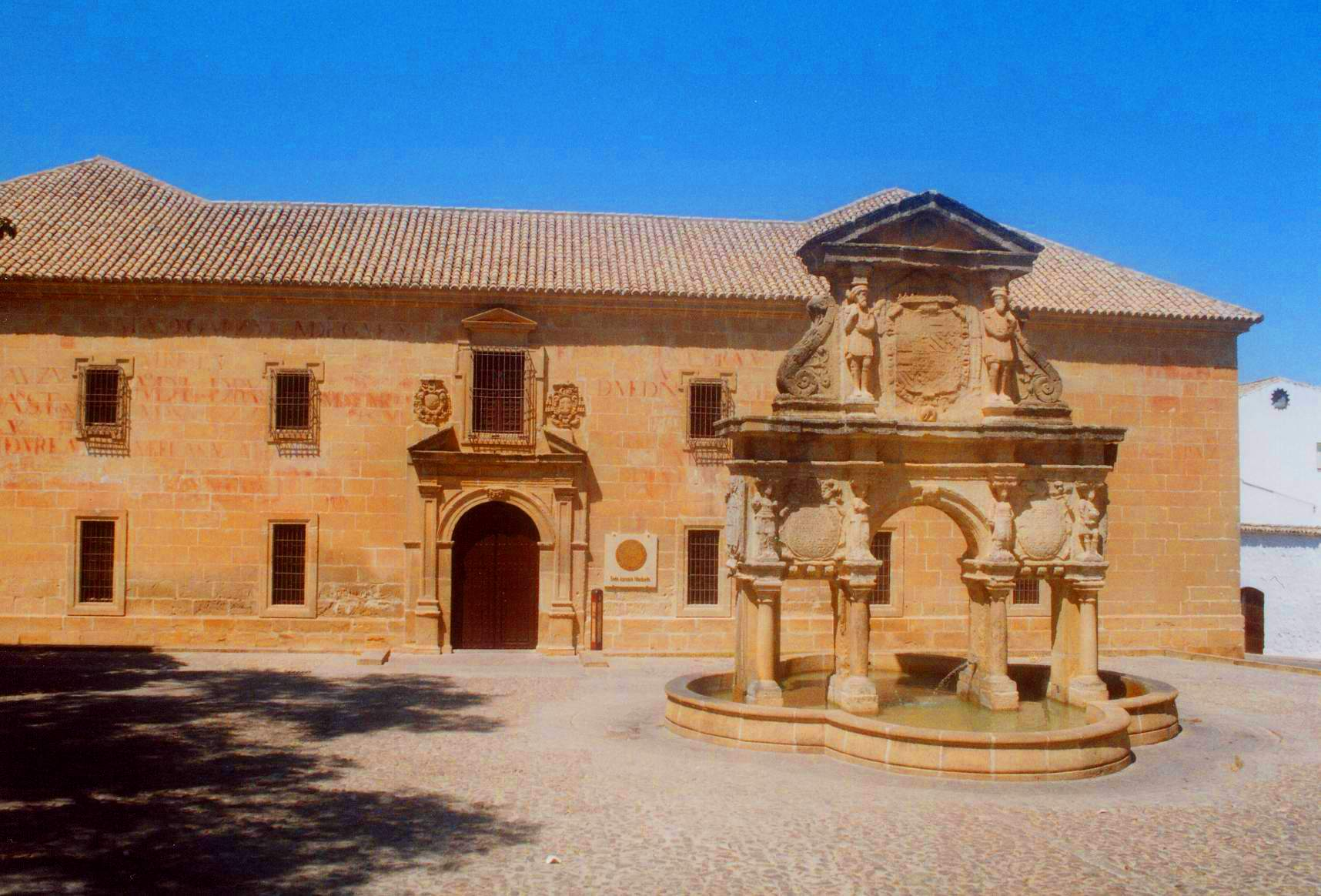
Fuente de Santa Maria

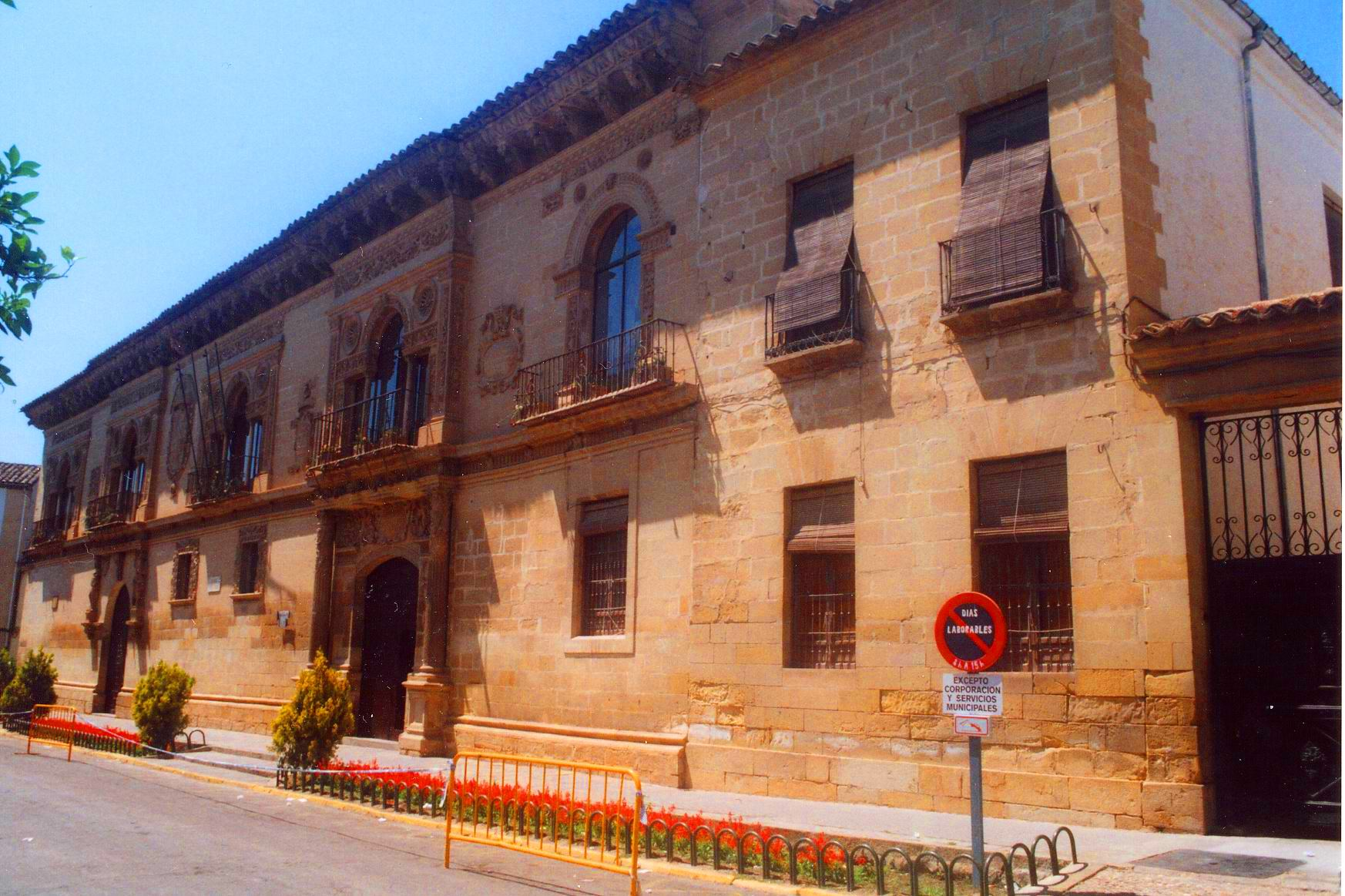
Ayuntamiento

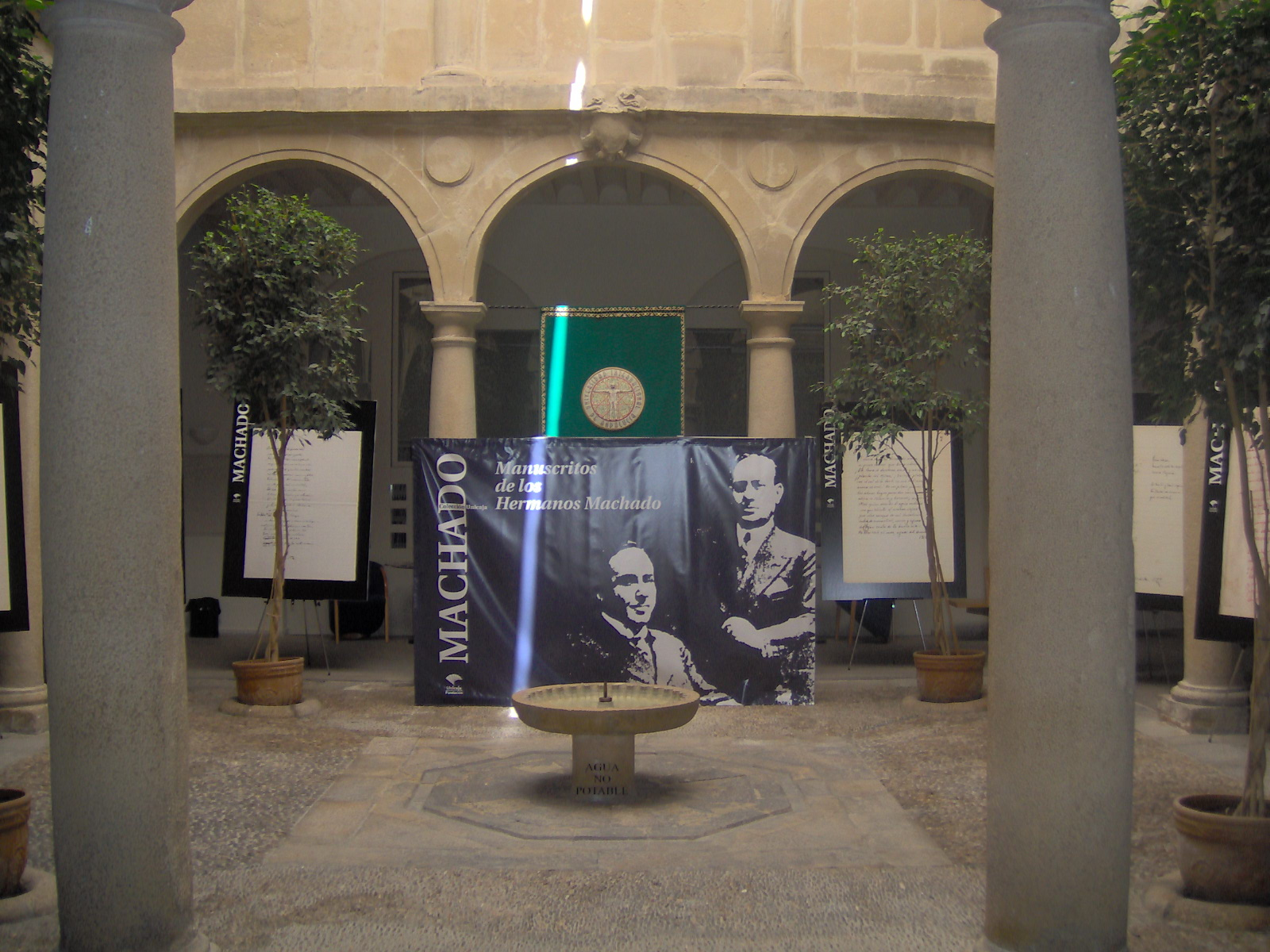
Council Seminary cloister, from Antonio Machado headquarter of International University of Andalusia

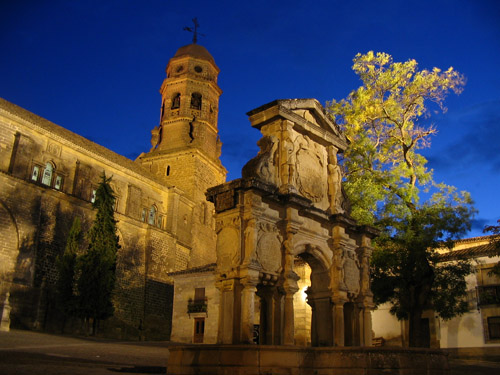
Santa María fountain and cathedral of Baeza

== See also ==
- Roman Catholic Diocese of Baeza

== Sources and external links ==
- Official site for the municipal government
- "Renaissance Monumental Ensembles of Úbeda and Baeza", World Heritage Sites, UNESCO
- Ubeda and Baeza site
- Baeza, Spanish Ministry of Education, Culture and Sport
- "Baeza", GigaCatholic
- Romanesque church at Baeza
- Image Gallery of Baeza
- Baeza eGuide
- ebaeza.com eBaeza guide

=== Bibliography ===
- Argente del Castillo, Carmen; Rodríguez Molina, José (1987). "La ciudad de Baeza a través de sus ordenanzas". En la España Medieval (10). Madrid: Ediciones Complutense: 323–342. ISSN 0214-3038.
- Baynes, T. S., ed. (1878), "Baeza" , Encyclopædia Britannica, vol. 3 (9th ed.), New York: Charles Scribner's Sons, p. 229
- Chisholm, Hugh, ed. (1911), "Baena" , Encyclopædia Britannica, vol. 3 (11th ed.), Cambridge University Press, p. 191
