= Siege of Setenil =

Siege of Setenil de las Bodegas (1407)
- Part of the Spanish Reconquista
Date	5–25 October 1407
Location	Setenil de las Bodegas
Result	Granadan victory

Belligerents
Crown of Castile	Emirate of Granada

Commanders and leaders
Ferdinand of Antequera	Unknown

Strength
Three cannons	Unknown

Casualties and losses
Unknown	Unknown

The siege of Setenil was military engagement between the Castilians and the Moors of Granada. The Castilians besieged the town of Setenil, near Ronda. The siege lasted for 20 days and ended in failure for Castile.

== Background ==
In 1407, the Castilian regent Ferdinand prepared a crusade against the Granadans. However, in June, he fell ill, and the campaign had to be postponed. In September, Ferdinand was healed. He began preparations; he entered the chapel of the kings and took the sword from the hand of the statue of Ferdinand III of Castile. His campaign aimed to capture Ronda, which was the heart of a network of adjacent castles.

On September 26, the Castilians laid siege to Zahara de la Sierra. Using three large cannons, they breached the walls. Four days later, the town surrendered and the Granadans were allowed to depart unharmed. After this, Ferdinand dispatched a force to scout Ronda; however, after they returned, they reported the city was well fortified. Ferdinand wanted to attack, but his nobles argued against that; instead, they turned to Setenil de las Bodegas.

== Siege ==
Ferdinand arrived at Setenil on October 5, and he began setting the guns to bombard the fort. The cannoneers had difficulty finding the range; some projectiles missed their targets, and others created friendly fire, wounding Castilians. Within a few weeks, the Castilians ran out of stones, so each man had to carry a limited number of stones to fire. The Granadans held out, repairing damages done to the walls. The Castilians then assaulted the walls using wooden towers; however, just before it reaches the walls, the wheels of the towns catch in a ditch, unable to move. Many began deserting due to lack of payment and food. As winter was approaching, Ferdinand decided to raise the siege on the 25th, taunted by the Moors.

== Aftermath ==
Despite being warmly welcomed, the campaign was a failure, with such a large army and quantities to assault Ronda, yet the Castilians were bogged down at the walls of Setenil. This was due to delay of the campaign, shortage of supplies and money, and lack of coordination between the nobles.

== Sources ==
- Joseph F. O’Callaghan (2014), The Last Crusade in the West: Castile and the Conquest of Granada.
- Andrew Wheatcroft (2004), Infidels, A History of the Conflict Between Christendom and Islam.
