= Alcalá del Valle =

- Municipality
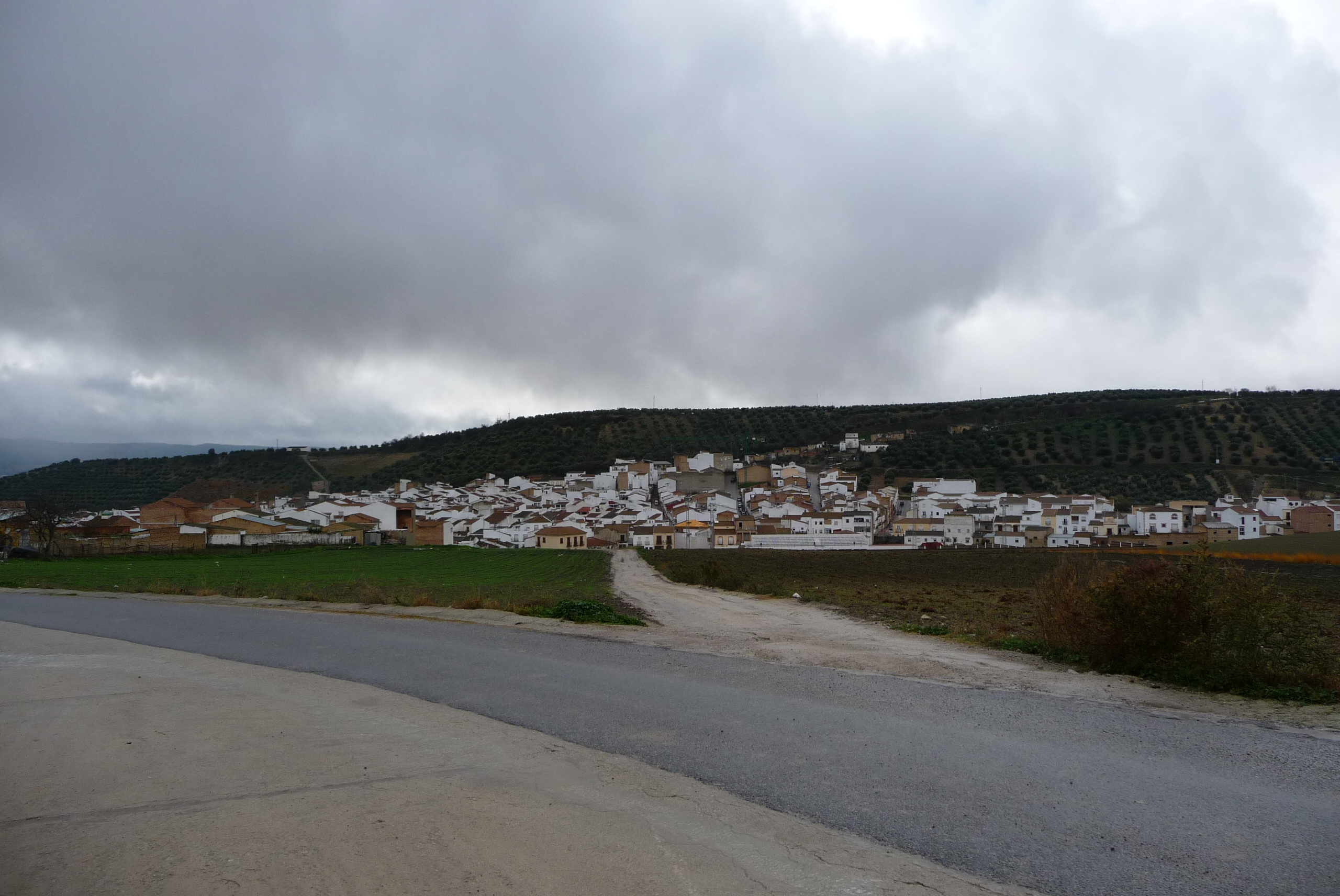

- Flag Coat of arms

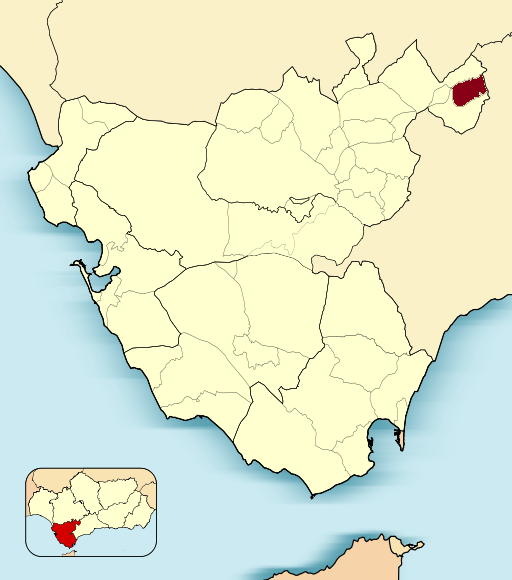
- Municipal location in the Province of Cádiz

- Location in Andalusia Location in Spain
- Coordinates: 36°54′N 5°10′W
- Country: Spain
- Autonomous community: Andalusia
- Province: Cádiz
- Comarca: Sierra de Cádiz

Government
  - Alcalde: Dolores Caballero Flores (IU)

Area
  - Total: 46.89 km^{2} (18.10 sq mi)
- Elevation: 628 m (2,060 ft)

Population (2025-01-01)
  - Total: 4,864
  - Density: 103.7/km^{2} (268.7/sq mi)
- Demonyms: Alcalareño, ña
- Time zone: UTC+1 (CET)
  - Summer (DST): UTC+2 (CEST)
- Postal code: 11693
- Dialing code: (+34) 956
- Website: alcaladelvalle.com

Alcalá del Valle is a city located in the province of Cádiz, Spain. According to the 2006 census, the city has a population of 5,355.

It is the last village along the Route of the White Villages, it serves as a bridge between the provinces of Cádiz and Málaga and also between the two national coasts, the Costa de la Luz and the Costa del Sol. Located in a valley crossed by numerous creeks that supply its inhabitants with fresh water, the village of Alcalá del Valle has views of the local natural environment, including nature reserves such as Tomillos or Las Errizas.

It has an important historical heritage, thanks to its "Mannerist-style" buildings. Local restaurants offer a variety of Mediterranean cuisine.

== Geography limits ==
- To North: Sierra de Mollina, Cerro de la Atalaya and the Arroyo de Tomillo
- To South: the town, Setenil de las Bodegas;
- To East: the Serranía de Ronda;
- To West: the Guadalporcún river and Torre Alháquime.

== Monuments and sights ==
- Iglesia de Santa María del Valle

It is a baroque-style church dedicated to the patron of Alcalá. It was built between 17th and 18th century. The interior is divided into three naves separated by large archways. The facade has a stepped design with a bell tower and a clock. The church possessed different pieces of work, like La Tabla del Milagro, which was brought there during the reconstruction of Caños Santos and El Cristo de la Buena Muerte.

- Ermita del Cristo de la Misericordia

This chapel is dedicated to Lord of Mercy. It is home to one of the brotherhoods, the "coloraos". It is considered as a place of worship for locals.

- Grupo dolménico de la Dehesa del Tomillo

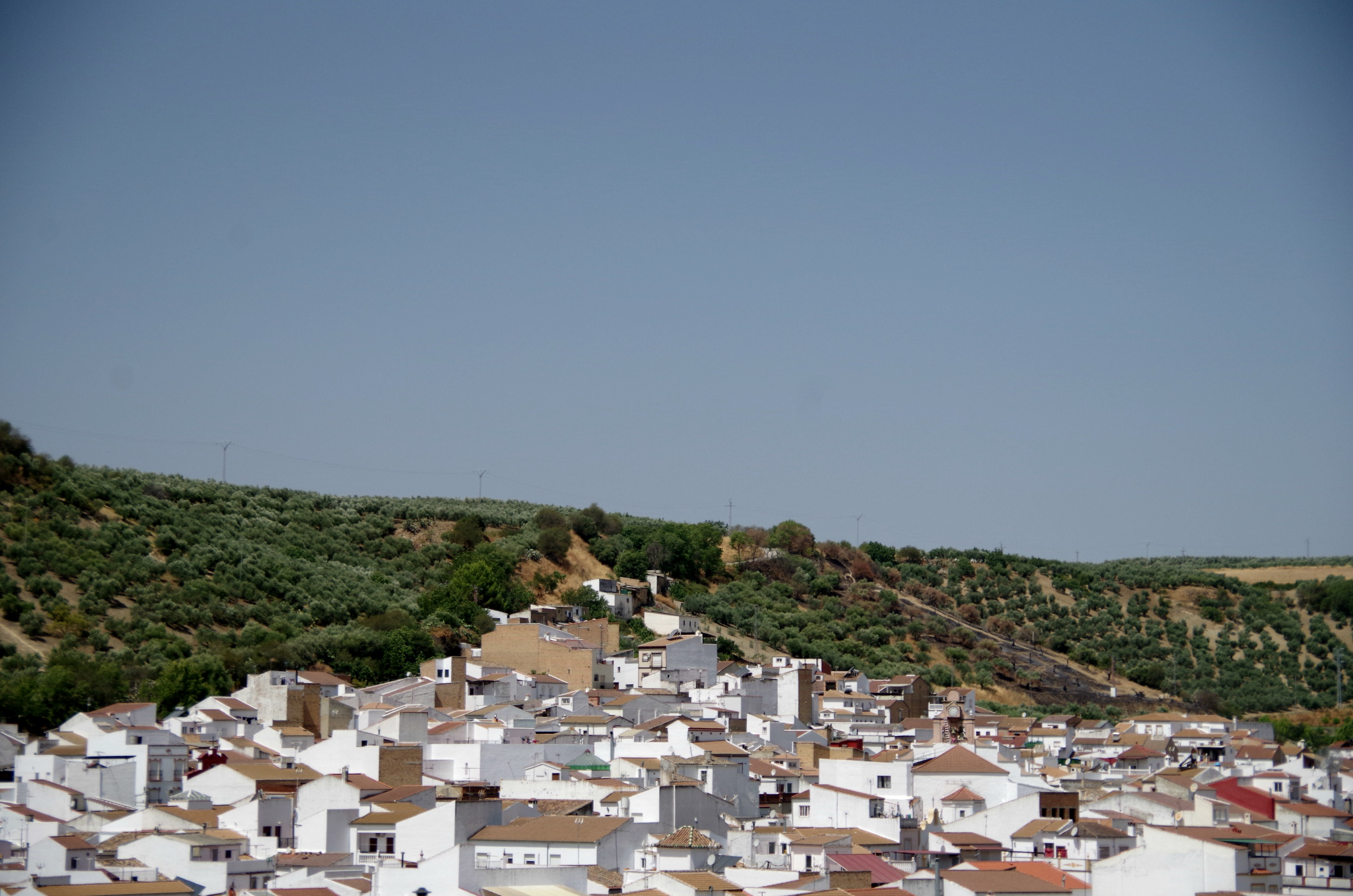
The magnifique view over the village

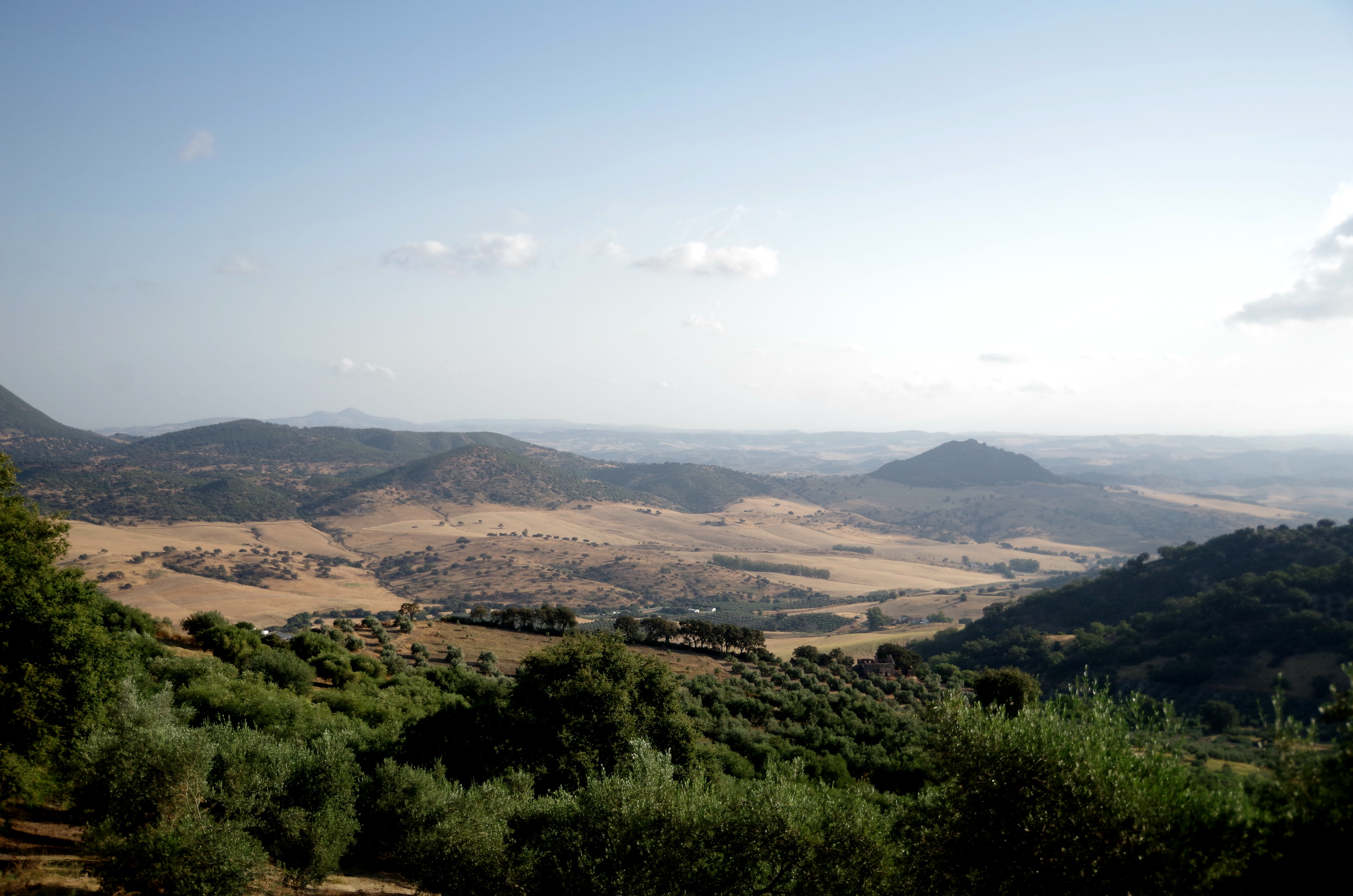

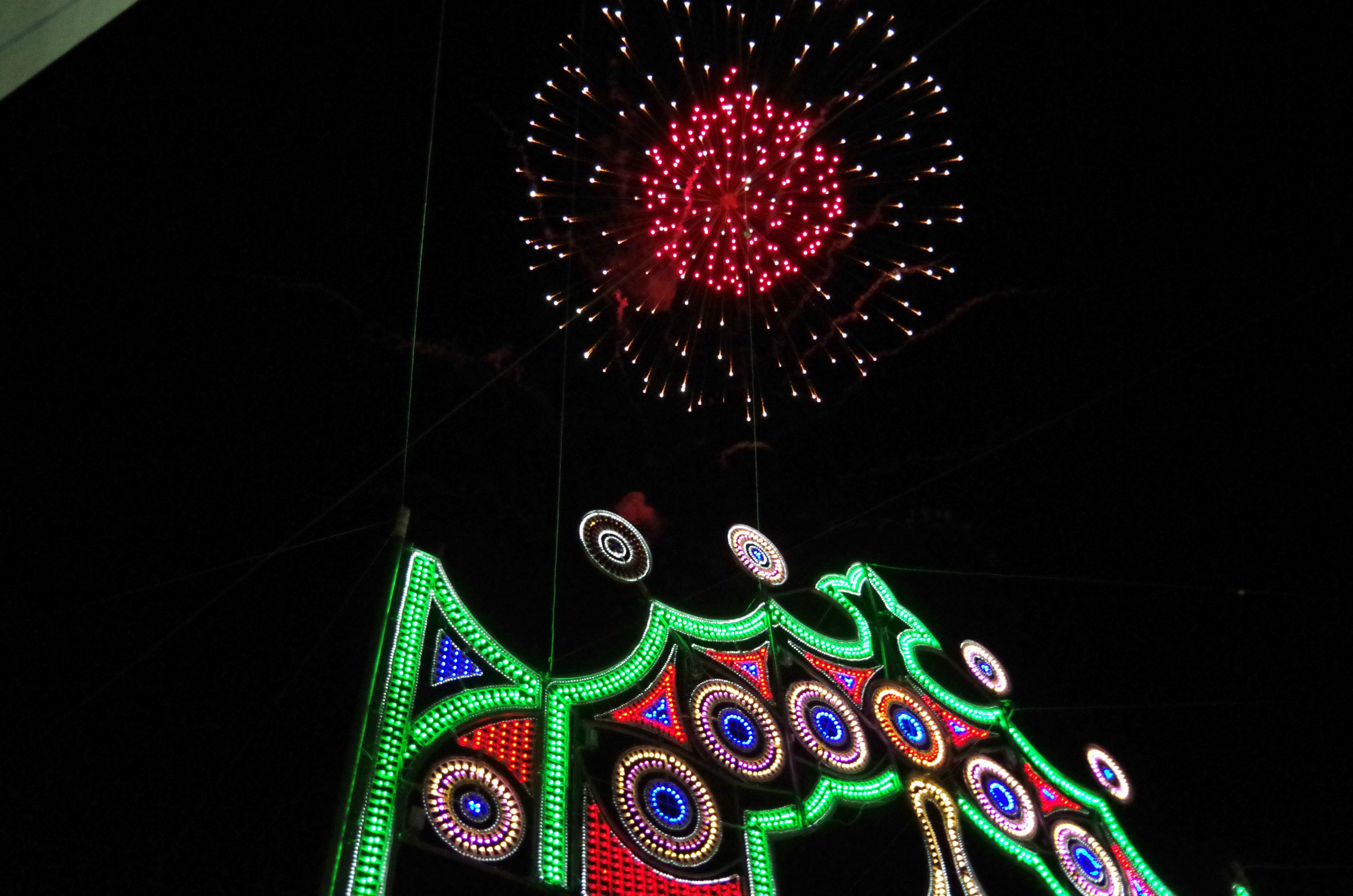
Feria y Fiestas de San Roque

The megalith deposit is located in the north of the Dehesa del Tomillo. It has been excavated in 1983 by the Museo Provincial de Cádiz and is confirmed to have served burials during the catholic period before 2000 a. C. The dolmenic group indicates an early population in this part of the sierra gaditana. It consists of a group of three dolmens arranged in a circle with a monolithic entrance and can be related to other similar groups in the regions of Sevilla and Malaga.

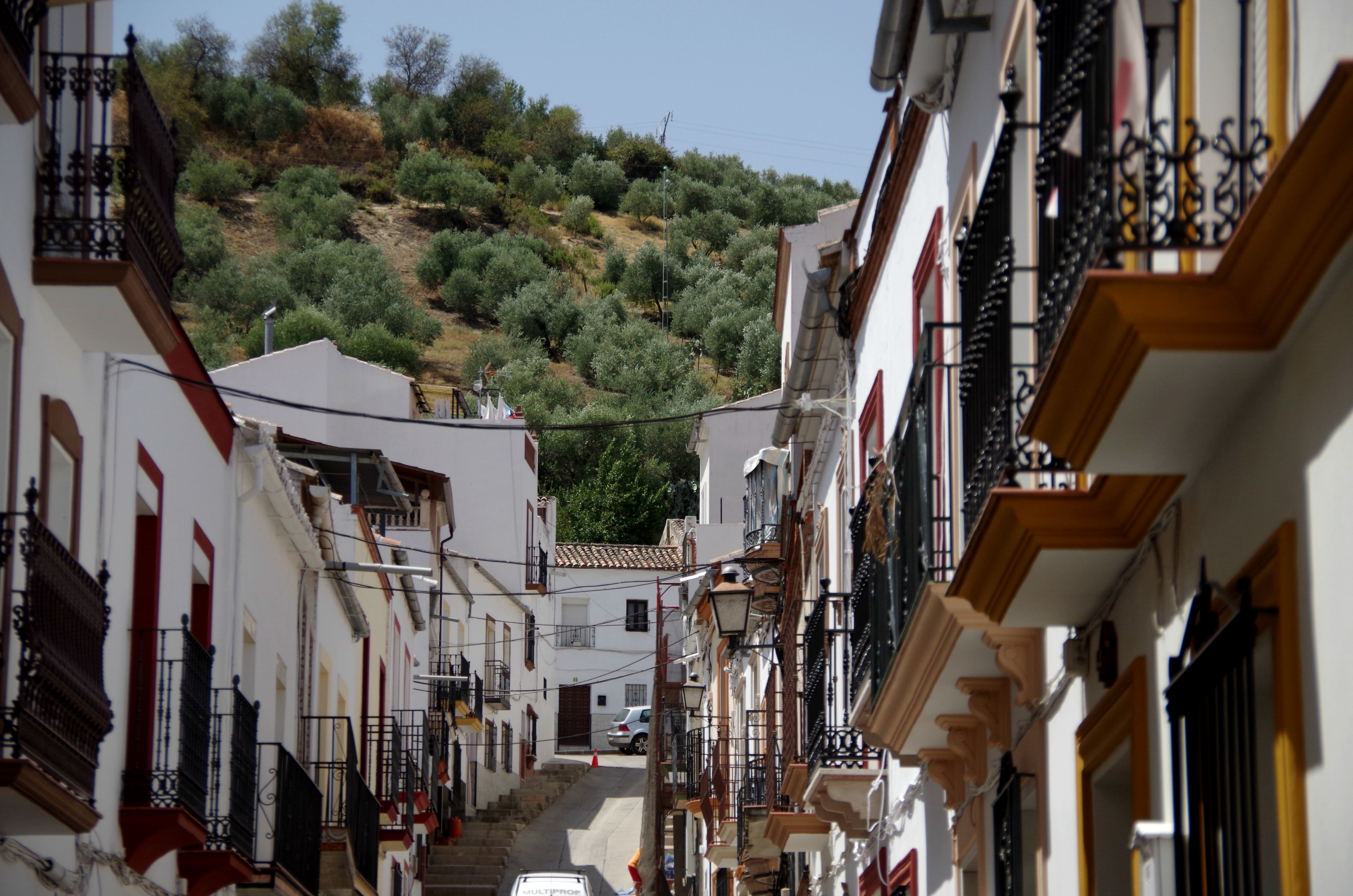

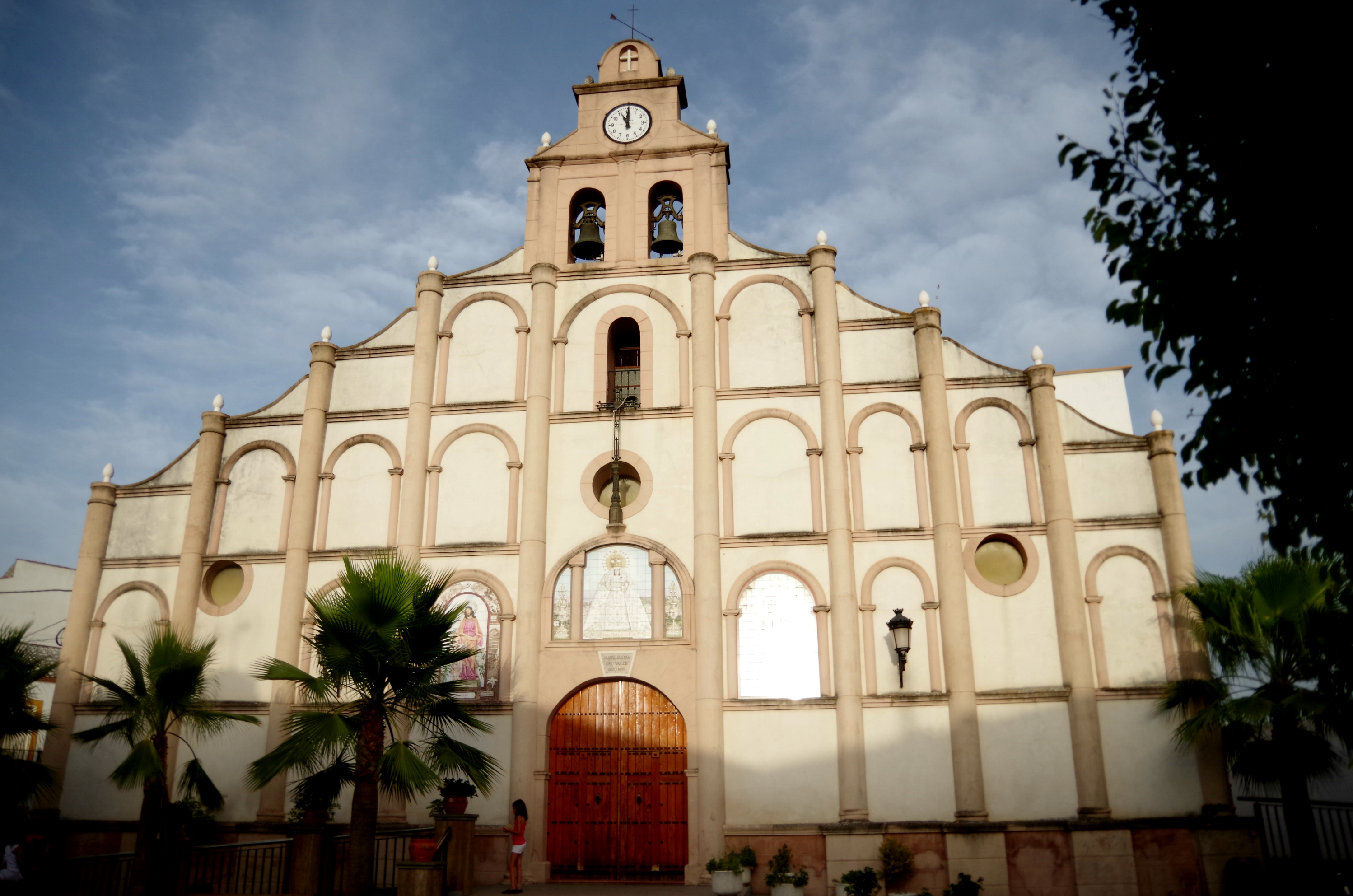
This is the Iglesia de Santa María del Valle in Alcalá del Valle

The most outstanding object in this deposit is a menhir, a huge rock of sharp end placed vertically on a small tumulus of stones. This menhir is the only example of this type in the province of Cádiz.

- Cortijo de La Cacería

At the municipal border, a little separated from the village, the Cortijo de La Cacería arises majestically. Its ancient appearance of a palace or a retreat can be explained by its former existence as residence of the marquis of Benamejí. The construction dates back to the XVI century. High walls are an example of precious stonework with volcanic rocks and stout masonry. The main courtyard is dominated by an impressive arcade. Above its pillars a second unit of arcs and double stairs is rising up. Today the Cortijo is mainly used to provide accommodation for mountain hunters.

- Fuente Grande (Great Fountain)

This spring is known from the beginning of the Moorish settlement. Nowadays it is embellished and completely restored. Water from this source is natural and it flows through five pipes.
In the area of the Fuente Grande, there have been found the archaeological remains of the Roman era, demonstrating the existence of population in antiquity. Excavations are being carried out to determine the type of site, which appears to be a villa with annexes agricultural production and ceramics.

- Monasterio de Caños Santos:

Caños Santos is a Convent-Monastery dating back to 16th century. It is situated only 6 kilometres from Alcalá and it offers views of the landscape.
The origins of the monastery of Caňos Santos are connected to the Celtic village of Caricus, which was reduced to a Visigoth hamlet. After the Islamic invasion its inhabitants hid an image of the virgin in the nearby mountains which was discovered in 1512 in the rocky cavity of a spring. A small chapel consecrated to Our Lady of Caňos Santos was built soon after and in the middle of the 16th century a monumental complex was built and it was inhabited by Franciscan friars due to the great devotion of the parishioners. Therefore, in its architecture there is a mixture of the original building and the renovations from the 17th and 18th centuries.
This convent building, under restoration with state and European funds, consists of a church of Baroque and mannerism style, and a cloister around which there are other buildings. The church tower stands out, erected on one side of the facade, as the best-preserved element. The stoned carved baptismal font that came from the old sanctuary and the polychrome high relief that depicts the discovery of the virgin in this place are also worthy of mention.
Declared a Bien de Interes Cultural (BIC), with the category of Monumental in 2001, the monumental building of Caňos Santos is located on a natural balcony with a grove of chestnut, elms and olive trees, and in its surroundings there is the cave where, according to the popular belief, the virgin who gives the name to the convent appeared in the springs.

== Celebrations ==
- Semana Santa
- Romería de la Virgen del Valle
- Romería de San Isidro Labrador
- Feria y Fiestas de San Roque
- Procesión de la Virgen del Valle
- Carnavales

== Economy ==
- Olive
- Esparto
- Animal husbandry
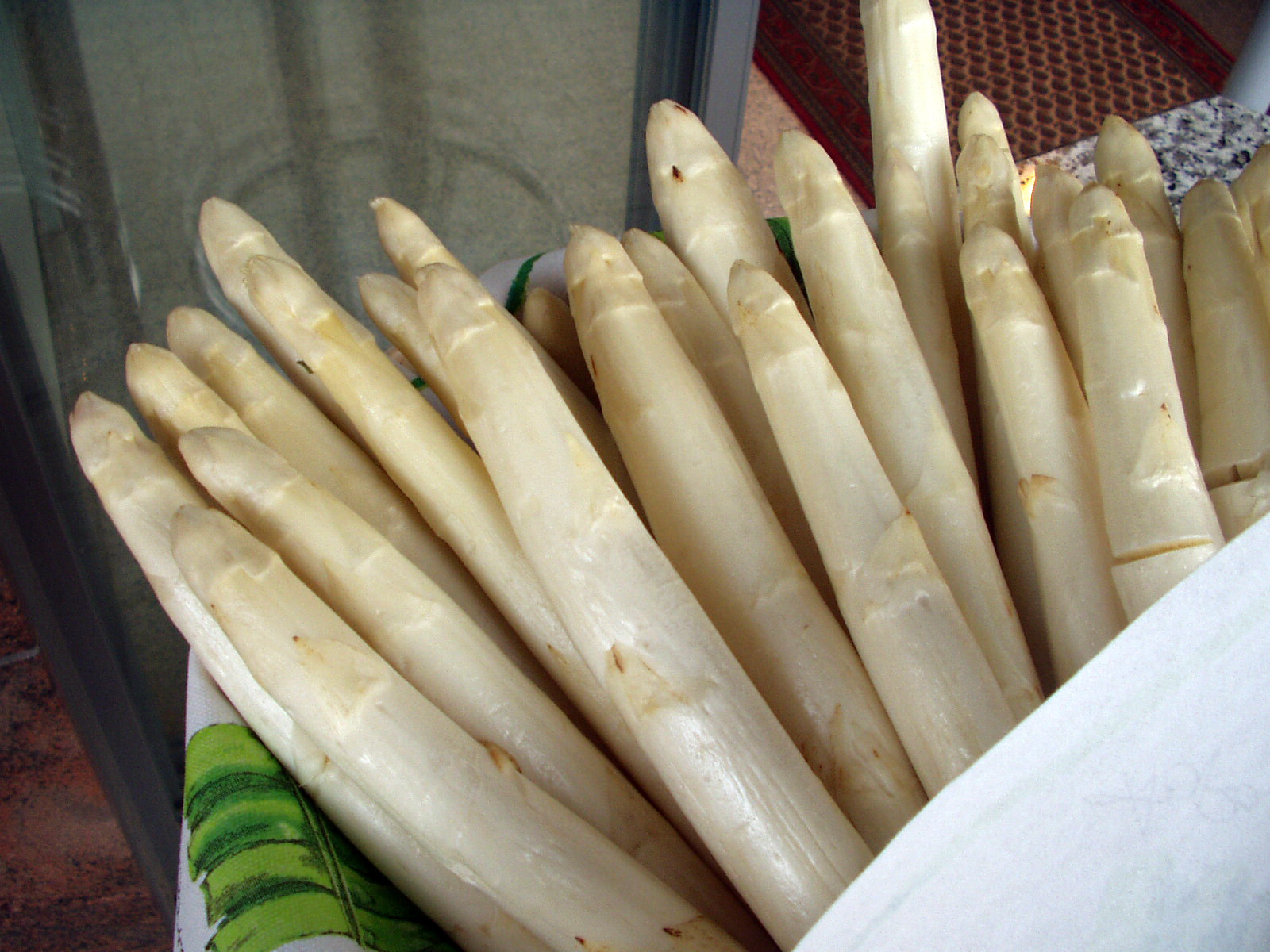
Asparagus are the main money income of Alcalá del Valle

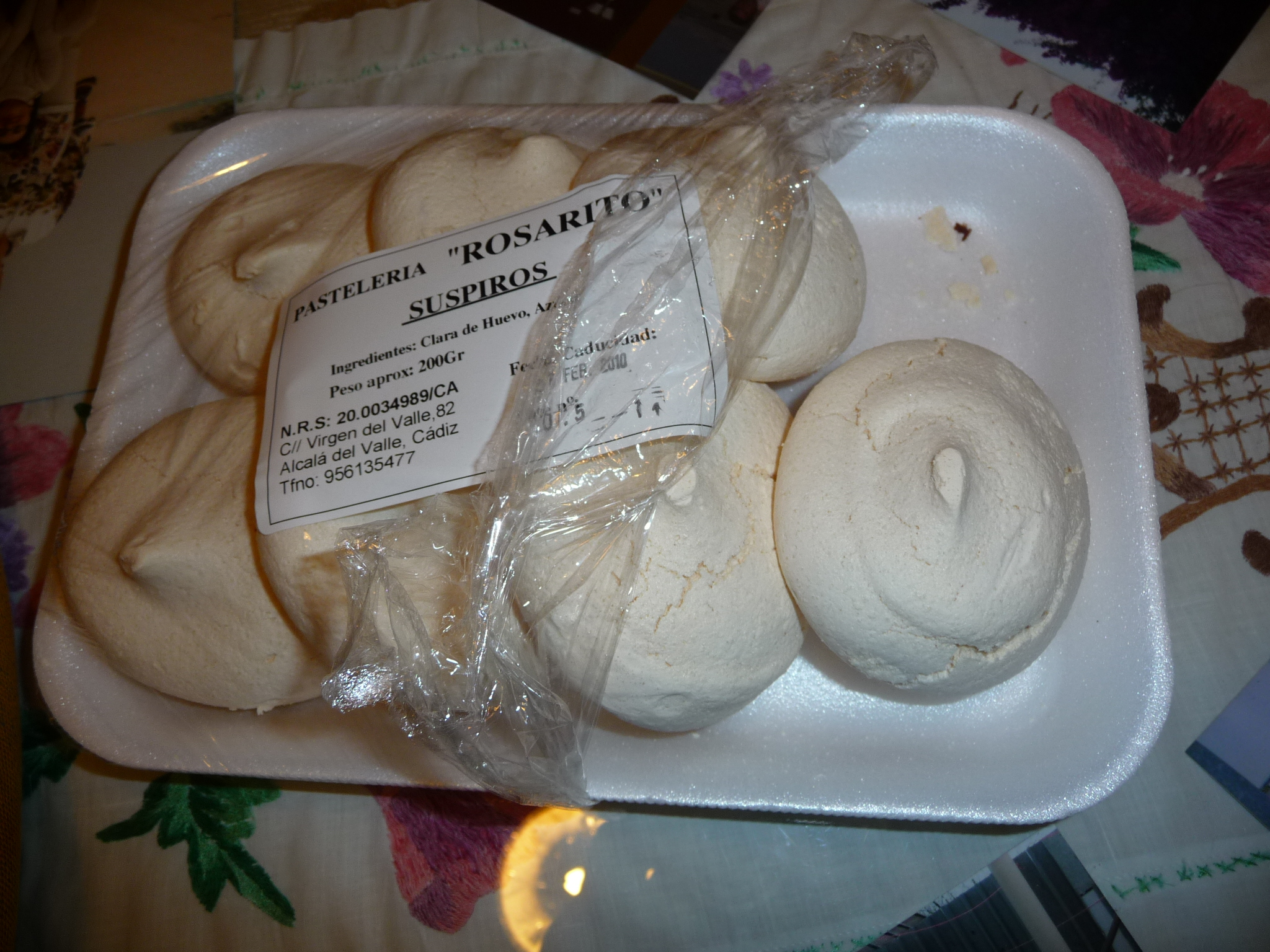
Suspiros, typical pastry

== Flora and fauna ==
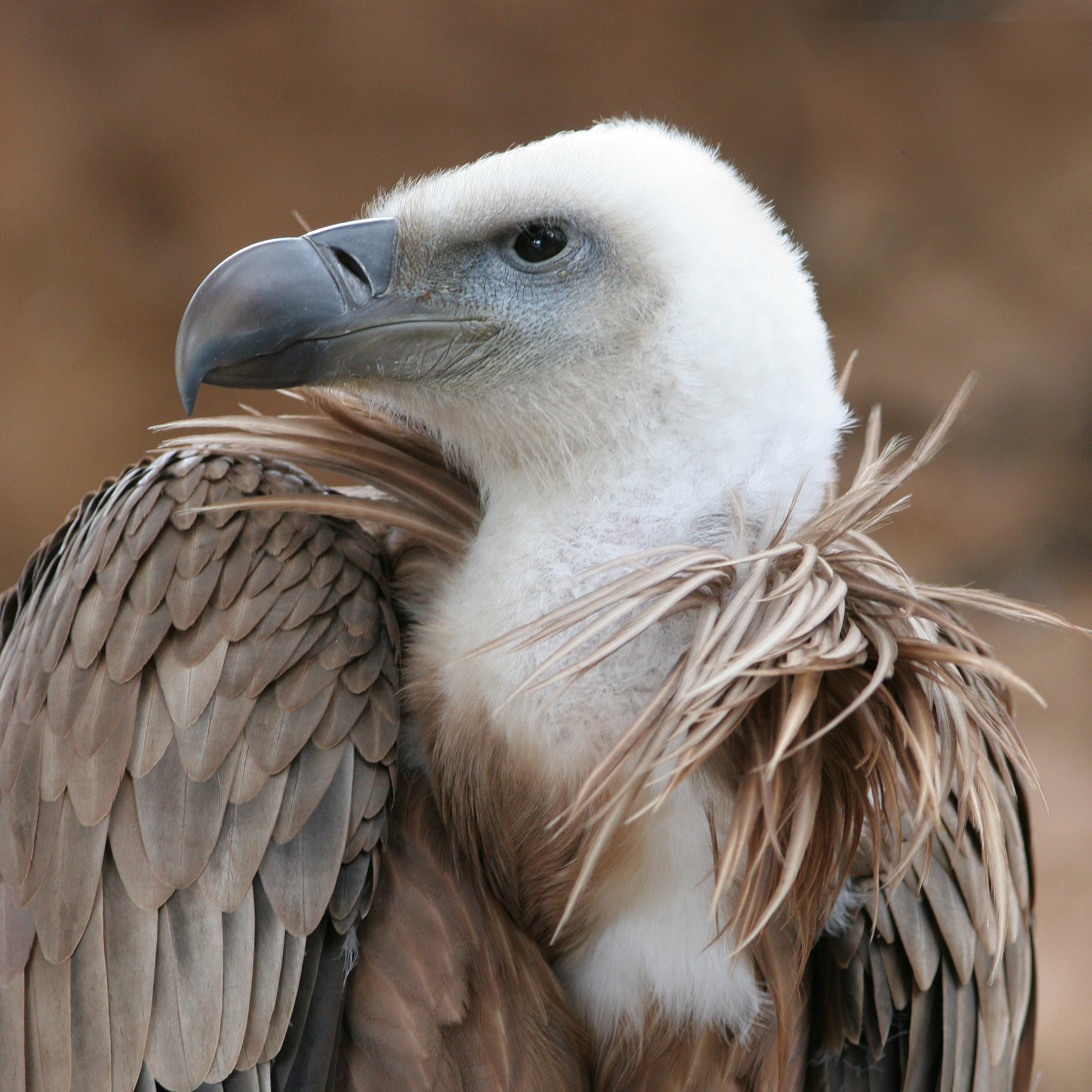
Griffon vultures are very common in Alcalá del Valle

=== Flora ===
- Oak
- Portuguese oak
- Cistaceae
- Spanish broom
- Asparagus
- Daphne

=== Fauna ===
- Common swift
- Great tit
- Blue tit
- Bonelli's eagle
- Griffon vulture

== Demographics ==
Historical population
Year	Pop.	±%
1999	5,274	—
2000	5,271	−0.1%
2001	5,292	+0.4%
2002	5,278	−0.3%
2003	5,329	+1.0%
2004	5,325	−0.1%
2005	5,355	+0.6%
Source: INE (Spain)

== See also ==
- List of municipalities in Cádiz
