= Castle of Torre-Alháquime =

- Castillo de Torre-Alháquime (Spanish)
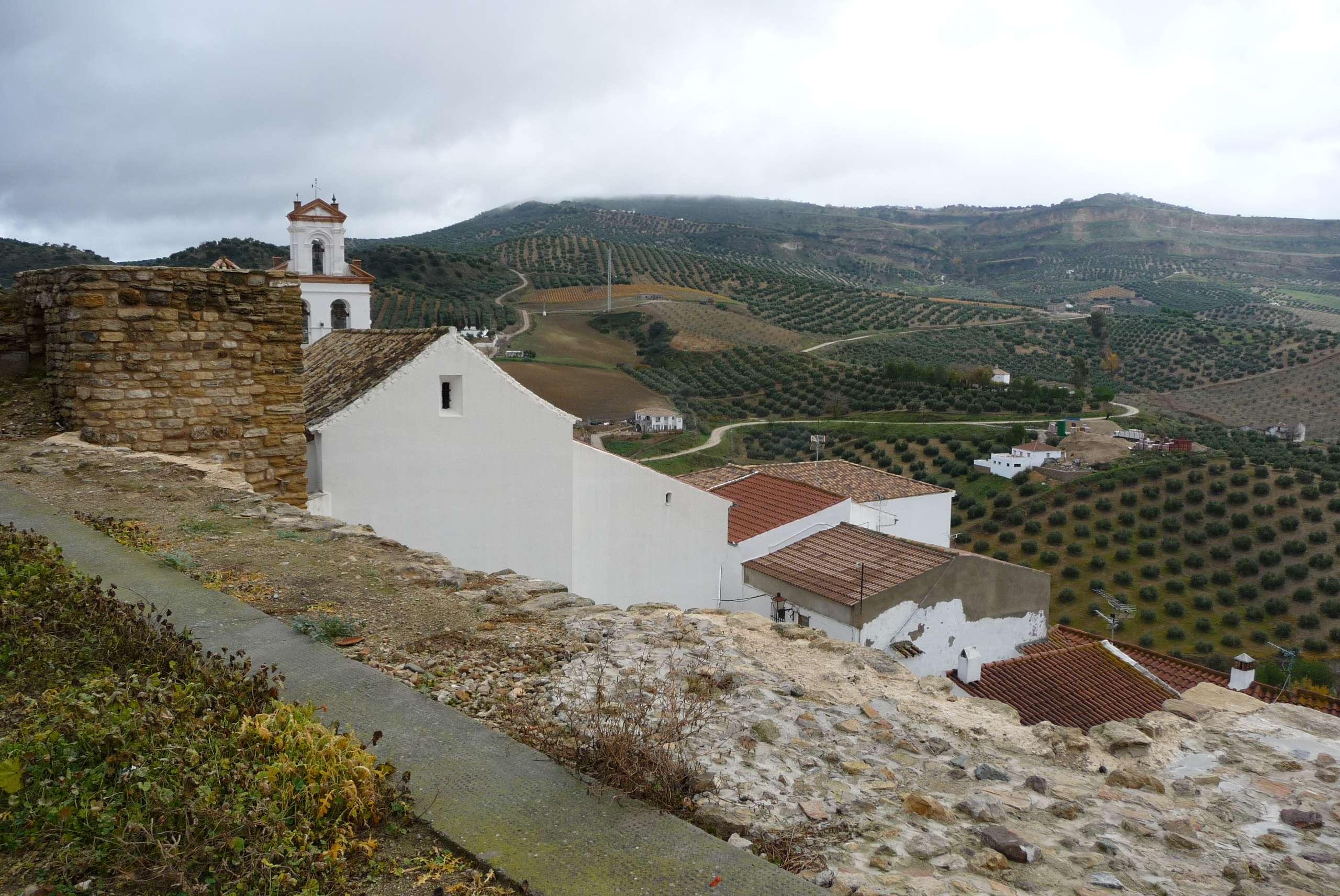

- Location within Spain
- 36.915735°N 5.235234°W
- Location: Torre Alhaquime, Spain

Spanish Cultural Heritage
- Official name: Castillo de Torre-Alháquime
- Type: Non-movable
- Criteria: Monument
- Designated: 1993
- Reference no.: RI-51-0007639

The Castle of Torre-Alháquime (Spanish: Castillo de Torre-Alháquime) is a castle located in Torre Alhaquime, Spain. It was declared Bien de Interés Cultural in 1993.
