= Algodonales =

- Municipality
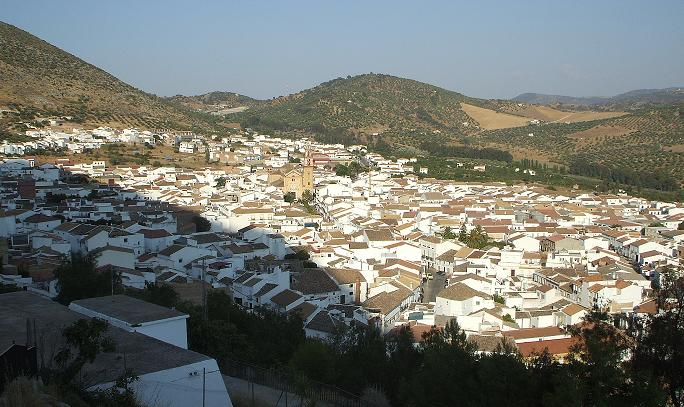

- Flag Coat of arms

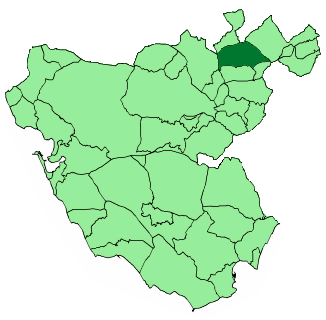

- Location in Spain
- Coordinates: 36°52′52″N 5°24′20″W
- Country: Spain
- Autonomous community: Andalusia
- Province: Cádiz
- Comarca: Sierra de Cádiz

Government
  - Alcalde: Antonio Acuña Racero (2012) (PSOE)

Area
  - Total: 134.16 km^{2} (51.80 sq mi)
- Elevation: 370 m (1,210 ft)

Population (2025-01-01)
  - Total: 5,425
  - Density: 40.44/km^{2} (104.7/sq mi)
- Demonyms: Algodonaleño, ña
- Time zone: UTC+1 (CET)
  - Summer (DST): UTC+2 (CEST)
- Postal code: 11680
- Website: algodonales.es

Algodonales is a city and a Municipality, located in the province of Cádiz, Spain. According to the 2002 census, the city has a population of 5,607 inhabitants. The nearest cities are Zahara de la Sierra and Olvera. Algodonales is located in the Sierra de Lijar within the Sierra de Grazalema.

== Demographics ==
From:INE Archiv

== Economy ==
- Agriculture
- Rural tourism
- Adventure travel
- guitar manufacturers

== Monuments ==
- Ermita de la Concepción. (hermitage)
- Ermita de la Virgencita. (hermitage)
- Iglesia Parroquial de Santa Ana. (church)

== See also ==
- List of municipalities in Cádiz
