= Sierra de Cádiz =

Coordinates: 36°52′N 5°38′W

- Comarca
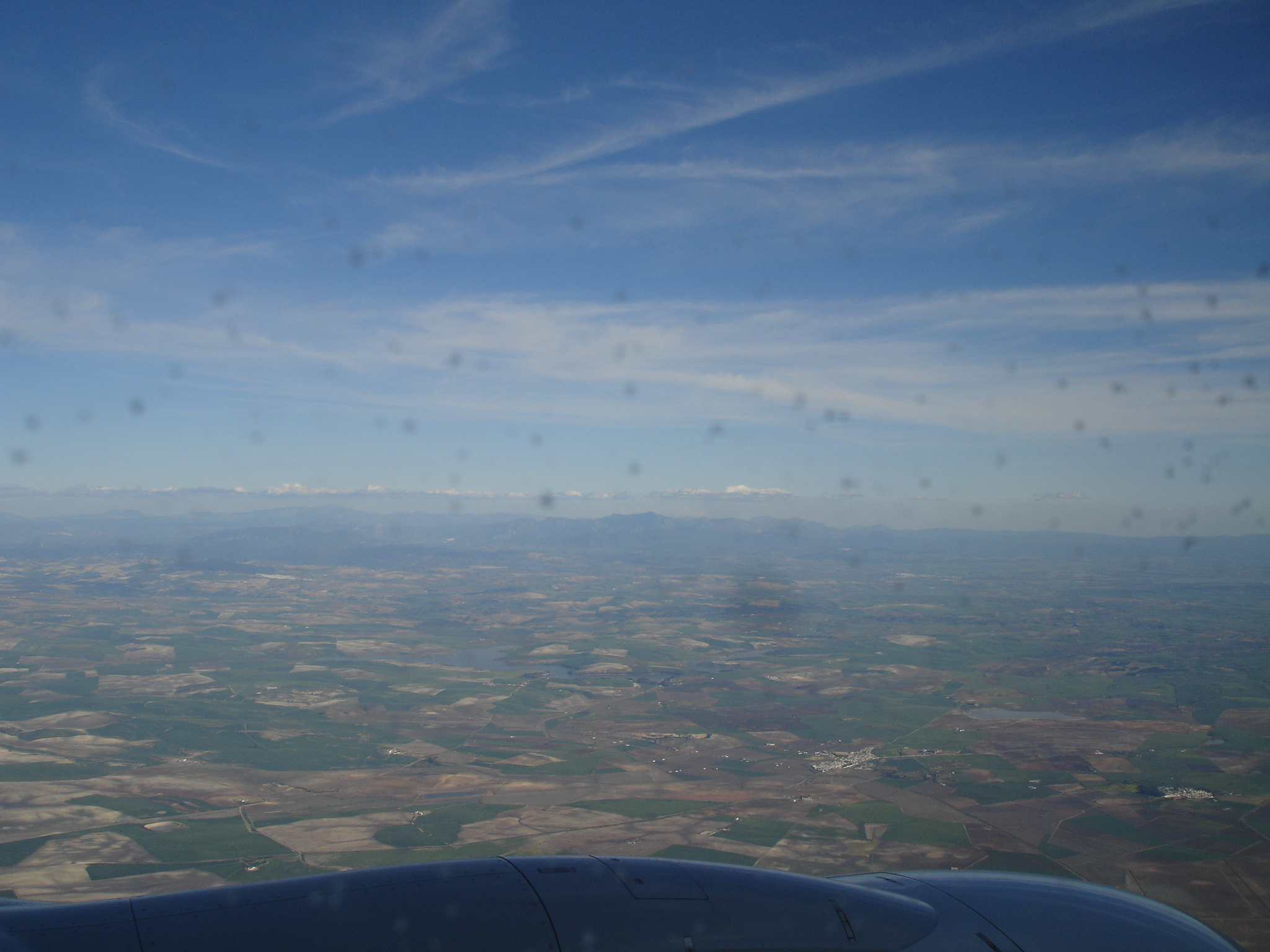
- Sierra de Cádiz while landing in Jerez airport.

- Location of Sierra de Cádiz in Andalusia, Spain

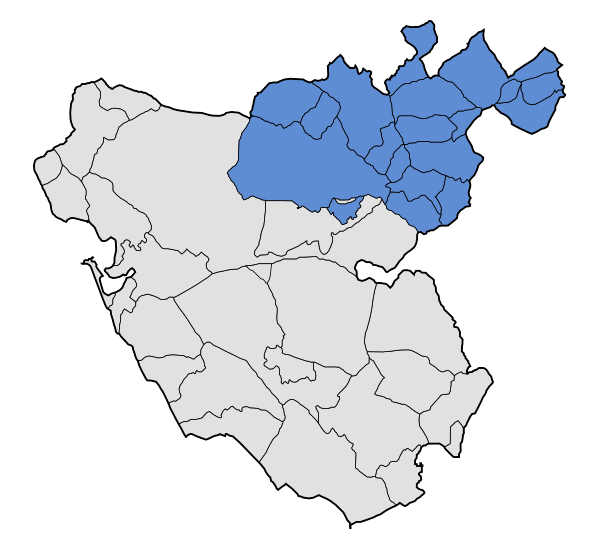
- Location of Sierra de Cádiz in the province of Cádiz
- Country: Spain
- Autonomous community: Andalusia
- Province: Cádiz
- Capital: Villamartín
- Municipalities: List: Alcalá del Valle, Algar, Algodonales, Arcos de la Frontera, Benaocaz, Bornos, El Bosque, Espera, El Gastor, Grazalema, Olvera, Puerto Serrano, Setenil de las Bodegas, Torre Alháquime, Ubrique, Villaluenga del Rosario, Villamartín, Zahara de la Sierra

Area
  - Total: 1,997 km^{2} (771 sq mi)

Population (2023) (Note: Estimate at 1 January 2023: National Statistics Institute (Spain))
  - Total: 115,145
  - Density: 57.66/km^{2} (149.3/sq mi)
- Demonym: serrano
- Time zone: UTC+1 (CET)
  - Summer (DST): UTC+2 (CEST)

Sierra de Cádiz (Spanish: "Cádiz Mountains") is one of the six comarcas (county, but with no administrative role) province of Cádiz (Andalusia, southern Spain).

Most of the comarca's territory falls within the Sierra de Grazalema Natural Park, a protected area. This comarca was established in 2003 by the Government of Andalusia.

== Municipalities ==
The Sierra de Cádiz comarca includes the following municipalities:

Arms	Municipality	Area (Km^{2})	Population (2023) (Note: Estimate at 1 January 2023: National Statistics Institute (Spain))	Density (/Km^{2})
	Alcalá del Valle	46.89	4,995	106.53
	Algar	26.60	1,444	54.29
	Algodonales	134.16	5,498	40.98
	Arcos de la Frontera	527.54	30,953	58.67
	Benaocaz	69.39	714	10.29
	Bornos	54.31	7,559	139.18
	El Bosque	30.75	2,224	72.33
	El Gastor	28	1,697	60.61
	Espera	123.44	3,802	30.80
	Grazalema	122.41	2,002	16.35
	Olvera	194	7,887	40.65
	Prado del Rey	49	5,634	114.98
	Puerto Serrano	80	6,929	86.61
	Setenil de las Bodegas	82	2,638	32.17
	Torre Alháquime	17.36	799	46.03
	Ubrique	71	16,363	230.46
	Villaluenga del Rosario	57	480	8.42
	Villamartín	211.42	12,165	57.54
	Zahara de la Sierra	72	1,362	18.92
	Total	1,997.27	115,145	57.65

== Gallery ==
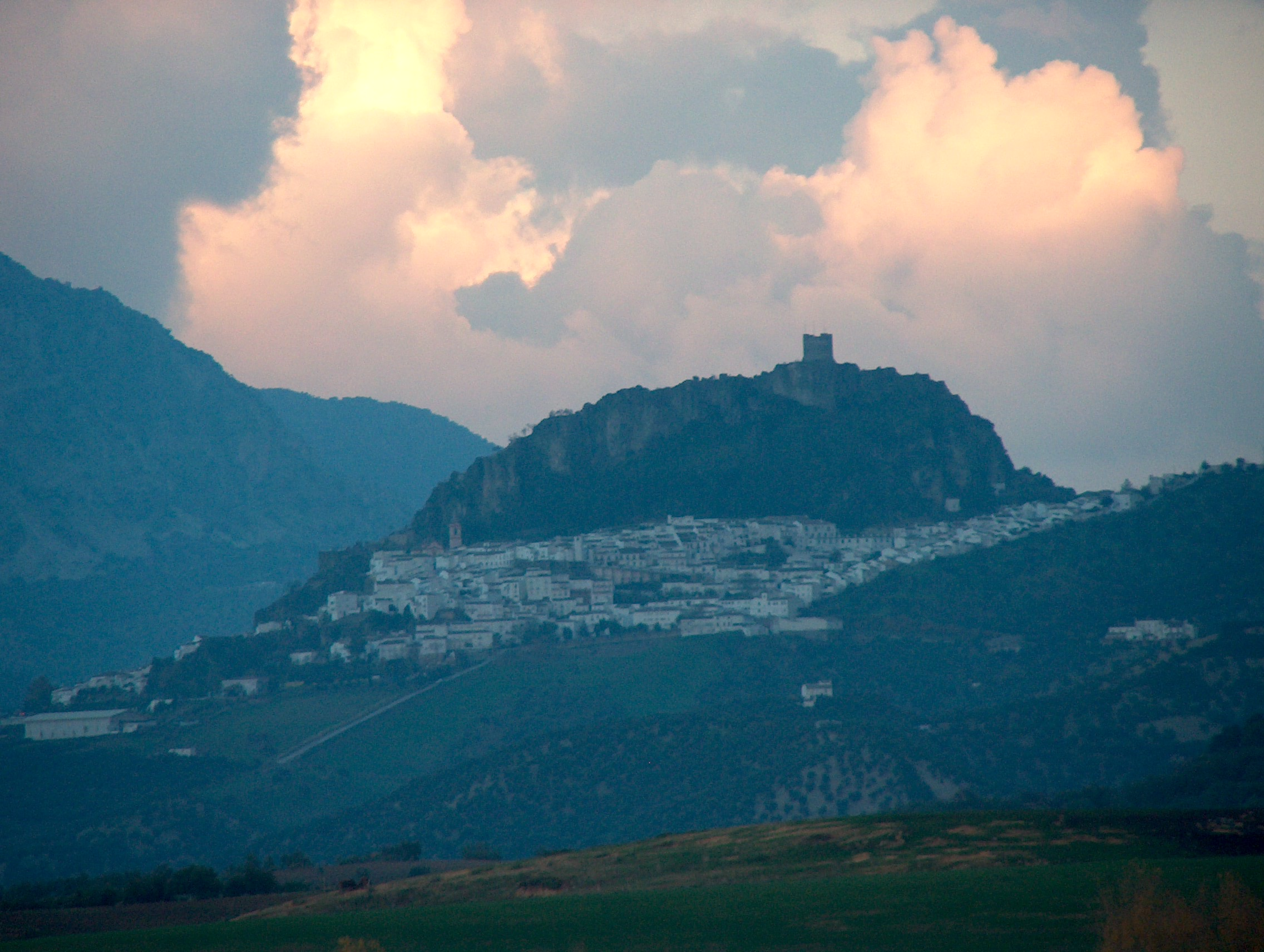
Zahara de la Sierra

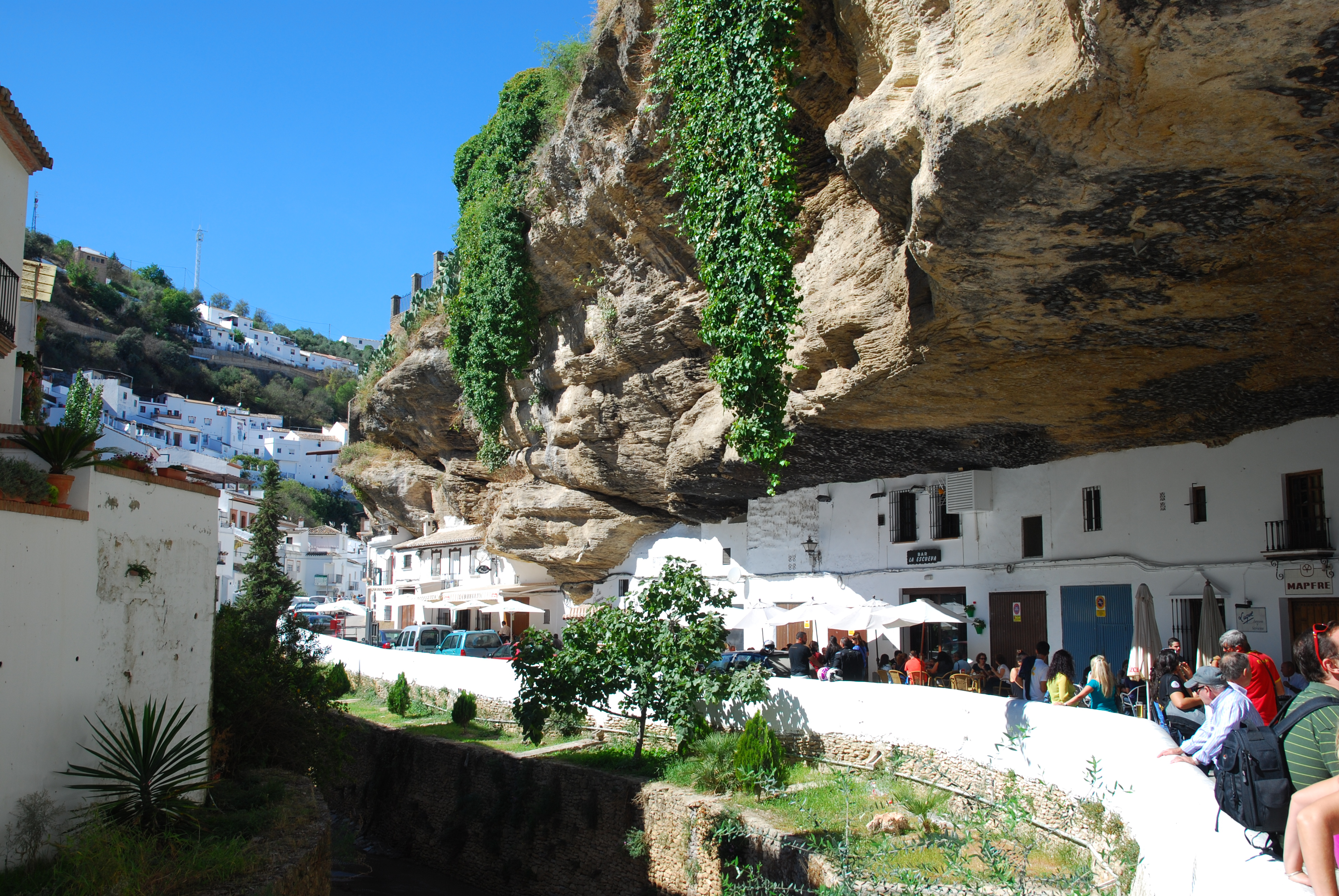
Setenil de las Bodegas

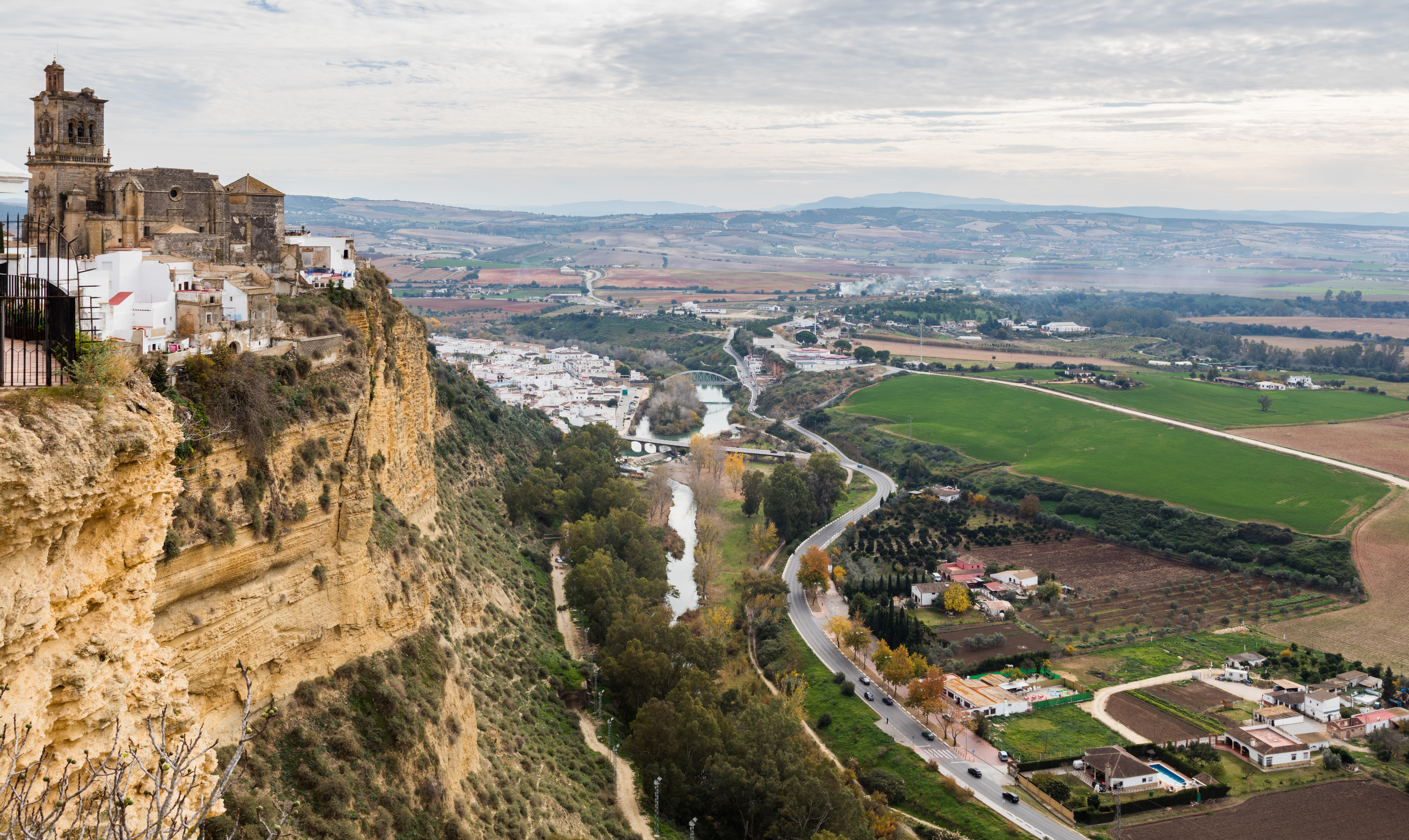
Arcos de la Frontera

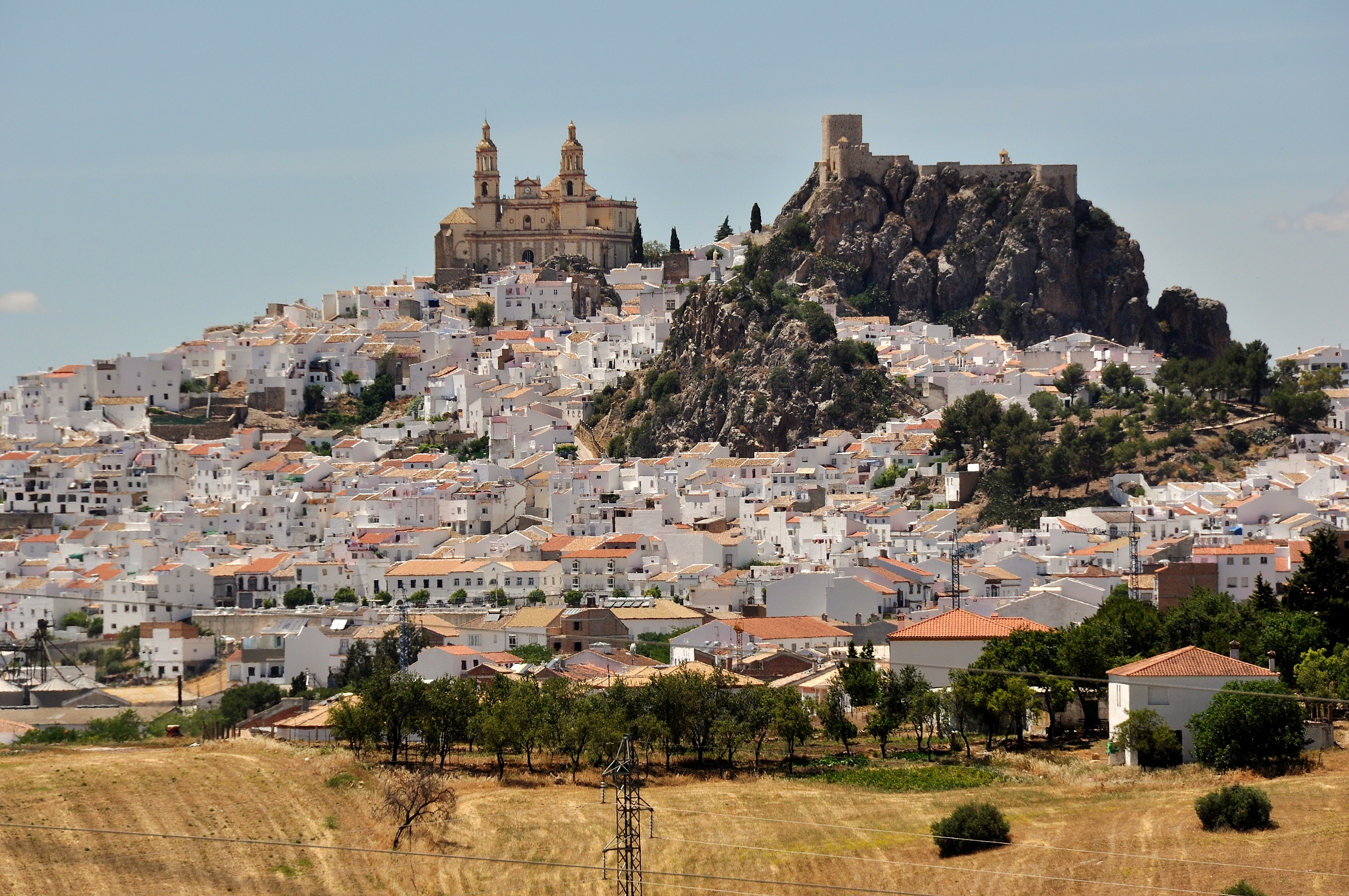
Olvera

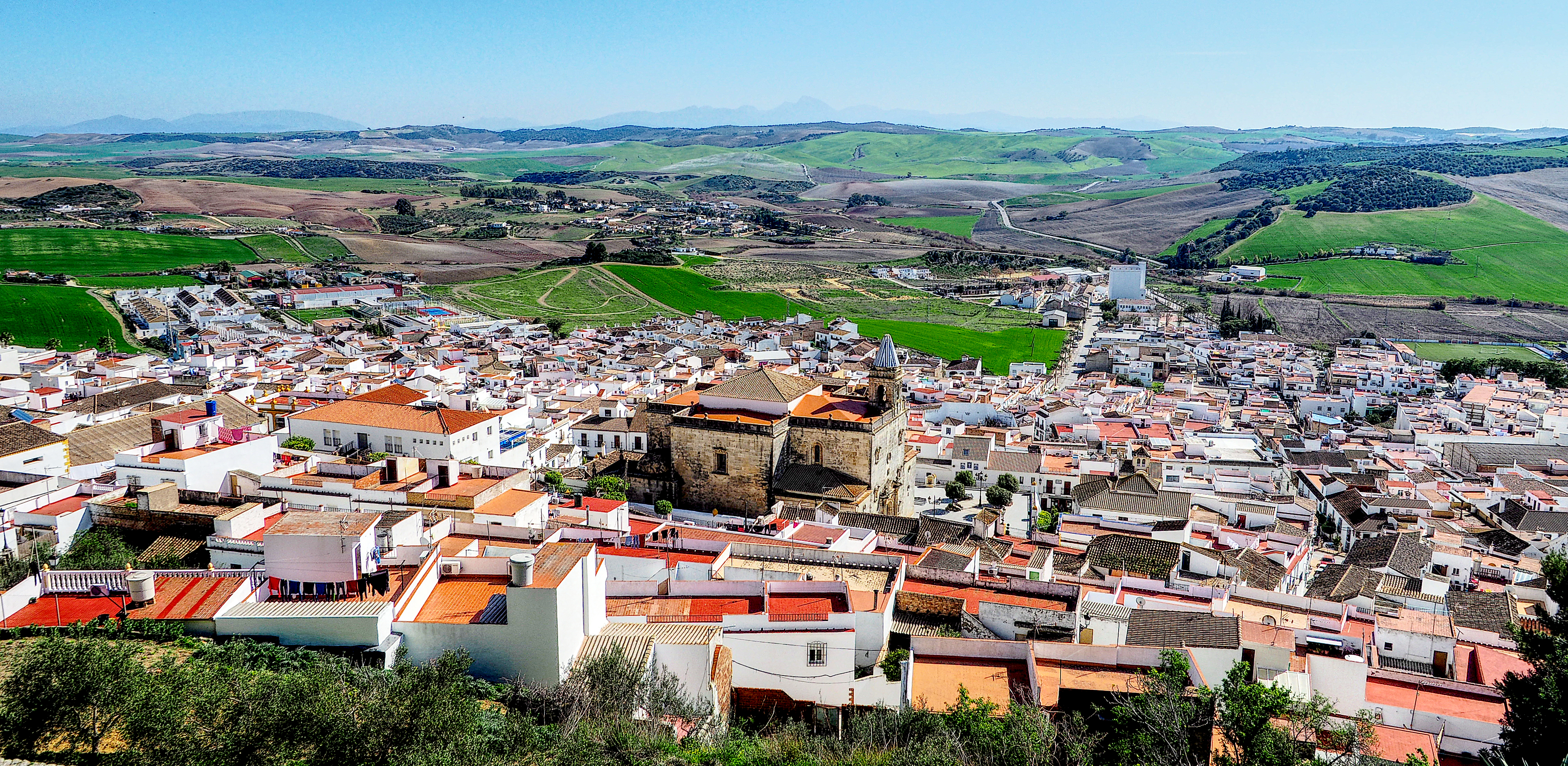
Espera

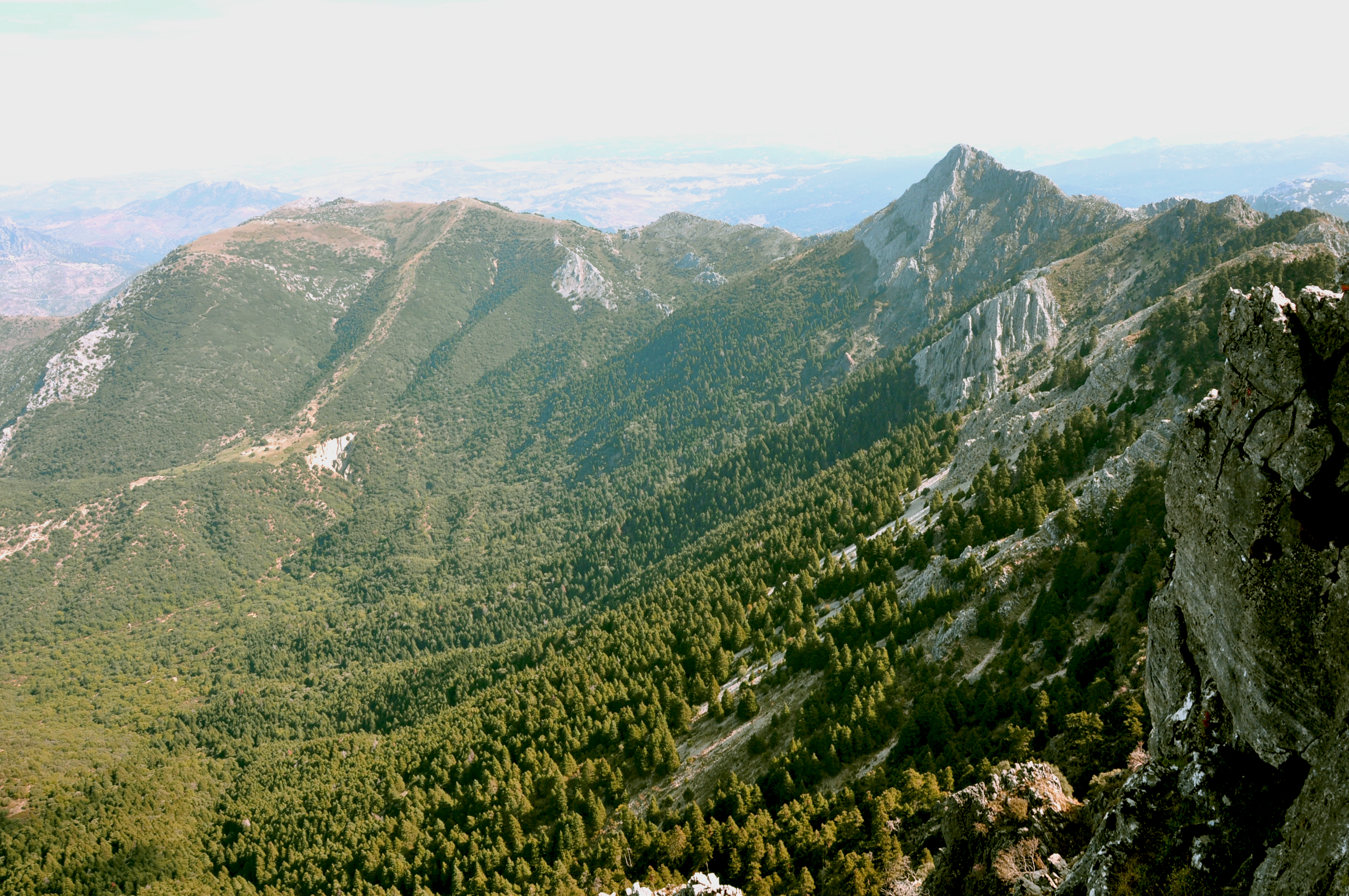
Sierra de Grazalema Natural Park
