= Bornos =

- Municipality
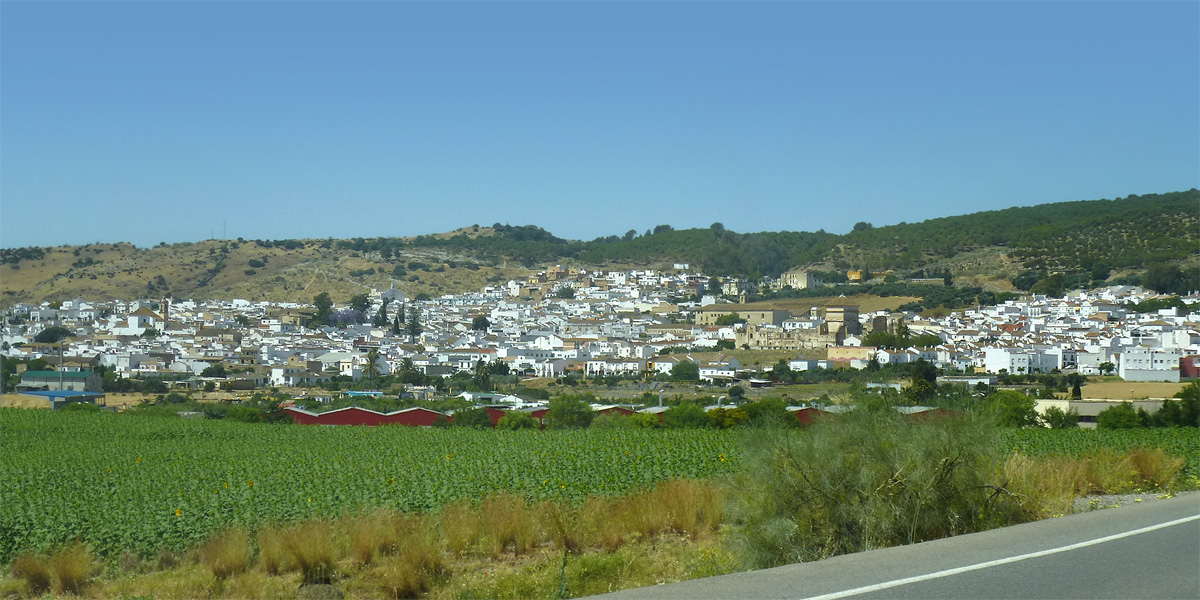

- Flag Coat of arms
- Nickname: Born
- Motto: Holiday City
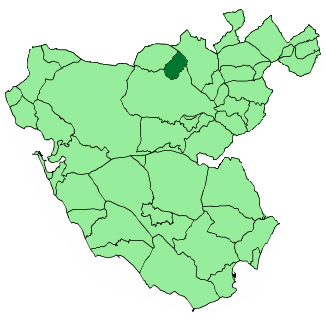
- Location of Bornos

- Location in Spain
- Coordinates: 36°49′N 5°44′W
- Country: Spain
- Autonomous community: Andalusia
- Province: Cádiz
- Comarca: Sierra de Cádiz

Government
  - Alcalde: Fernando García Navarro (2007) (PP)

Area
  - Total: 54.31 km^{2} (20.97 sq mi)
- Elevation: 182 m (597 ft)

Population (2025-01-01)
  - Total: 7,506
  - Density: 138.2/km^{2} (358.0/sq mi)
- Demonym(s): Bornicho; Bornense
- Time zone: UTC+1 (CET)
  - Summer (DST): UTC+2 (CEST)
- Postal code: 11640
- Website: bornos.es

Bornos is a town and municipality located in the province of Cádiz, Spain.

== Demographics ==
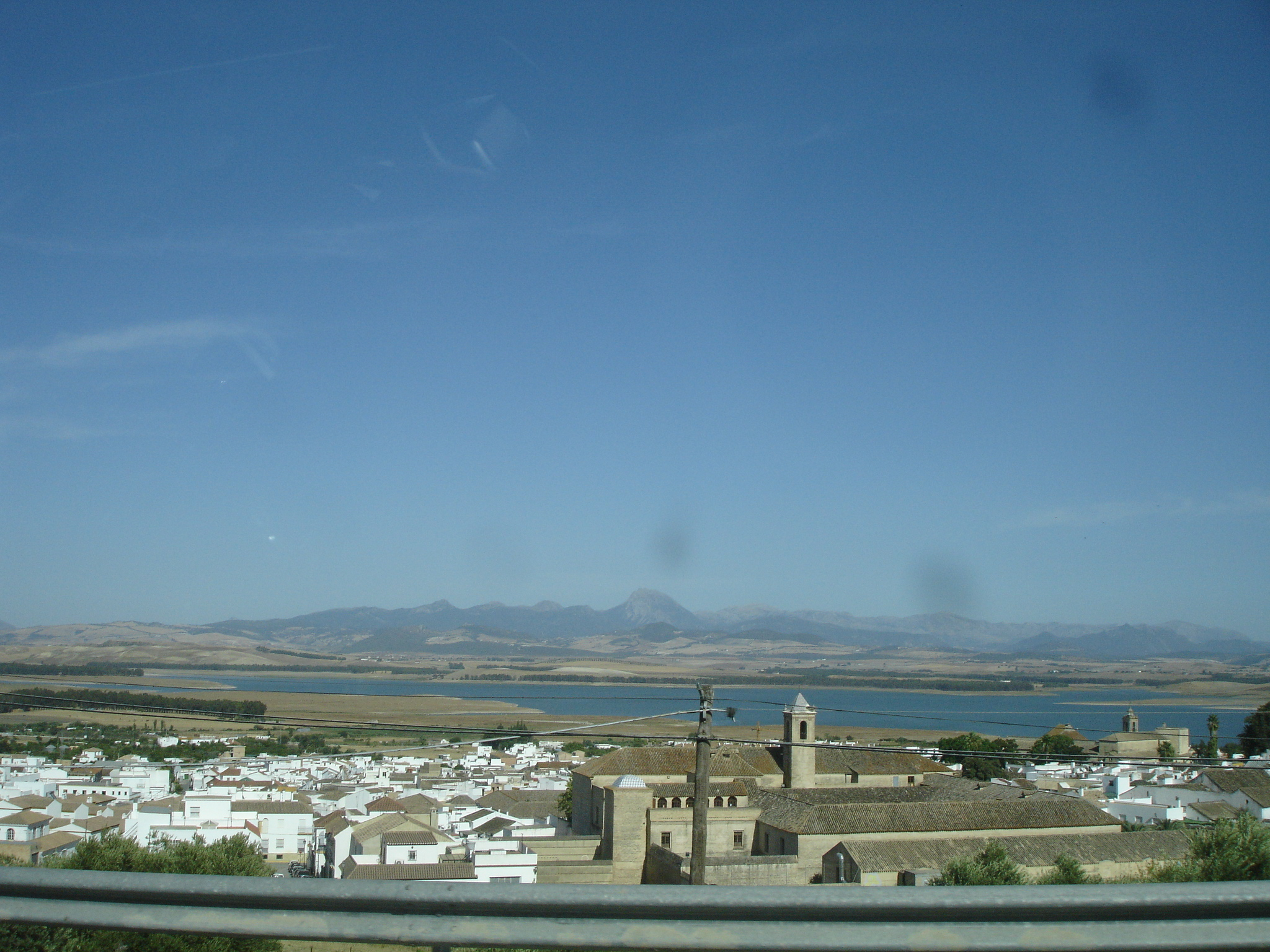
Bornos

Historical population
Year	Pop.	±%
1999	8,029	—
2000	7,897	−1.6%
2001	7,979	+1.0%
2002	7,987	+0.1%
2003	8,064	+1.0%
2004	8,082	+0.2%
2005	8,164	+1.0%
Source: INE (Spain)

== See also ==
- List of municipalities in Cádiz
