= El Gastor =

- Municipality
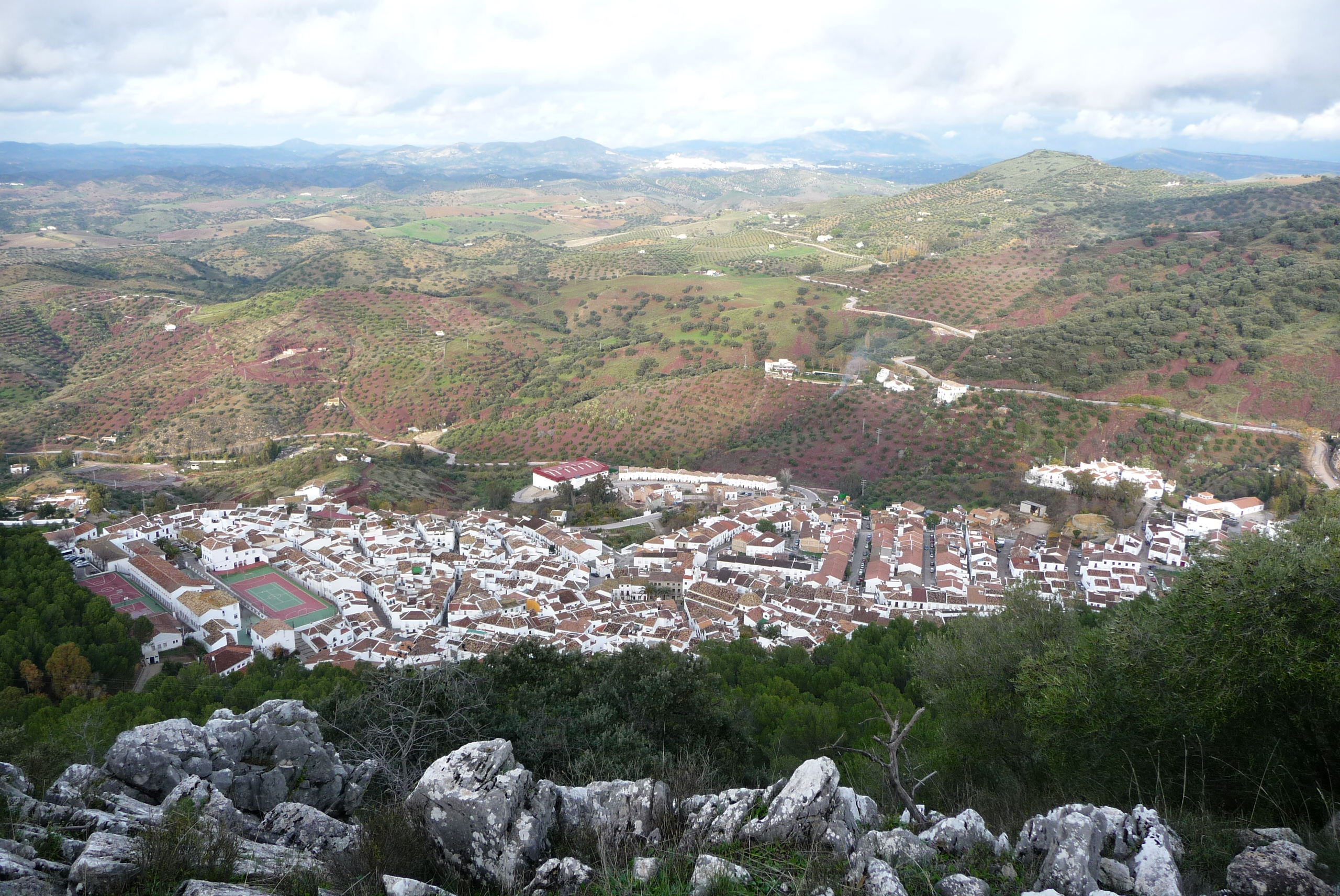
- El Gastor from Algarín mountain

- Coat of arms

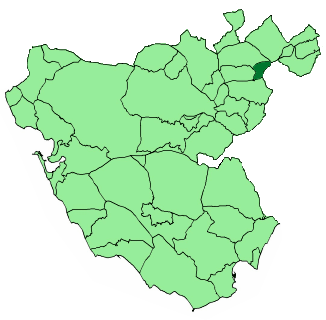
- Location of El Gastor

- Location in Spain
- Coordinates: 36°51′N 5°19′W
- Country: Spain
- Autonomous community: Andalusia
- Province: Cádiz
- Comarca: Sierra de Cádiz

Government
  - Alcalde: José Luis Menacho (PA)

Area
  - Total: 28 km^{2} (11 sq mi)
- Elevation: 520 m (1,710 ft)

Population (2025-01-01)
  - Total: 1,675
  - Density: 60/km^{2} (150/sq mi)
- Time zone: UTC+1 (CET)
  - Summer (DST): UTC+2 (CEST)
- Postal code: 11687
- Website: elgastor.es

El Gastor is a city located in the province of Cádiz, Spain. According to the 2005 census, the city has a population of 1,948 inhabitants.

== Demographics ==
Historical population
Year	Pop.	±%
1999	1,978	—
2000	1,953	−1.3%
2001	1,926	−1.4%
2002	1,948	+1.1%
2003	1,957	+0.5%
2004	1,948	−0.5%
2005	1,948	+0.0%
Source: INE (Spain)

== See also ==
- List of municipalities in Cádiz
