= Espera =

- Municipality
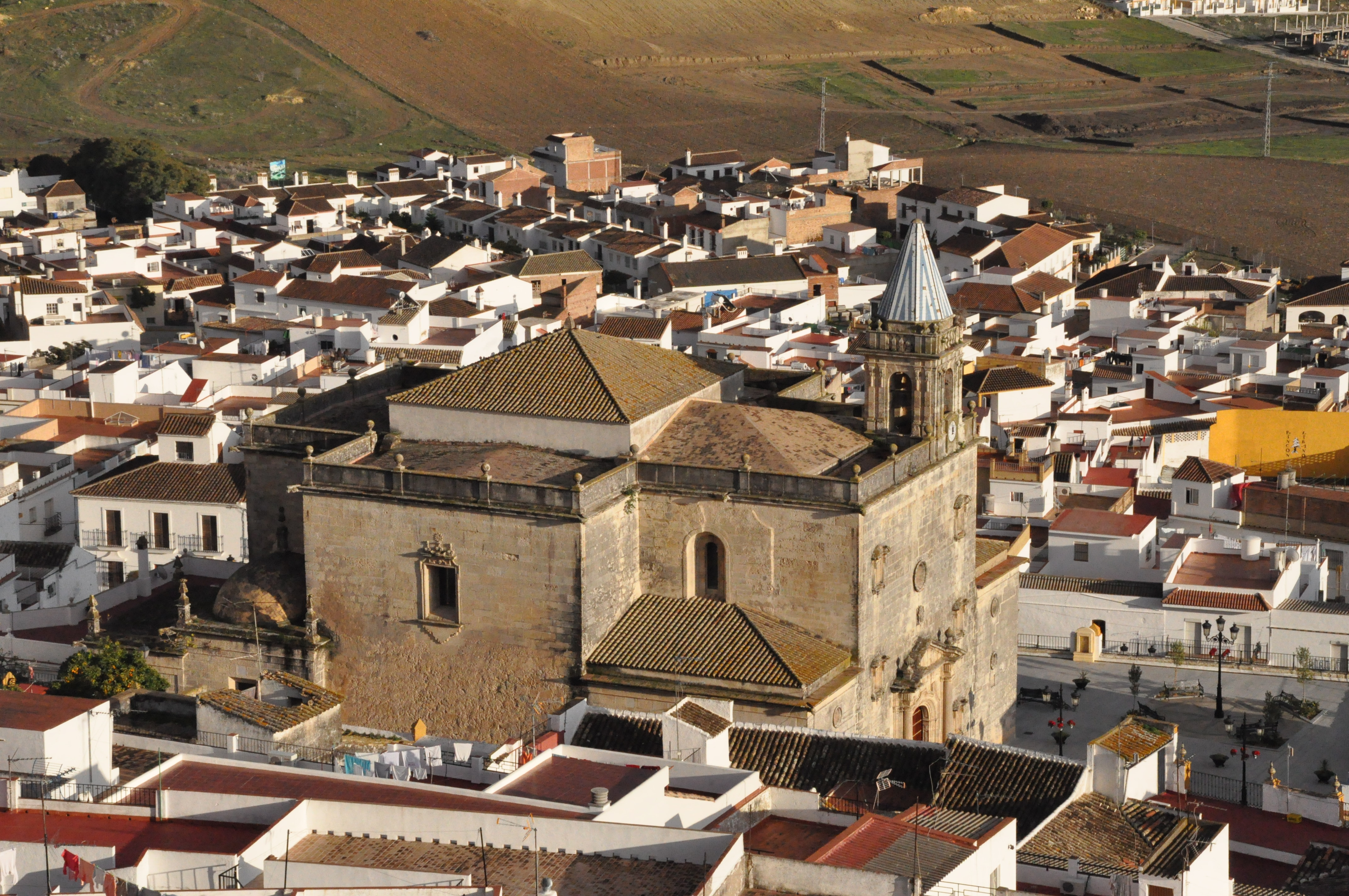
- Espera, December 2008

- Flag Coat of arms

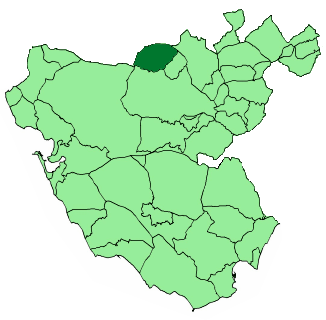
- Location of Espera

- Location in Spain
- Coordinates: 36°52′N 5°48′W
- Country: Spain
- Autonomous community: Andalusia
- Province: Cádiz
- Comarca: Sierra de Cádiz

Government
  - Mayor: Pedro Romero Valverde (Iziequeda Unida)

Area
  - Total: 123.44 km^{2} (47.66 sq mi)
- Elevation: 164 m (538 ft)

Population (2025-01-01)
  - Total: 3,755
  - Density: 30.42/km^{2} (78.79/sq mi)
- Demonym(s): Espereño, ña
- Time zone: UTC+1 (CET)
  - Summer (DST): UTC+2 (CEST)
- Postal code: 11648
- Website: espera.es

Espera is a city located in the province of Cádiz, Spain. According to the 2005 census, the city has a population of 3,909 inhabitants.

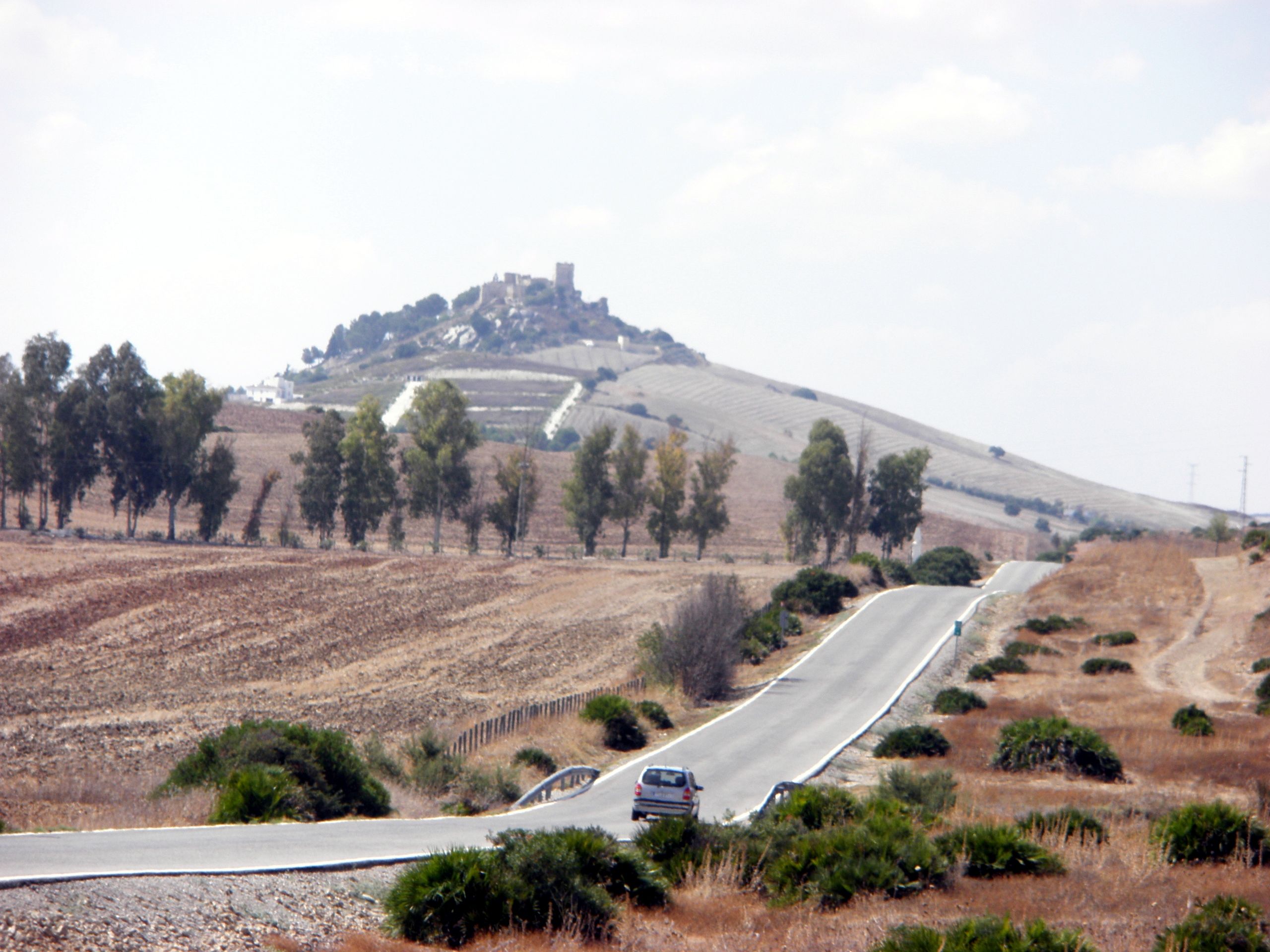
Espera castle.

== Demographics ==
Historical population
| Year | Pop. | ±% |
|---|---|---|
| 1999 | 3,975 | — |
| 2000 | 3,971 | −0.1% |
| 2001 | 3,934 | −0.9% |
| 2002 | 3,945 | +0.3% |
| 2003 | 3,885 | −1.5% |
| 2004 | 3,846 | −1.0% |
| 2005 | 3,909 | +1.6% |
Source: INE (Spain)

== See also ==
- List of municipalities in Cádiz
