= Algar, Andalusia =

Algar
- Municipality
- Flag Coat of arms

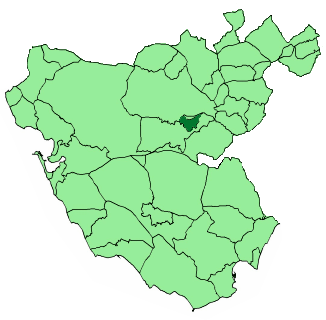

- Location in Spain
- Coordinates: 36°39′N 5°39′W
- Country: Spain
- Autonomous community: Andalusia
- Province: Cádiz
- Comarca: Sierra de Cádiz

Government
  - Alcalde: Jose M. Lozano Venegas (PA)

Area
  - Total: 26.60 km^{2} (10.27 sq mi)
- Elevation: 212 m (696 ft)

Population (2025-01-01)
  - Total: 1,452
  - Density: 54.59/km^{2} (141.4/sq mi)
- Demonyms: Algareño, ña
- Time zone: UTC+1 (CET)
  - Summer (DST): UTC+2 (CEST)
- Postal code: 11639
- Website: algar.es

Algar is a city in the province of Cádiz, Spain. According to the 2005 census, the city has 1,644 inhabitants. Algar is in the White Towns of Andalusia to an altitude of 212 meters.

== Demographics ==
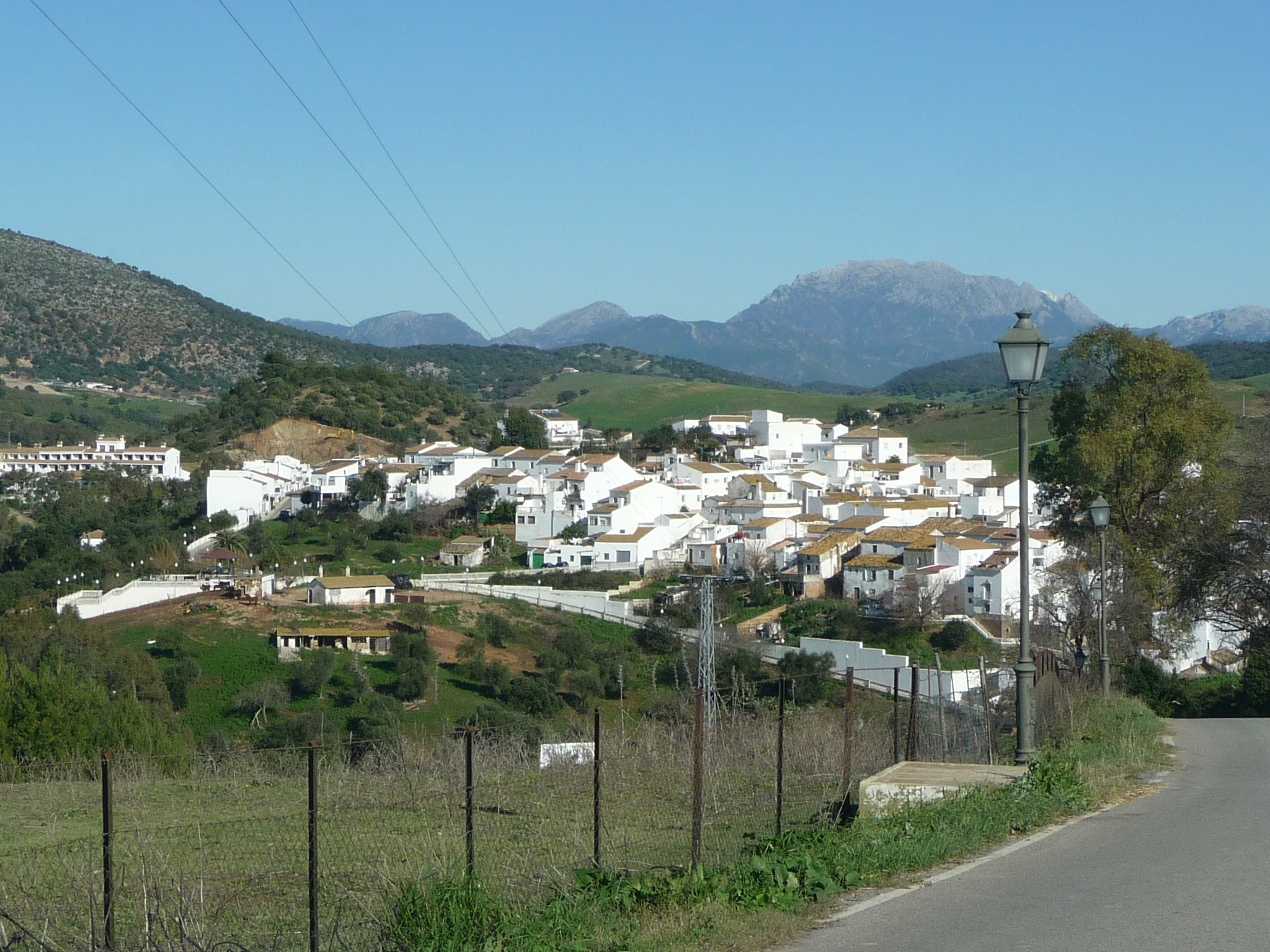
Algar from Tajo del Águila resort

Historical population
| Year | Pop. | ±% |
|---|---|---|
| 1999 | 1,803 | — |
| 2000 | 1,778 | −1.4% |
| 2001 | 1,755 | −1.3% |
| 2002 | 1,714 | −2.3% |
| 2003 | 1,640 | −4.3% |
| 2004 | 1,643 | +0.2% |
| 2005 | 1,644 | +0.1% |
Source: INE (Spain)

== Monuments ==
- Iglesia Parroquial de Santa María de Guadalupe.
- Plaza de Toros de Algar.
- Puerta de Alcalá.

== Economy ==
- Agriculture
- Animal husbandry
- Fur trade
- Wood
- Rural tourism

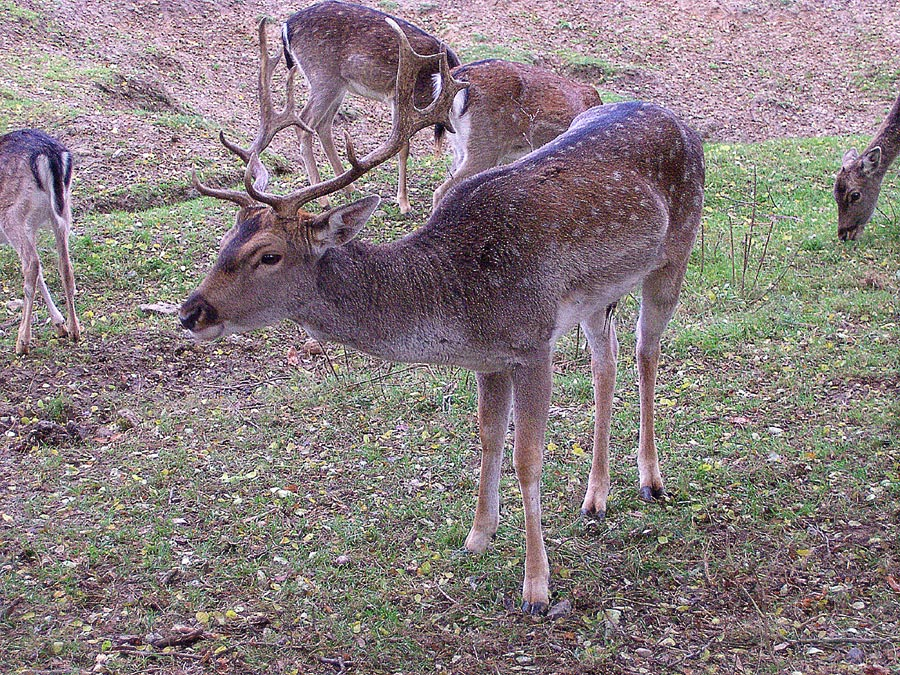
Fallow deer is a typical animal of the Algar area.

== See also ==
- List of municipalities in Cádiz
