= Torre Alháquime =

- Municipality
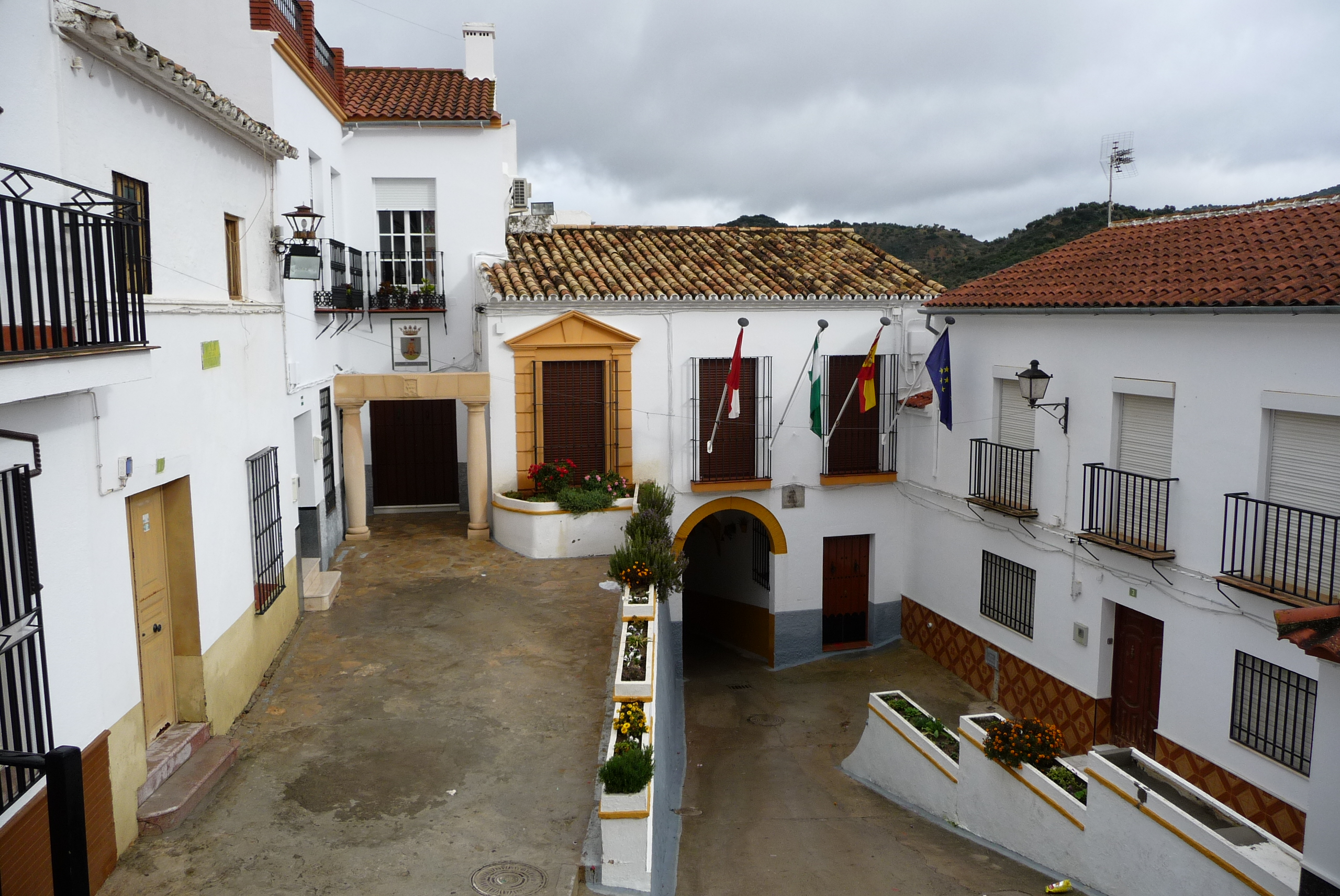
- Town hall

- Flag Coat of arms

- Location in Spain
- Coordinates: 36°55′N 5°14′W
- Country: Spain
- Autonomous community: Andalusia
- Province: Cádiz
- Comarca: Sierra de Cádiz

Government
  - Mayor: Pedro Barroso Salas (PSOE)

Area
  - Total: 17.36 km^{2} (6.70 sq mi)
- Elevation: 495 m (1,624 ft)

Population (2025-01-01)
  - Total: 781
  - Density: 45.0/km^{2} (117/sq mi)
- Demonym: Torreños
- Time zone: UTC+1 (CET)
  - Summer (DST): UTC+2 (CEST)
- Postal code: 11691
- Website: Official website

Torre Alháquime is a village located in the province of Cádiz, southern Spain. It is home to a Moorish castle and cemetery (13th–14th centuries).

== See also ==
- List of municipalities in Cádiz
