= Setenil de las Bodegas =

- Municipality
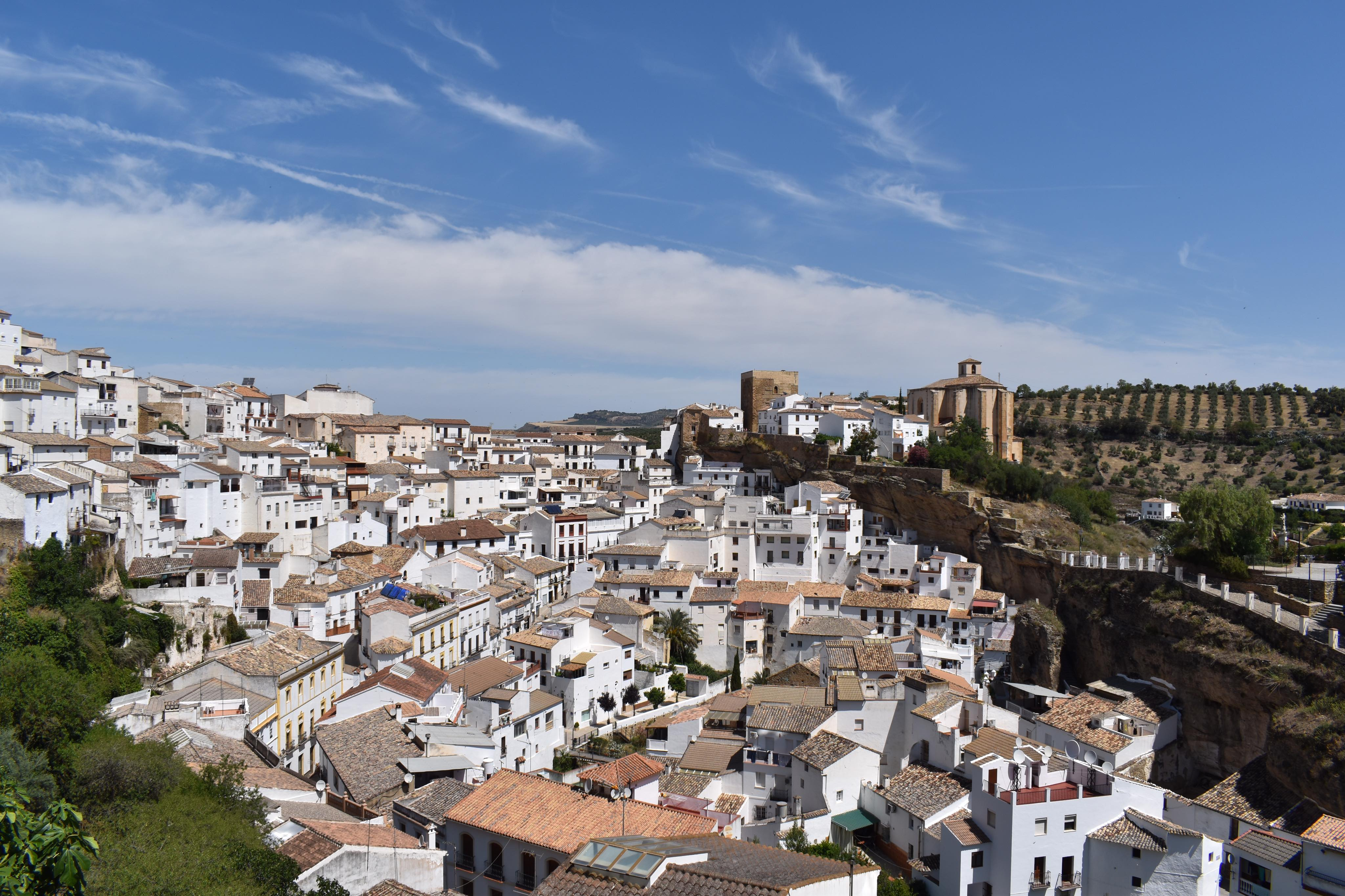

- Flag Coat of arms

- Location in the Province of Cádiz Location in Andalusia Location in Spain
- Coordinates: 36°51′45″N 5°10′53″W
- Country: Spain
- Autonomous community: Andalusia
- Province: Cádiz
- Comarca: Sierra de Cádiz

Government
  - Mayor: Rafael Vargas Villalón (AxSí)

Area
  - Total: 82 km^{2} (32 sq mi)

Population (2025-01-01)
  - Total: 2,634
  - Density: 32/km^{2} (83/sq mi)
- Time zone: UTC+1 (CET)
  - Summer (DST): UTC+2 (CEST)
- Website: setenildelasbodegas.es

Setenil de las Bodegas is a pueblo (town) and municipality in the province of Cádiz, Spain, famous for its dwellings built into a rock formation above the Río Guadalporcún river. According to the 2023 census, the town has a population of 2,638 inhabitants.

Located 157 kilometres (98 miles) northeast of Cádiz, it is situated alongside the Rio Trejo river.

== History ==
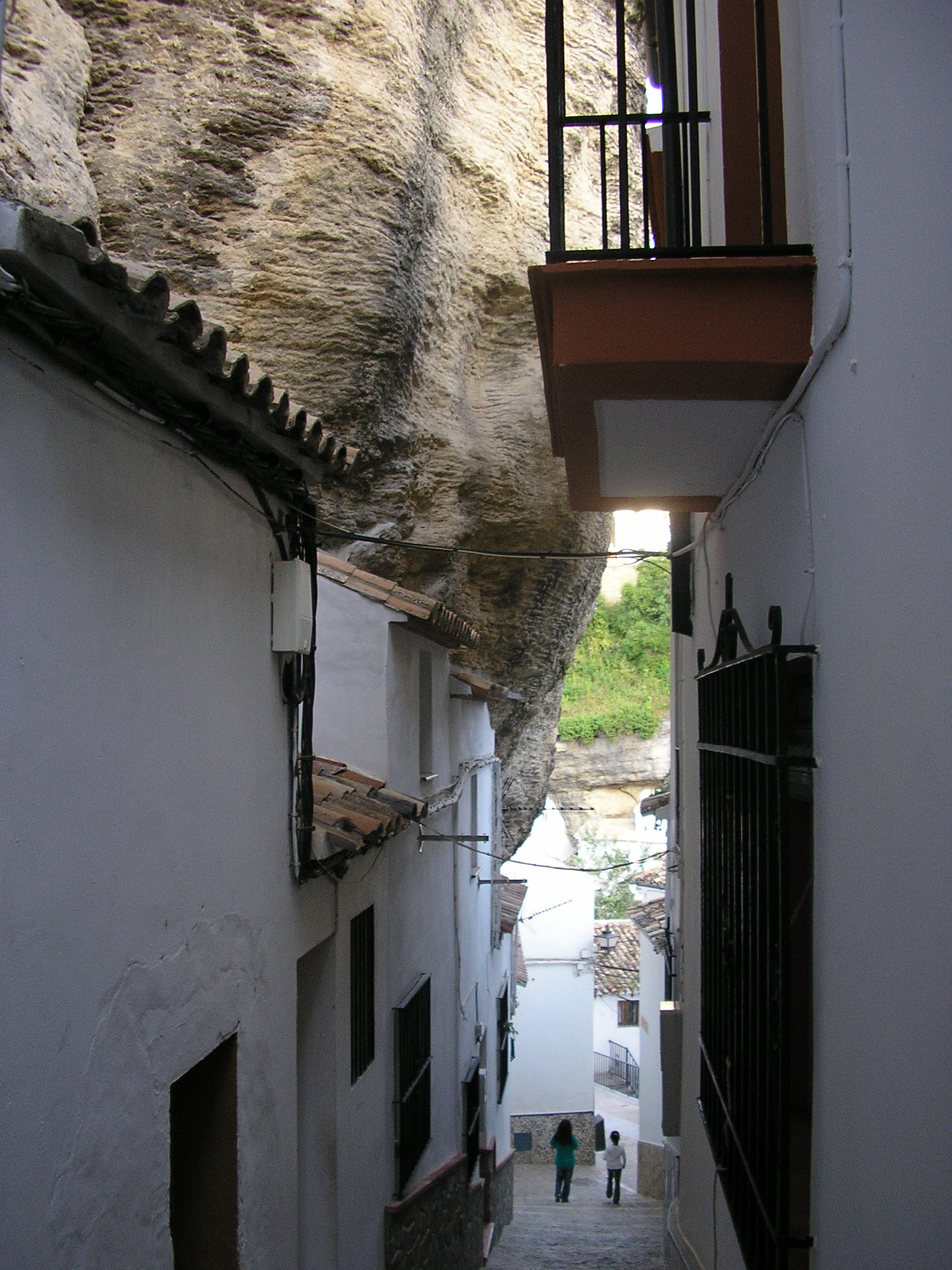
Street in Setenil

Modern Setenil evolved from a fortified Moorish town that occupied a bluff overlooking a sharp bend in the Rio Trejo, northwest of Ronda. The castle dates from at least the Almohad period in the 12th century.

The site was occupied during the Roman invasion of the region in the 1st century AD. Setenil was once believed to be the successor of the Roman town of Laccipo, but it was subsequently proved that Laccipo became the town of Casares in Malaga. Given the evidence of other nearby cave-dwelling societies, such as those at the Cueva de la Pileta west of Ronda, where habitation has been tracked back more than 25,000 years, it is possible that Setenil was occupied much earlier. Most evidence of this would have been erased by continuous habitation.

Tradition holds that the town's Castilian name came from the Roman Latin phrase septem nihil ('seven times nothing'). This is said to refer to the Moorish town's resistance to Christian assault, allegedly being captured only after seven sieges. This took place in the final years of the Christian Reconquest. Besieged unsuccessfully in 1407, Setenil finally fell in 1484 when Christian forces expelled the Moorish occupants. Using gunpowder artillery, the Christians took fifteen days to capture the castle whose ruins dominate the town today.

Due to the strategic importance of Setenil, the victory was celebrated widely in Castile and was the source of several legends in local folklore. Isabella I of Castile is said to have miscarried during the siege with the ermita of San Sebastian being built as a tribute to the dead child, who was named Sebastian. However, there appears to be no historical basis to this story.

The full name of Setenil de las Bodegas dates from the 15th century, when new Christian settlers, in addition to maintaining the Arab olive and almond groves, introduced vineyards. The first two crops still flourish in the district but the once flourishing wineries—bodegas— were wiped out by the phylloxera insect infestation of the 1860s, which effectively destroyed most European vine stocks.

== Demographics ==
Historical population
Year	Pop.	±%
1999	3,099	—
2000	3,067	−1.0%
2001	3,051	−0.5%
2002	3,043	−0.3%
2003	3,014	−1.0%
2004	3,015	+0.0%
2005	3,016	+0.0%
2023	2,638	−12.5%
Source: INE (Spain), (Data Commons)

== Gallery ==
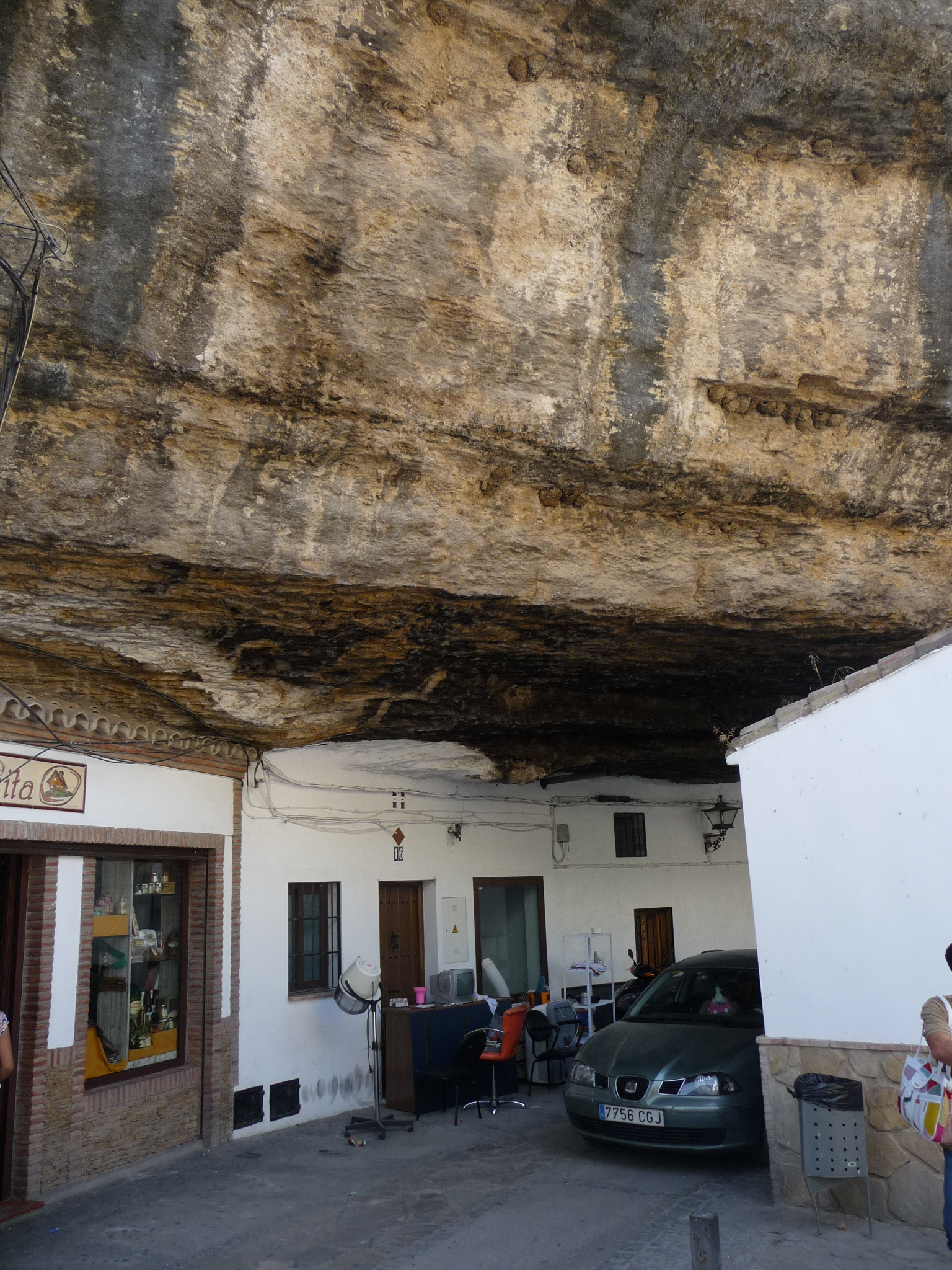

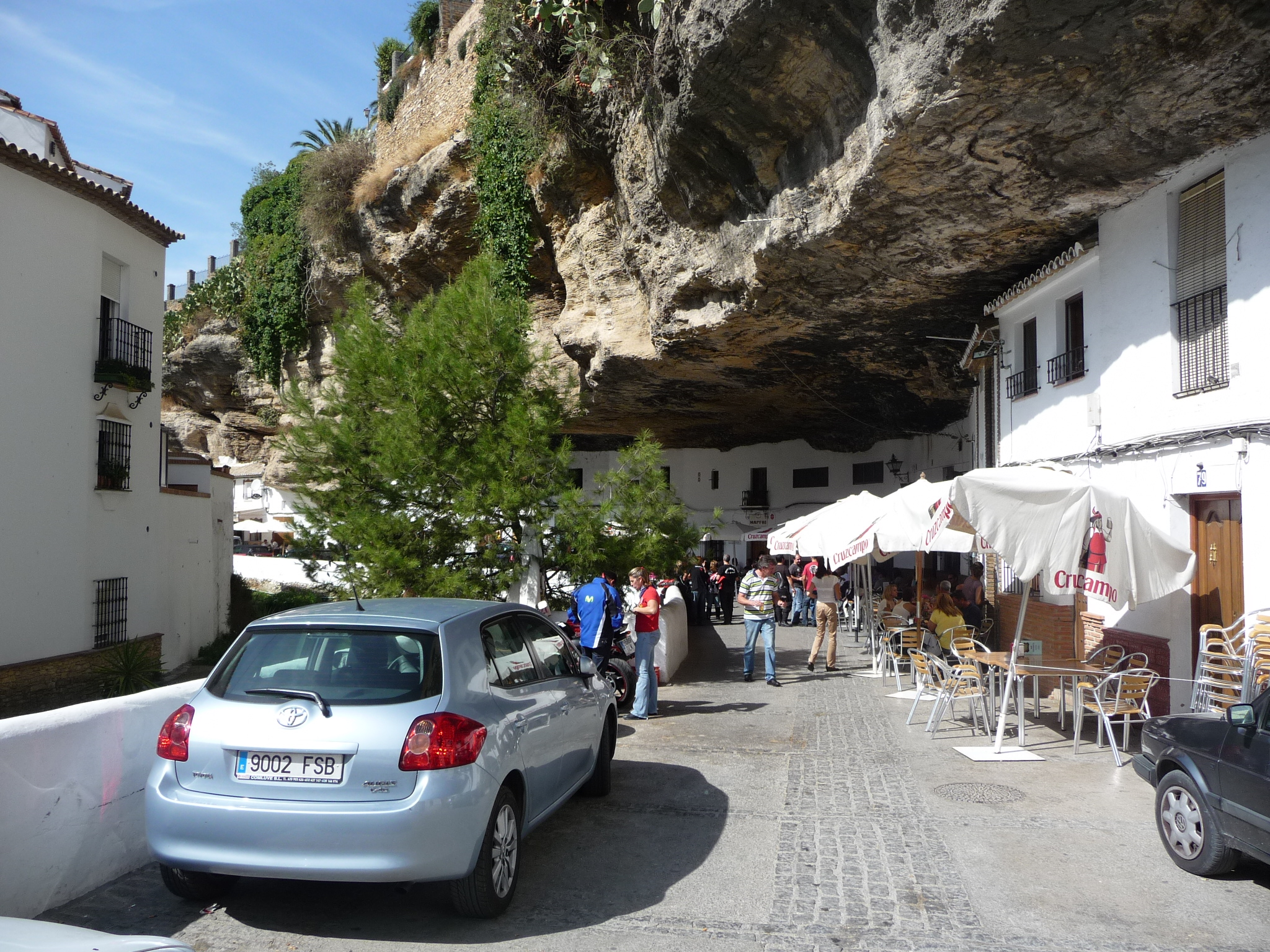

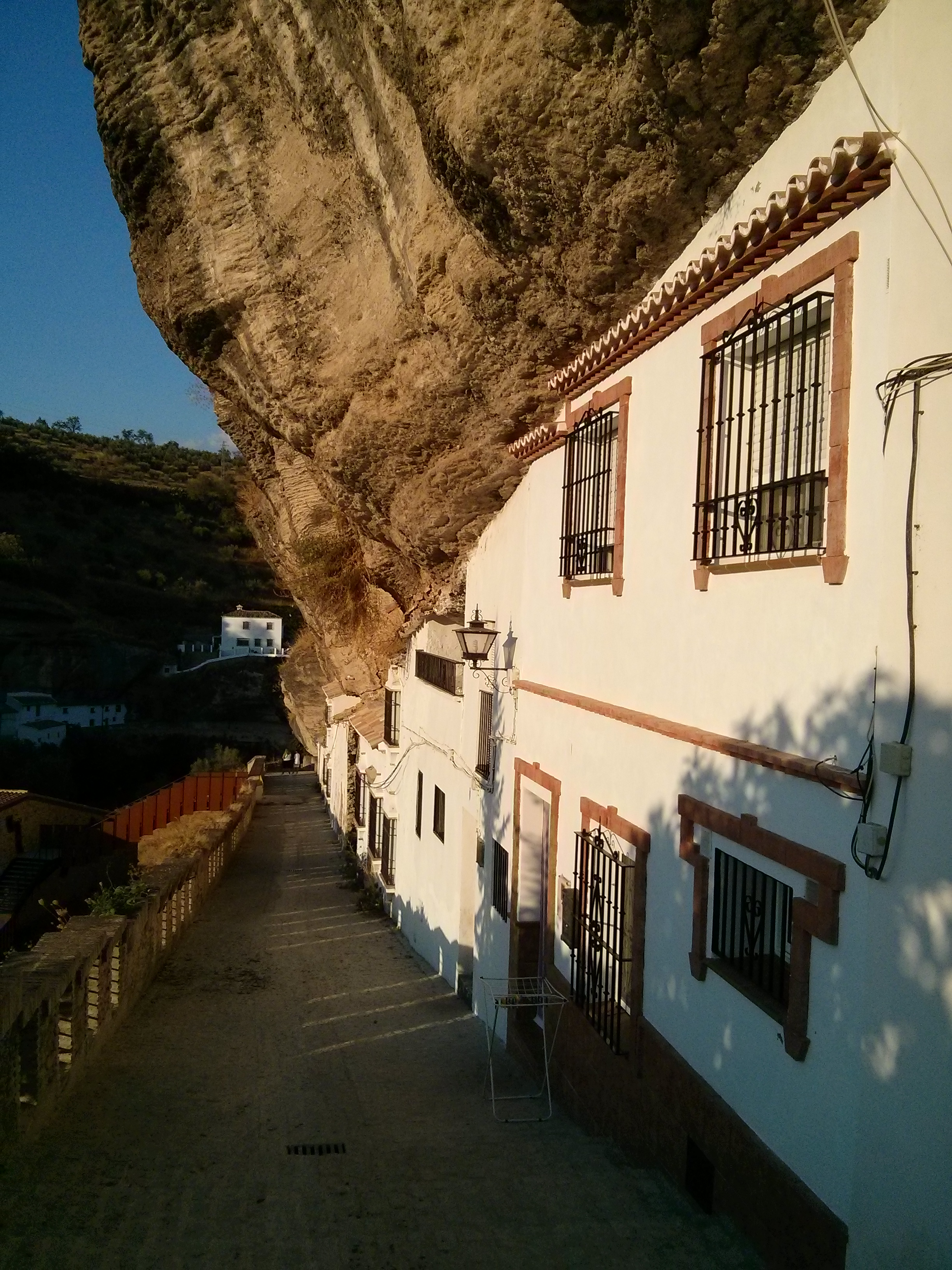

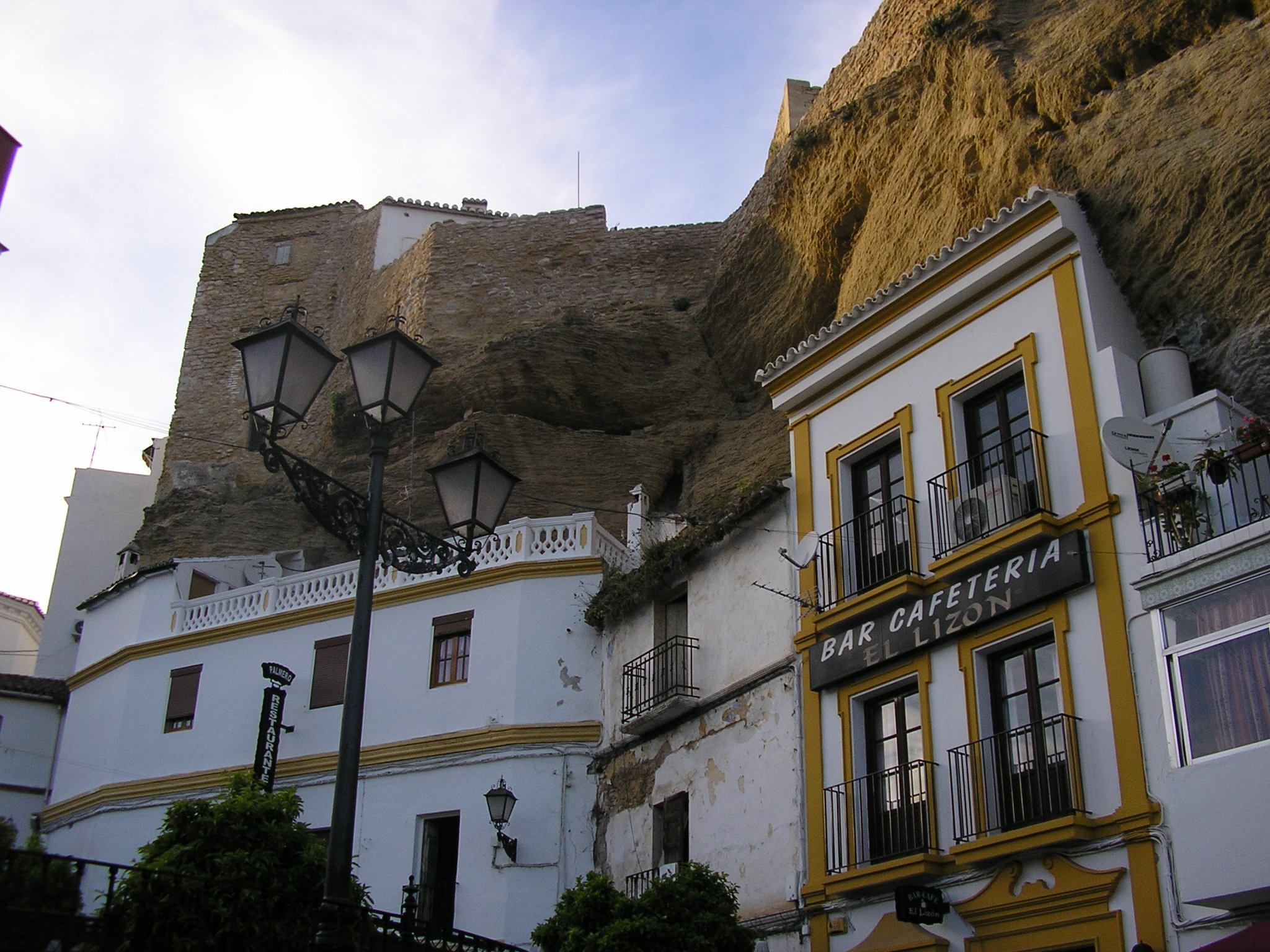

== See also ==
- List of municipalities in Cádiz
