= Zahara de la Sierra =

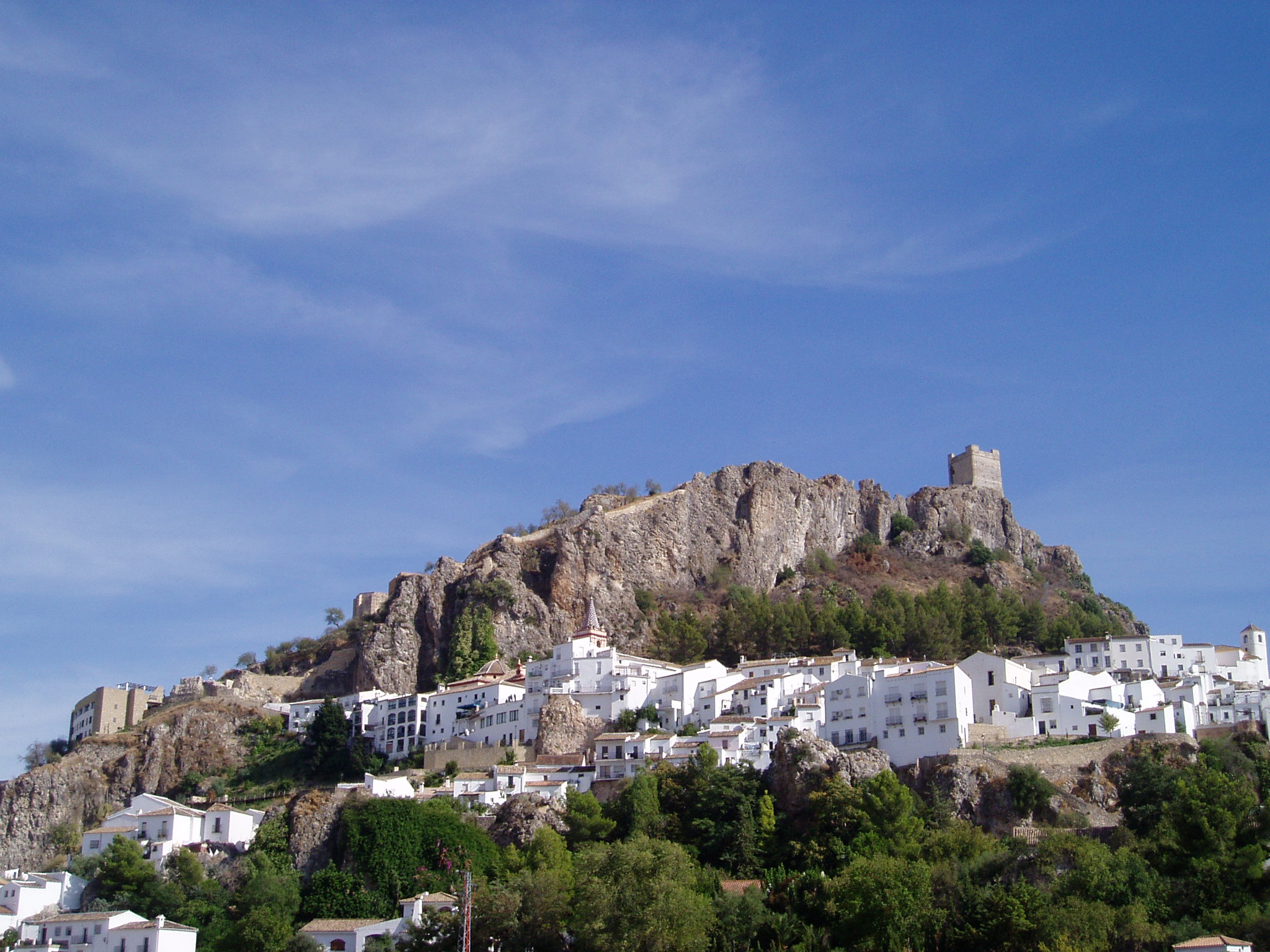

- Flag Coat of arms

- Location in the Province of Cádiz Zahara de la Sierra (Andalusia) Zahara de la Sierra (Spain)
- Coordinates: 36°50.3′N 5°23.4′W
- Autonomous community: Andalusia
- Province: Cádiz
- Comarca: Sierra de Cádiz

Government
  - Mayor: Santiago Galván Gómez

Area
  - Total: 72 km^{2} (28 sq mi)
- Elevation: 500 m (1,600 ft)

Population (2025-01-01)
  - Total: 1,344
  - Density: 19/km^{2} (48/sq mi)
- Time zone: UTC+1 (CET)
  - Summer (DST): UTC+2 (CEST)
- Website: Official website

Zahara de la Sierra is a municipality in the province of Cádiz in the hills of Andalusia, southern Spain. It is perched on a mountain, overlooking a valley and a man-made lake formed by the dam that must be driven over to access the town. It is considered to be one of the pueblos blancos or "white towns" because the overwhelming majority of the buildings are white.

The town was originally a Moorish outpost, overlooking the valley. Due to its position between Ronda and Seville, it was a perfect site for a castle to be built to serve as a fortress in case of attack. The remains of the Moorish castle still exist. It was ruled by Arabs until 1407. It was recaptured by the Emirate of Granada in 1481. This capture gave a pretext to Castile's war against Granada. It was finally captured by Castilian troops under command of Rodrigo Ponce de León, Duke of Cádiz in 1483.

The Garganta Verde canyon is located nearby.

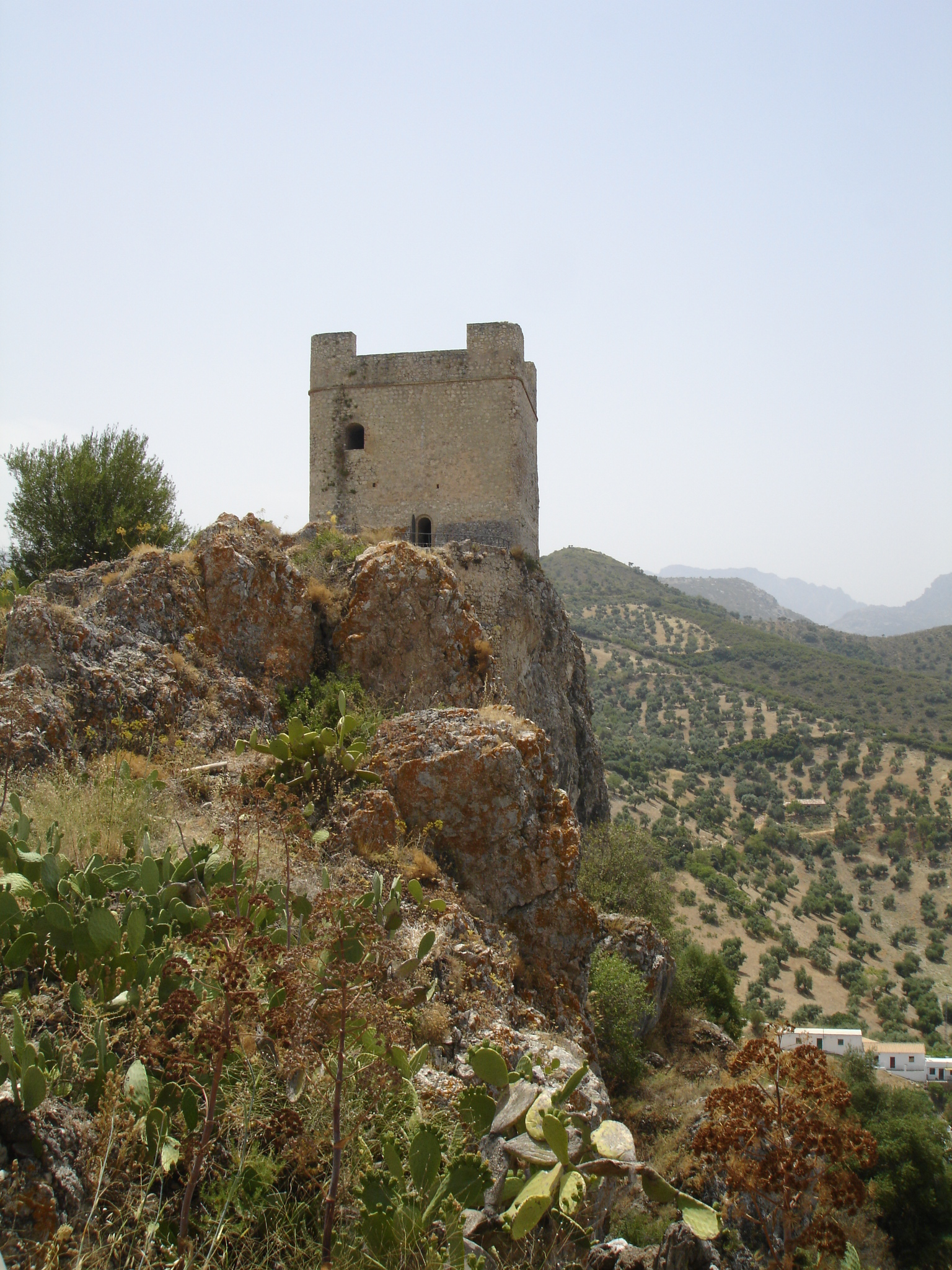
The castle

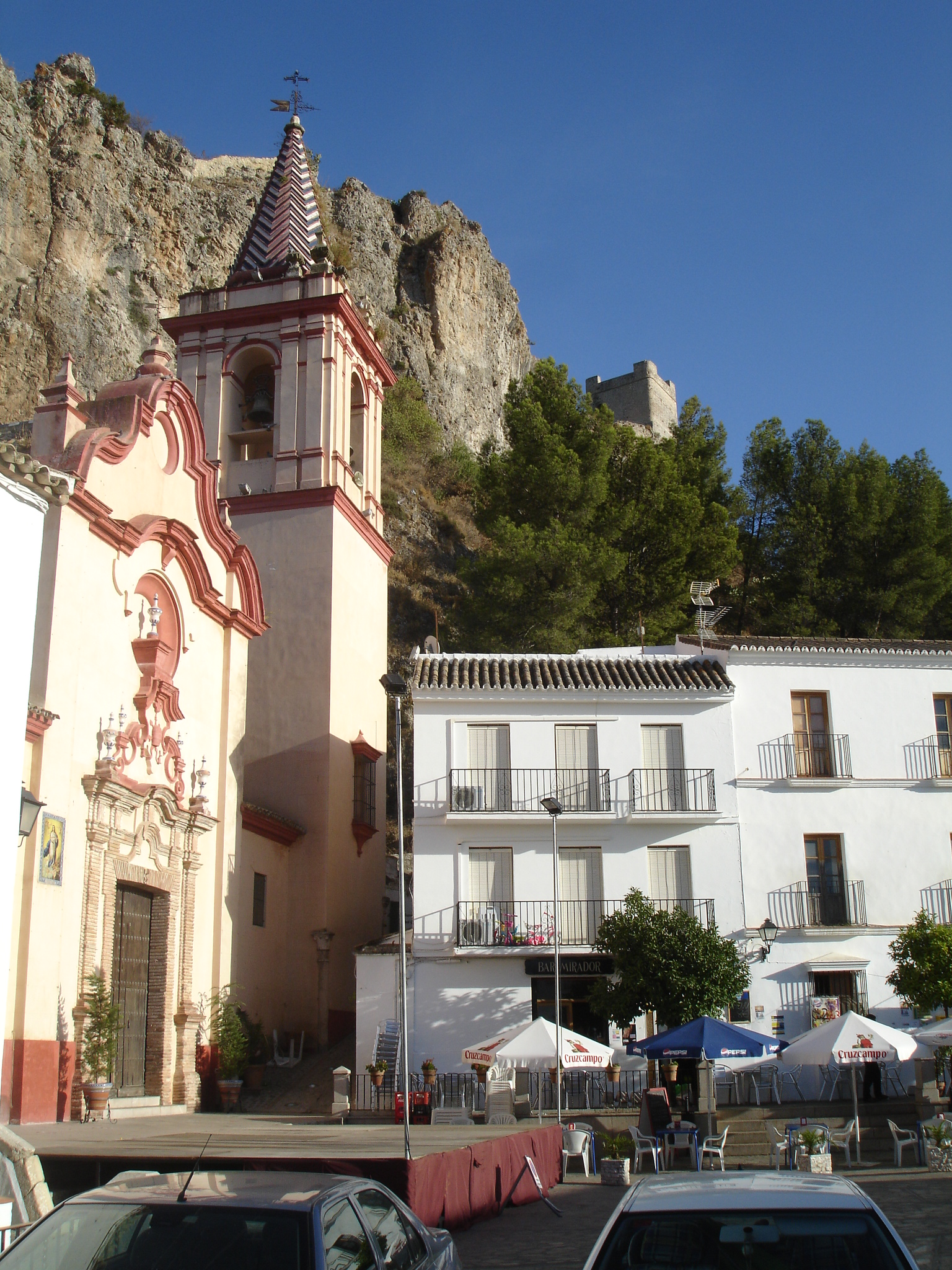
View in the town

== See also ==
- List of municipalities in Cádiz
