= Puerto del Boyar =

Road in Sierra de Grazalema Natural Park

Coordinates: 36°45′21″N 5°23′42″W

The Puerto de las Palomas is a road through two mountains inside the Sierra de Grazalema Natural Park, separating Sierra del Pinar and Sierra del Endrinal.

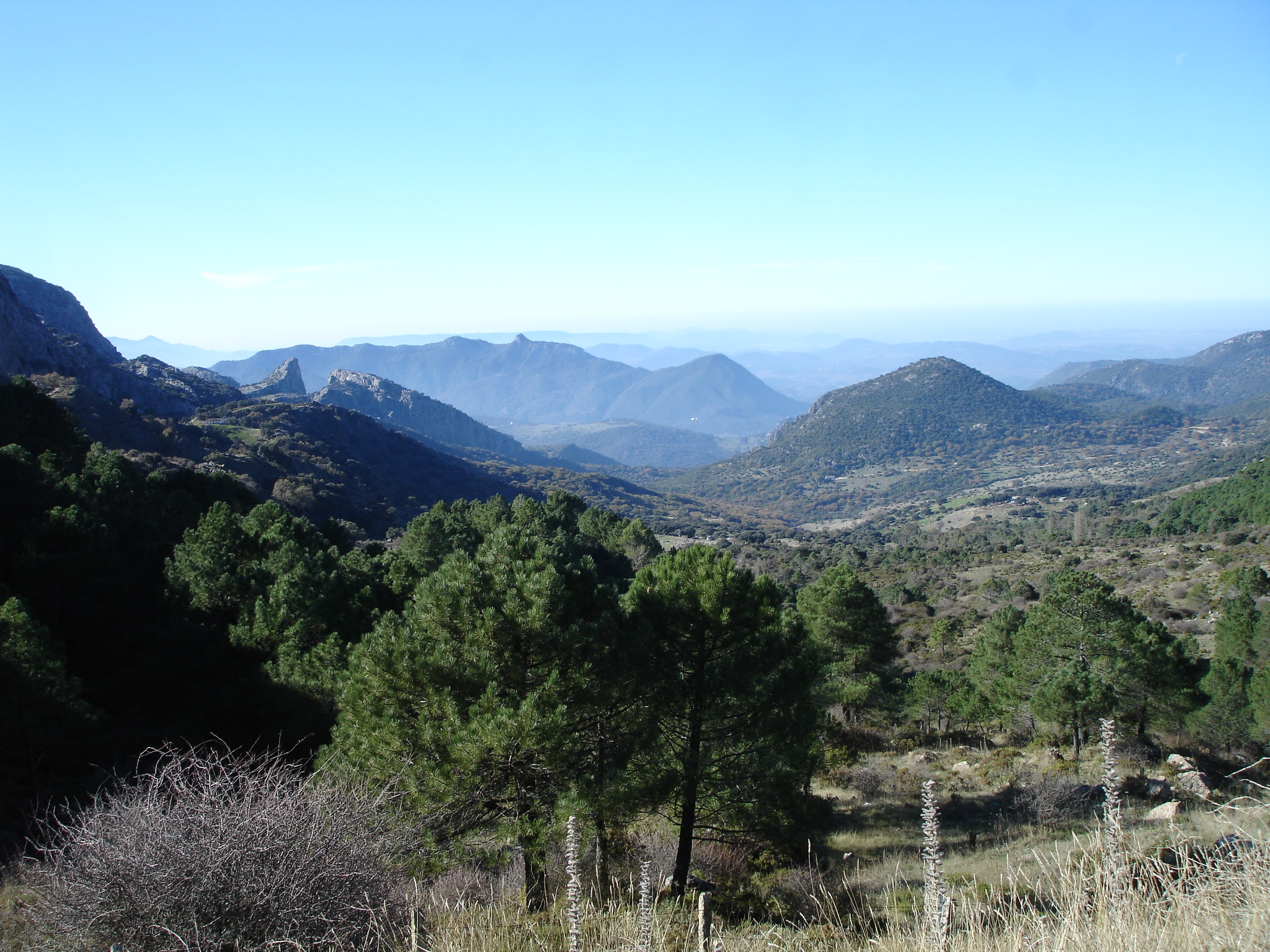
View of Salto del Cabrero from Puerto del Boyar

It is located in Grazalema municipality (Province of Cádiz) at 1103 meters high.

== Views ==
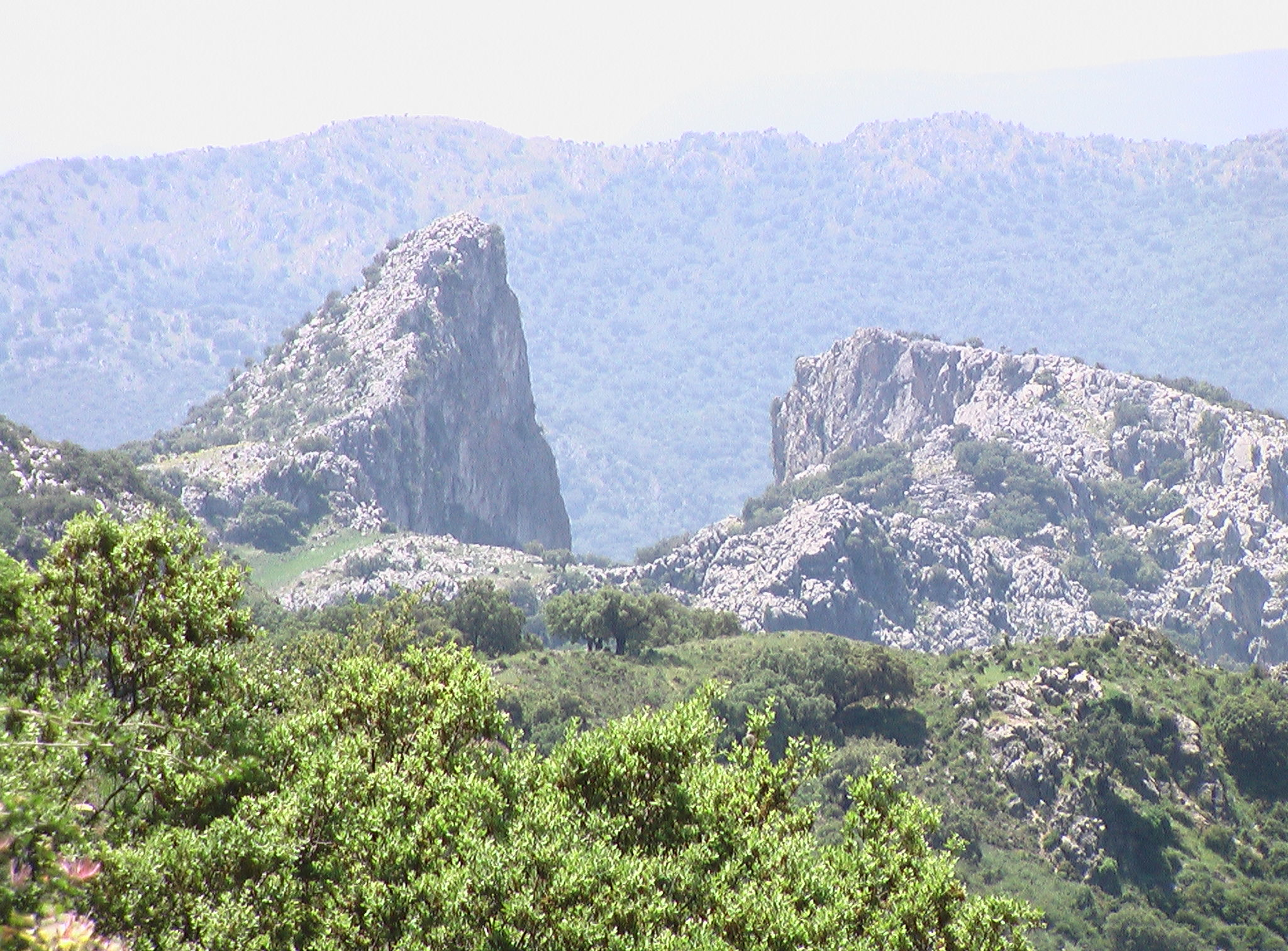
Salto del Cabrero

From it there is a nice view of the depresión del Boyar and Salto del Cabrero. When sky is clear, also the bay of Cádiz can be seen.

== Access ==
You can get to it by car (it has a small parking lot), or by two hiking paths:

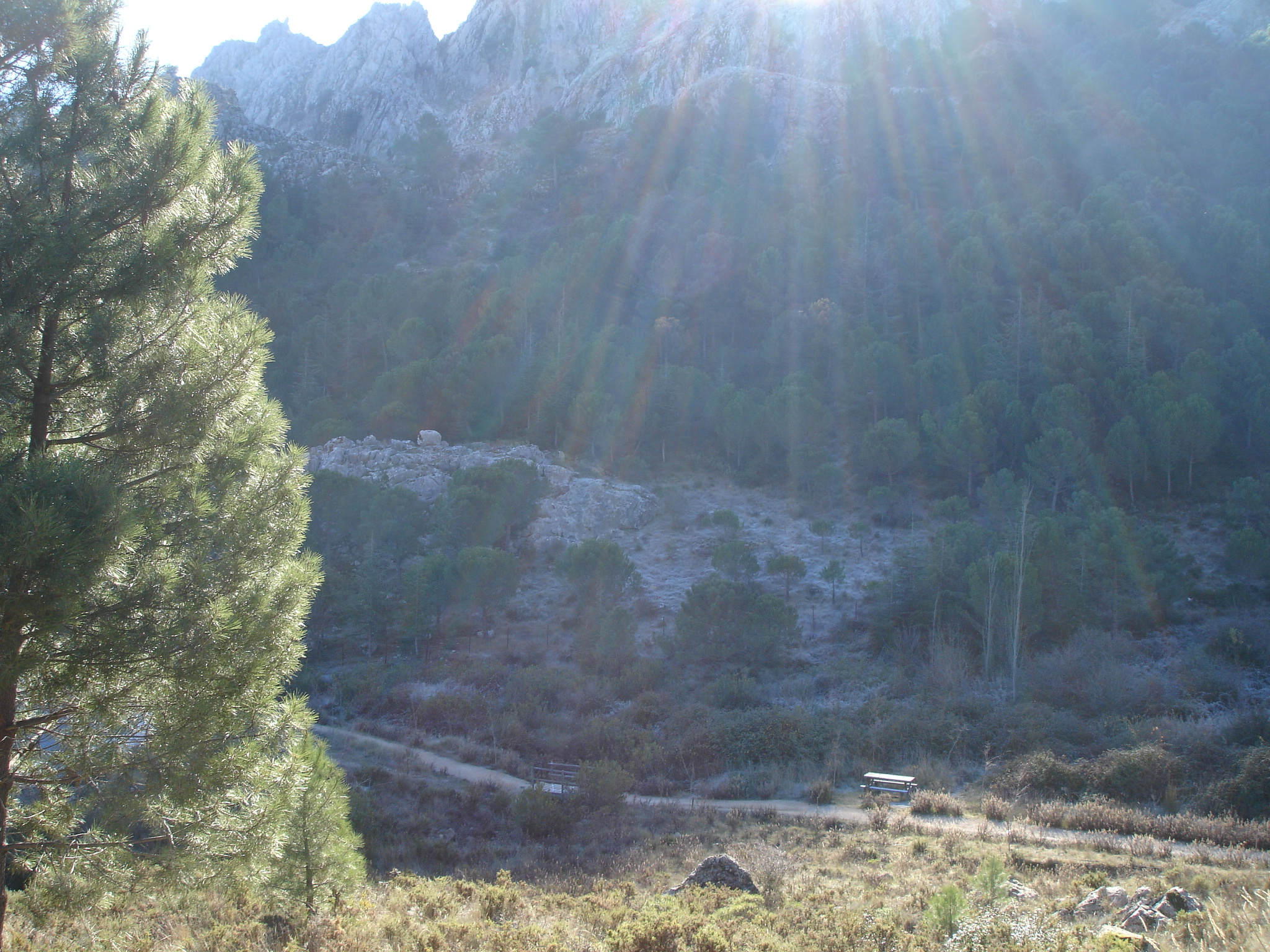
Path to Grazalema frozen

- Sendero del Salto de Cabrero: it takes you to Salto del Cabrero and Benaocaz
- Sendero de Grazalema: it takes you to Grazalema

== Others ==
Due to its location and orientation it usually gets covered by snow when temperatures are low in wintertime, being the only place in the province of Cádiz where snow can be seen some days during year.

== See also ==
- Puerto de las Palomas
