= Puerto de las Palomas =

Mountain pass in Sierra de Grazalema Natural Park

Coordinates: 36°47′15″N 5°22′35″W

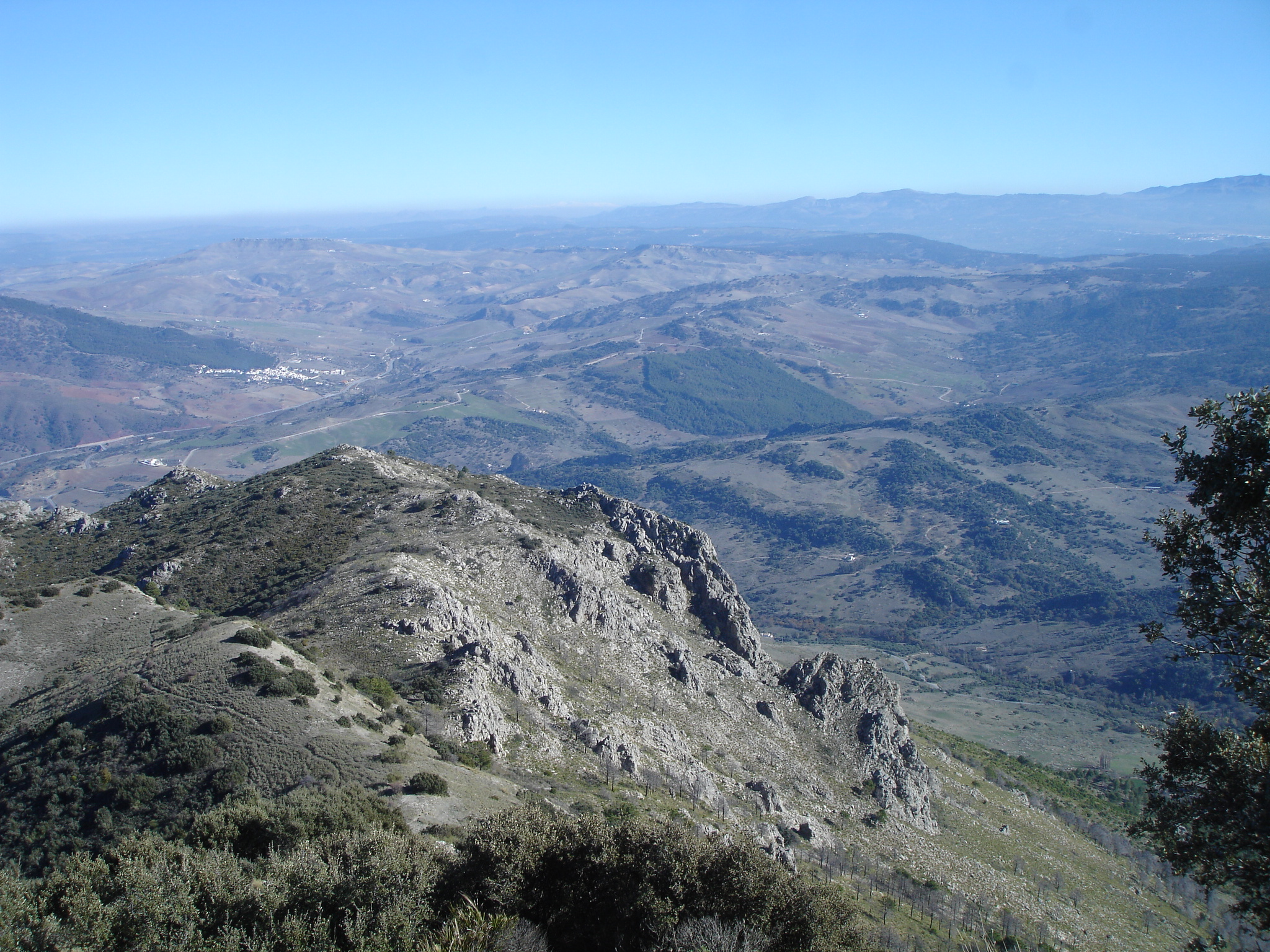
View from Puerto de las Palomas

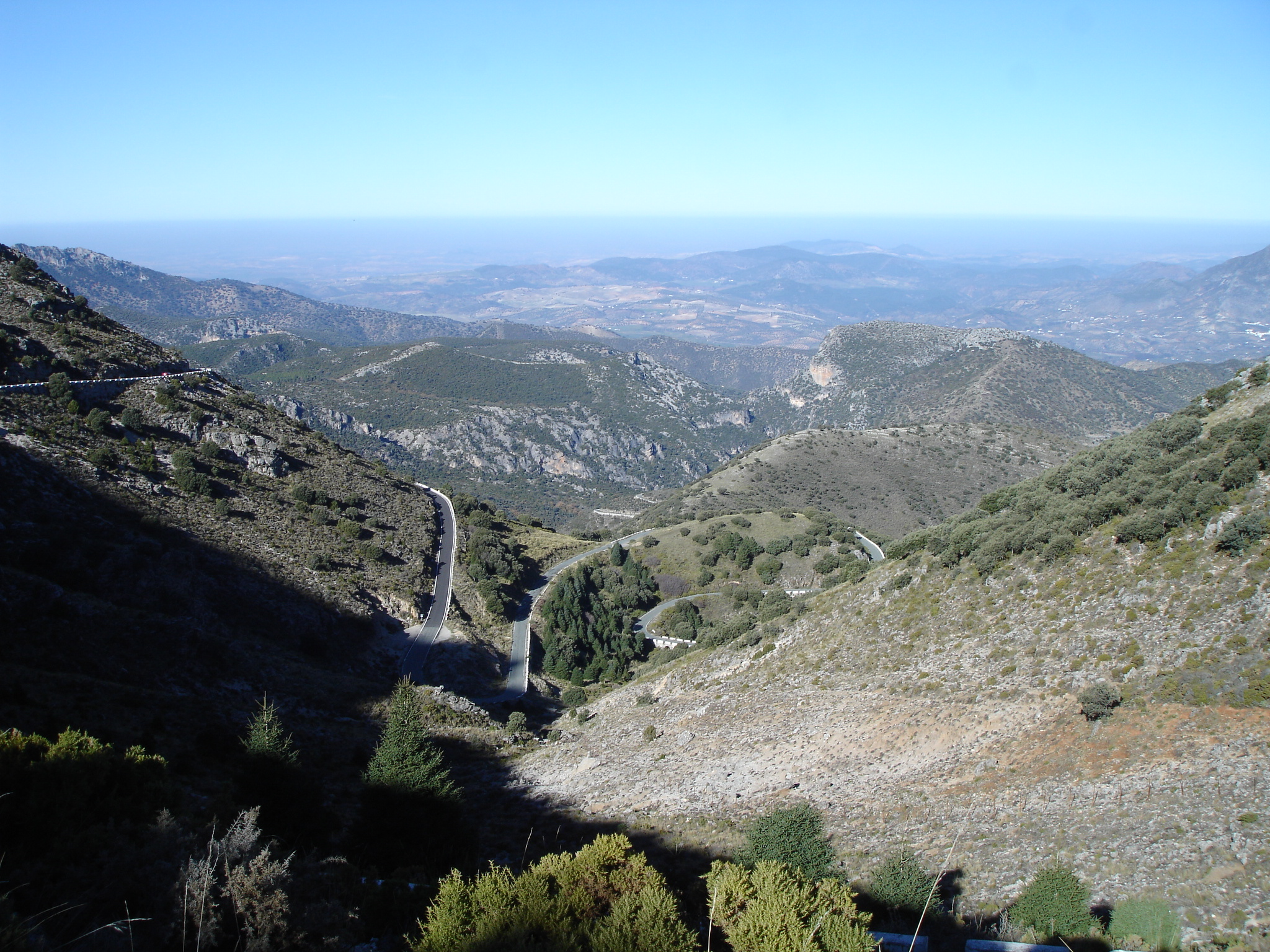
View to the north

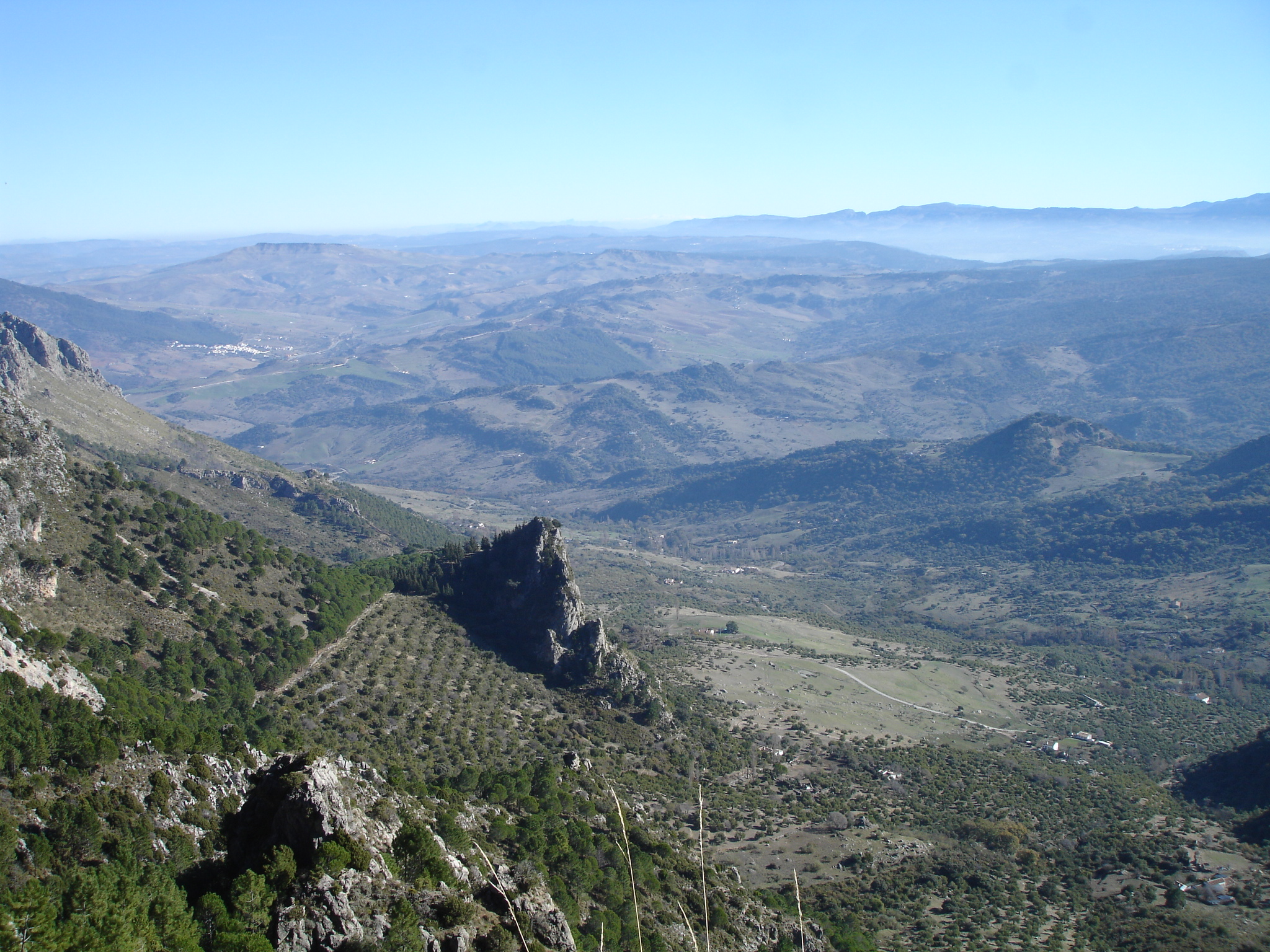
View to the south

The Puerto de las Palomas is a mountain pass in the Sierra de Grazalema Natural Park, on the CA-9104 road connecting Grazalema and Zahara de la Sierra villages.

There are great views from it, and there's a nice hiking path to see the northern part of provinces of Cadiz and Málaga as well as the southern part of the Seville one.

There are eight other Puerto de las Palomas in Spain, among which six are in Andalusia.

The access road from Zahara de la Sierra has very winding and steep slopes.

== See also ==
- Puerto del Boyar
