= Polène =

French leathergoods company

- Type: Private
- Industry: Luxury leather goods
- Founded: 2016
- Founders: Antoine Mothay; Mathieu Mothay; Elsa Mothay
- Headquarters: Paris
- Area served: Worldwide
- Products: Handbags, leather accessories, jewelry
- Parent: L Catterton (minority stake)
- Website: www.polene-paris.com

Polène is a French leathergoods brand founded in 2016 by Antoine Mothay and his two siblings, Mathieu and Elsa. The company uses Italian leather and its products are all made in Ubrique, Spain. In September 2024, LVMH-backed private equity firm L Catterton purchased a stake in Polène.

== Retail locations ==
French architect Valeriane Lazard designed the Paris and New York boutiques. The brand has flagship boutiques in Paris on Rue de Richelieu and Champs-Élysées, in New York on Broadway in Soho, in Tokyo in Minamiaoyama, in Milan on Via Manzoni, in Seoul on Garosu-gil, London, Hamburg, Copenhagen and Beijing.

Polène has leased a 7,000 sq ft space on Oak Street in Chicago. In September 2025, Polène announced the opening of a 68m² experiential space, located inside its boutique at 71 Neuer Wall in Hamburg.
