= Eleventy (brand) =

Italian fashion brand

Eleventy is a Milan-based Italian luxury fashion brand founded in 2007 by Marco Baldassari and Paolo Zuntini. The brand is built on the concept of "Smart Luxury," emphasizing a versatile, understated style that blends traditional Italian tailoring with modern comfort.

Andrea Scuderi joined Eleventy as a partner and operations executive in 2009. In 2014, private equity firm Vei Capital purchased a 51% stake in the business. In 2016, the company established its U.S. headquarters in New York. Eleventy is now majority controlled (65%) by the Fashion Cube fund—a holding company composed of VEI Capital and a Gulf financial group that manages the sales networks. Eleventy employs 200 people, and has 18 directly operated monobrand stores and 22 franchised monobrand stores. Eleventy is vended by approximately 300 multibrand retailers. Eleventy opened in Toronto in 2025, and in Chicago and Santorini in 2026.
