= Castle of Aznalmara =

- Castillo de Aznalmara (Spanish)
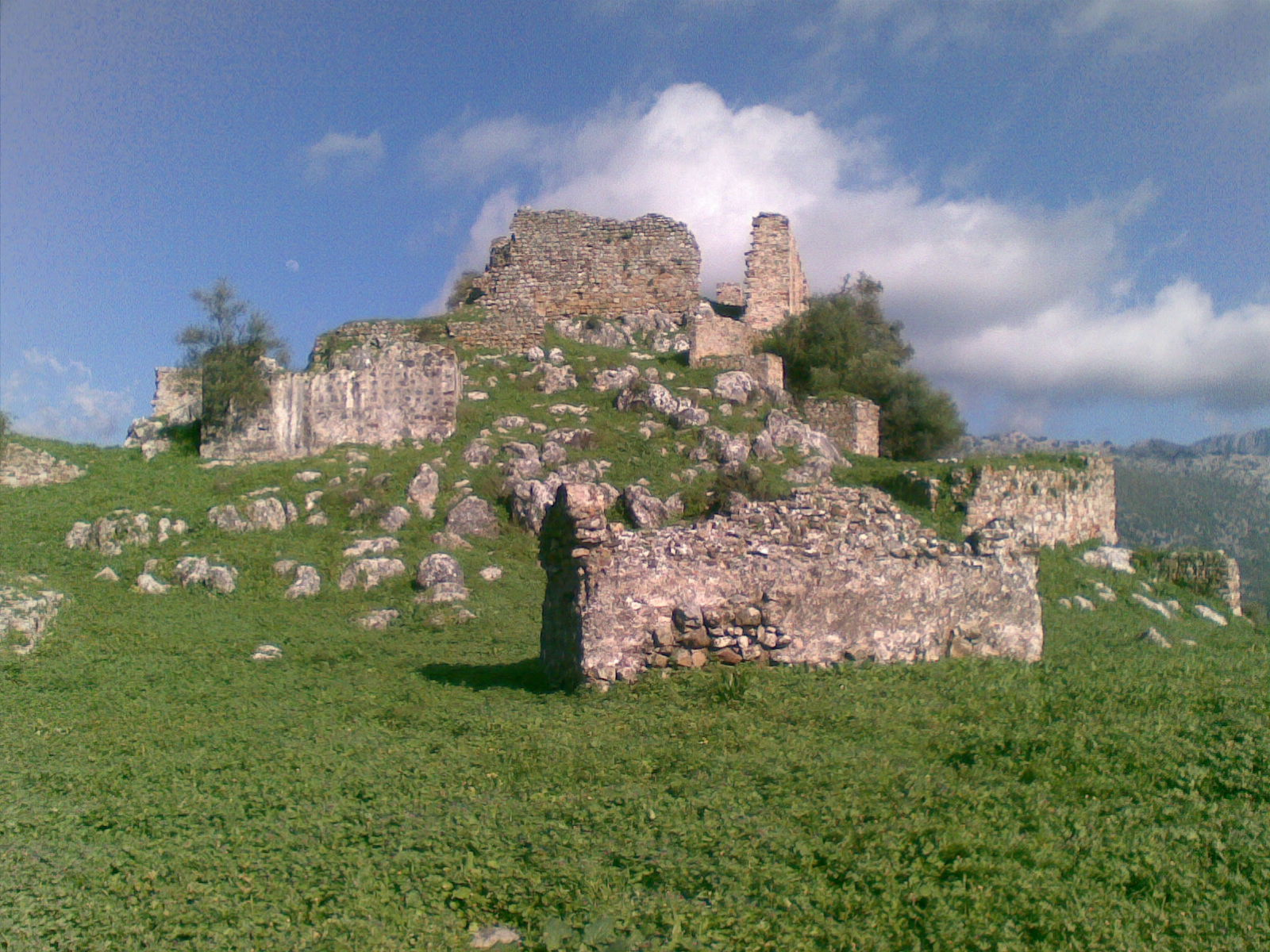

- Location within Spain
- 36.729438°N 5.466270°W
- Location: Ubrique, Spain

Spanish Cultural Heritage
- Official name: Castillo de Aznalmara
- Type: Non-movable
- Criteria: Monument
- Designated: 1993
- Reference no.: RI-51-0007642

The Castle of Aznalmara (Spanish: Castillo de Aznalmara) is a castle located in Ubrique, Spain. It was declared Bien de Interés Cultural in 1993.
