= Benaocaz =

- Municipality
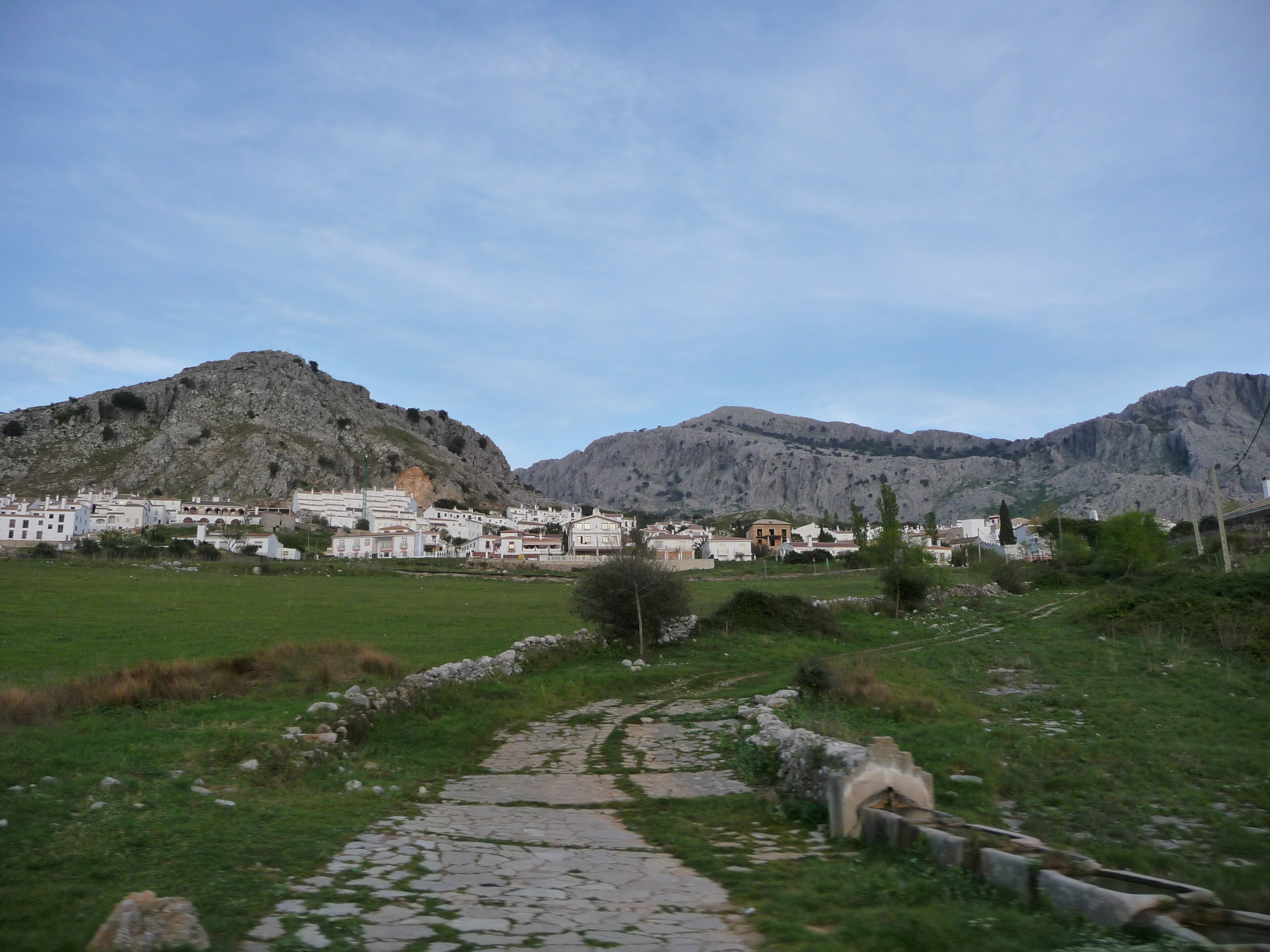
- Benaocaz, the Roman road and the source of las Piletas

- Coat of arms

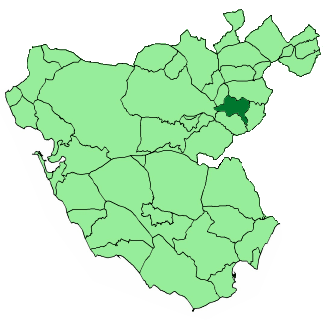

- Location in Spain
- Coordinates: 36°42′N 5°25′W
- Country: Spain
- Autonomous community: Andalusia
- Province: Cádiz
- Comarca: Sierra de Cádiz

Government
  - Mayor: Juan María Mangana Macías (2007) (PP)

Area
  - Total: 69.39 km^{2} (26.79 sq mi)
- Elevation: 793 m (2,602 ft)

Population (2025-01-01)
  - Total: 742
  - Density: 10.7/km^{2} (27.7/sq mi)
- Demonym(s): Benaocaceño, ña
- Time zone: UTC+1 (CET)
  - Summer (DST): UTC+2 (CEST)
- Postal code: 11612
- Website: benaocaz.es

Benaocaz is a village located in the province of Cádiz, Spain. It is located within the Sierra de Grazalema Natural Park.

According to the 2006 census, the city has a population of 729 inhabitants.

The town's name dates back to the Moors, and derives from The Arabic Ocaz family, with ‘Ben’ meaning “son of”. In the upper part of the town, Moorish and 8th century ruins are evident.

Declared an historic site, the village includes the castle of Aznalmara which dates to the 13th and 14th centuries.

== Demographics ==
Historical population
Year	Pop.	±%
1999	632	—
2000	659	+4.3%
2001	662	+0.5%
2002	668	+0.9%
2003	672	+0.6%
2004	702	+4.5%
2005	729	+3.8%
Source: INE (Spain)

== Gallery ==
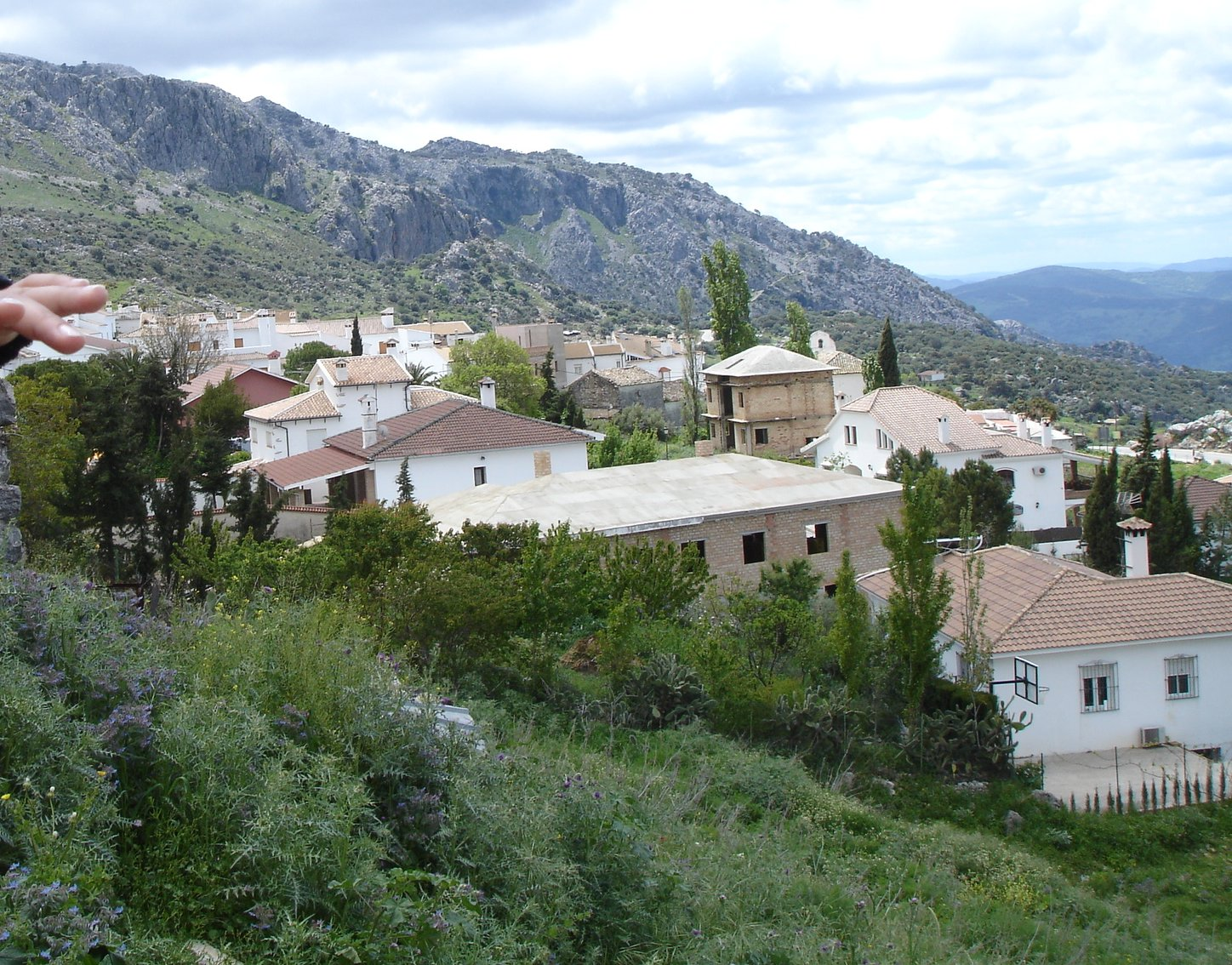
Benaocaz

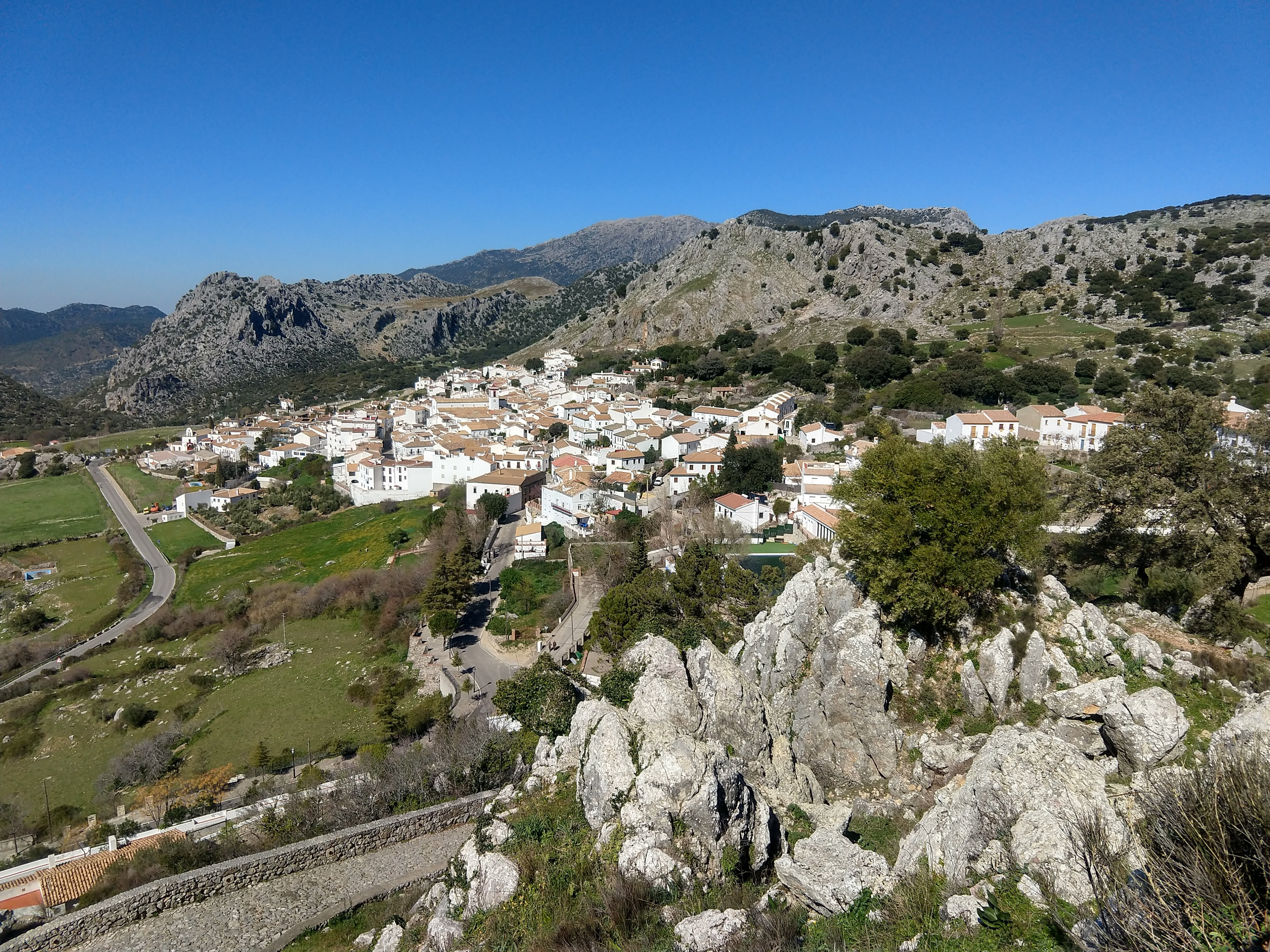
Benaocaz seen from the Hermita del Calvario

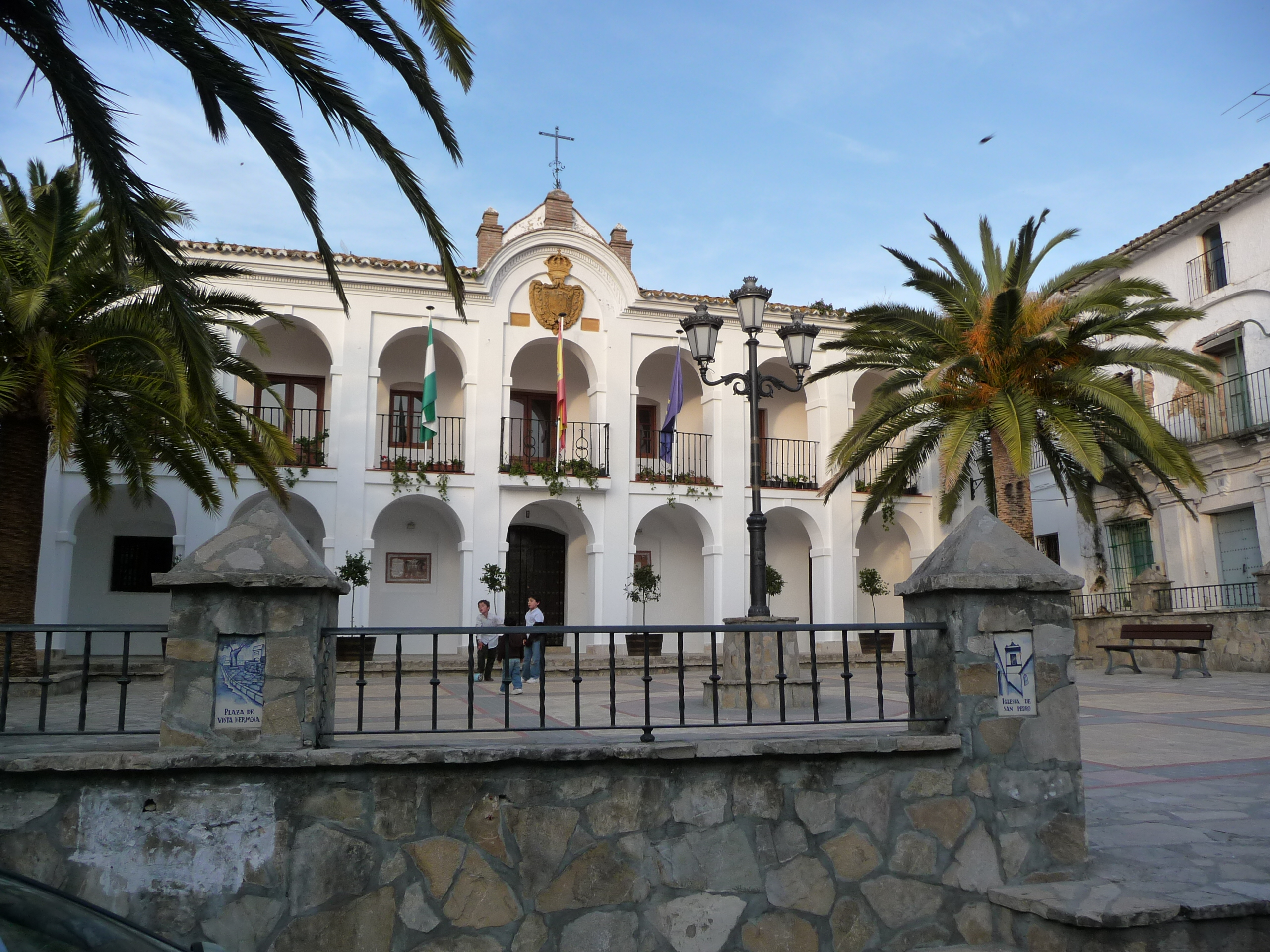
Town hall

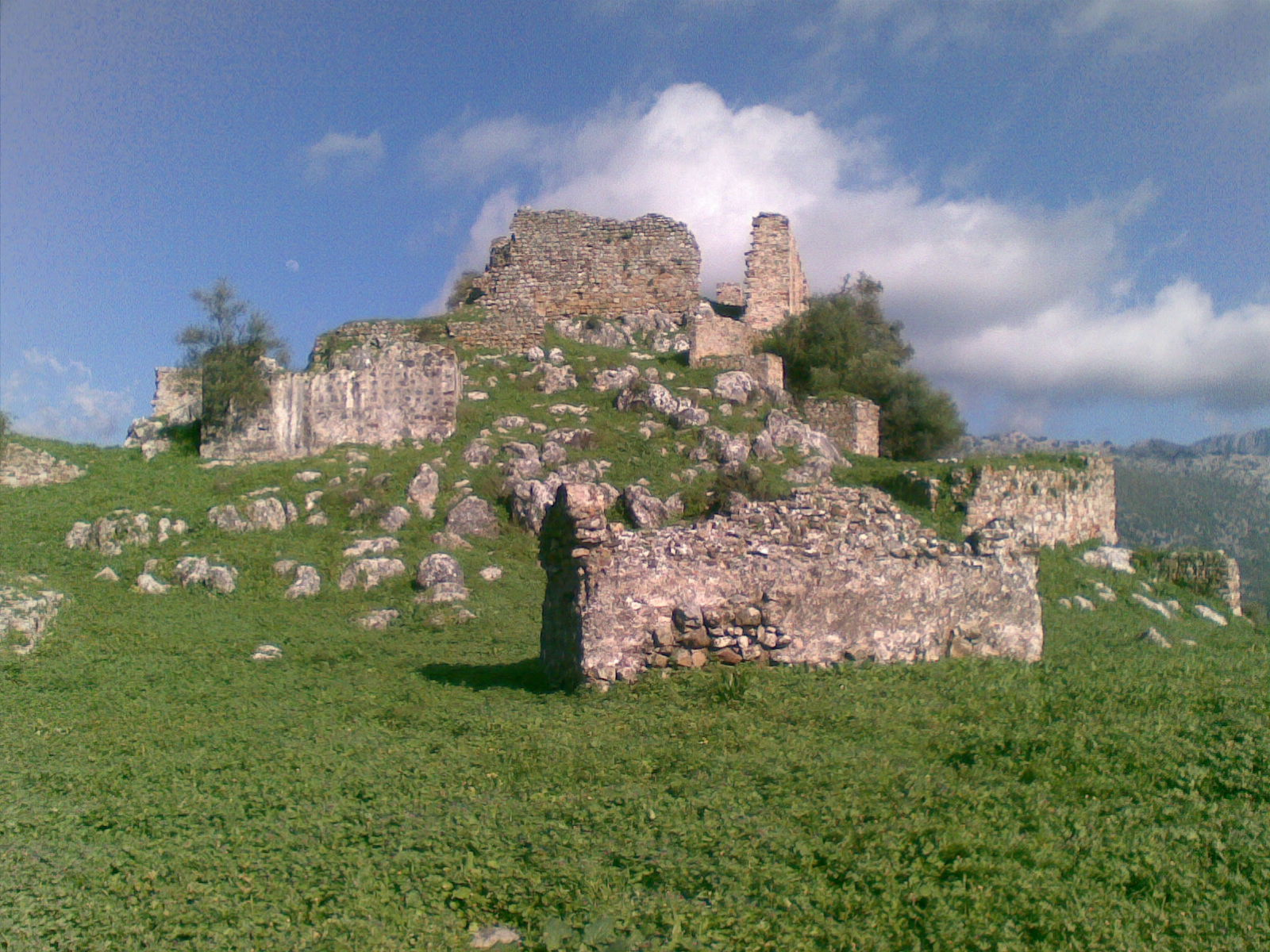
Castle of Aznalmara

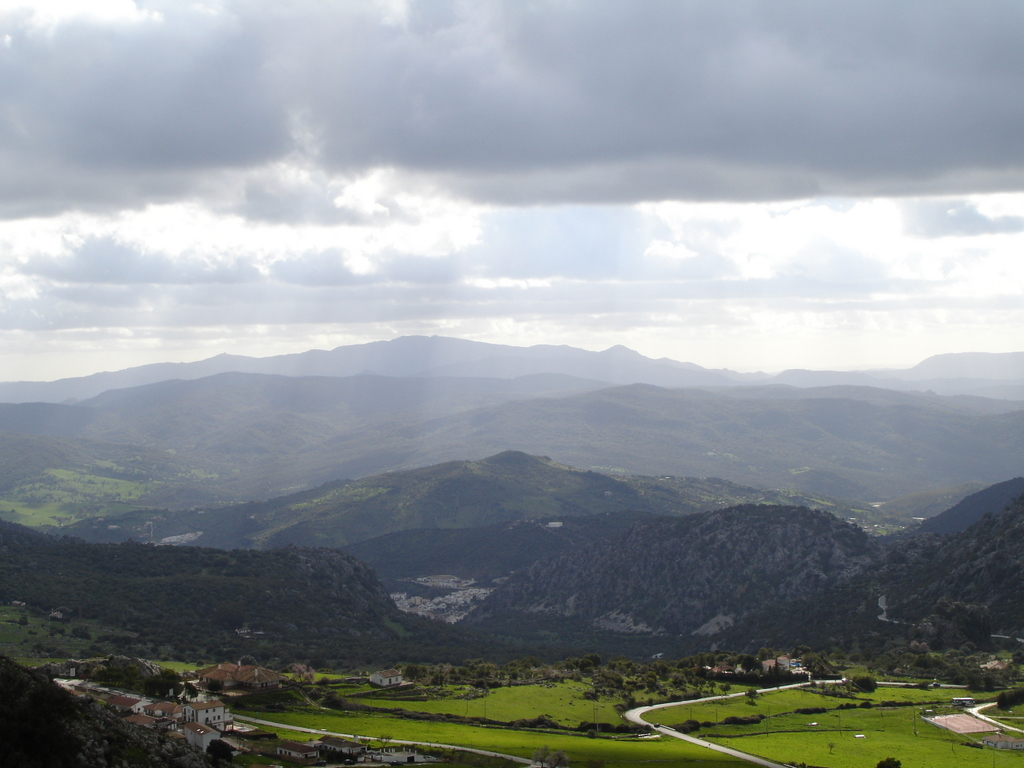
Ubrique and Grazalema Natural Park seen from Benaocaz

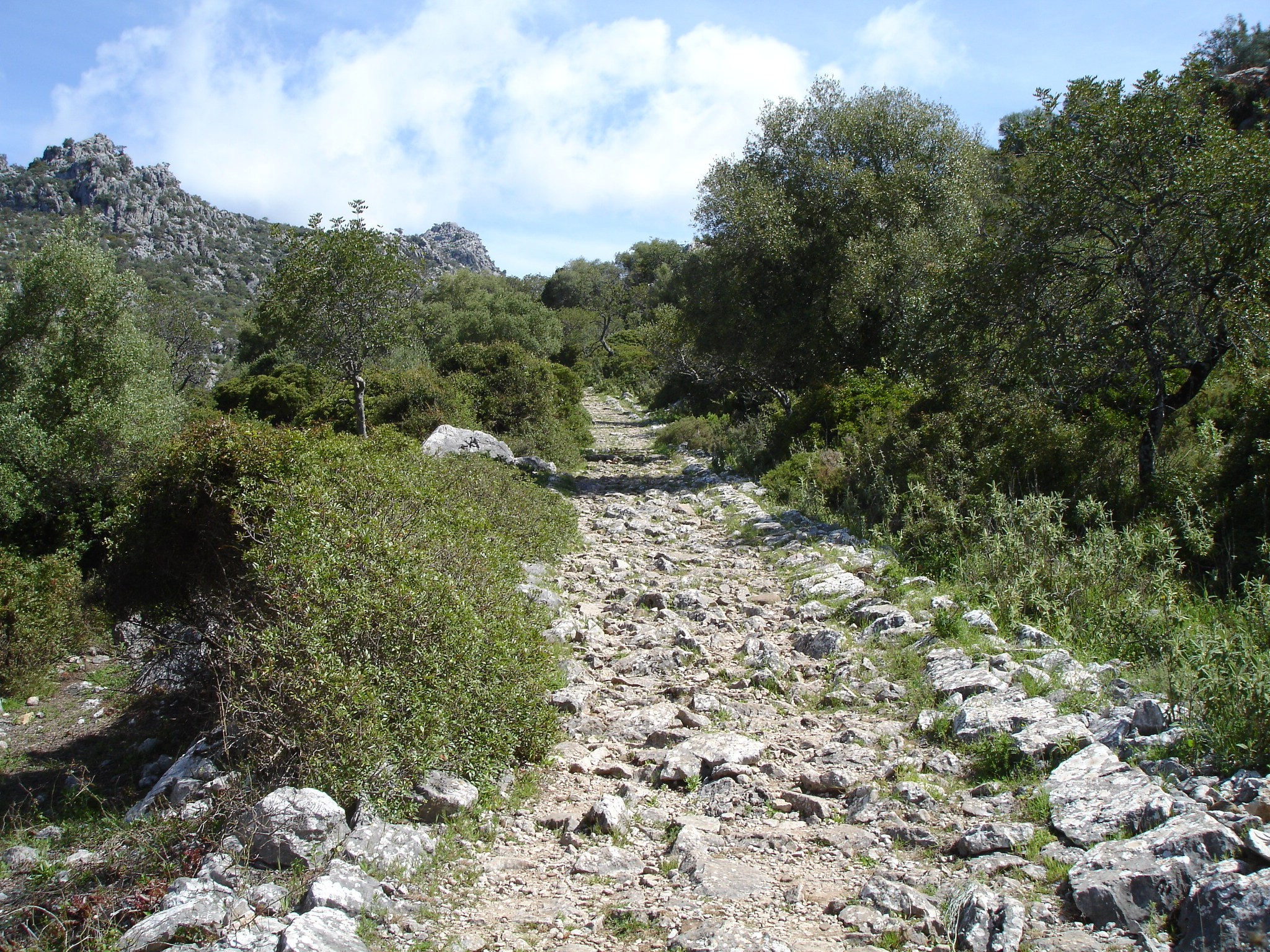
Roman road

== See also ==
- List of municipalities in Cádiz
