= Oak Street (Chicago) =

Street in Chicago, Illinois

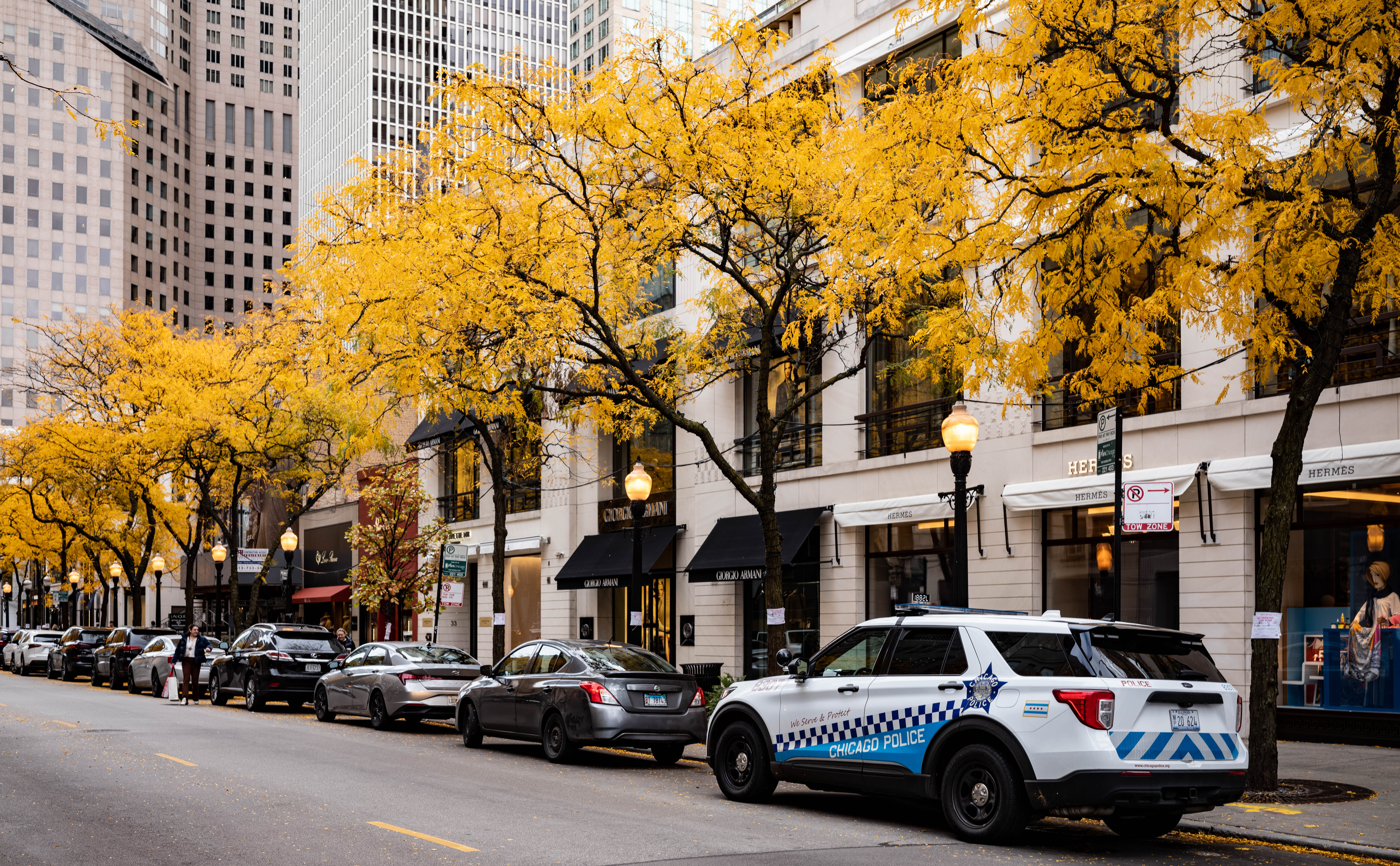
Oak Street, Rush Street and Walton Street contain virtually all of the luxury retail in Chicago

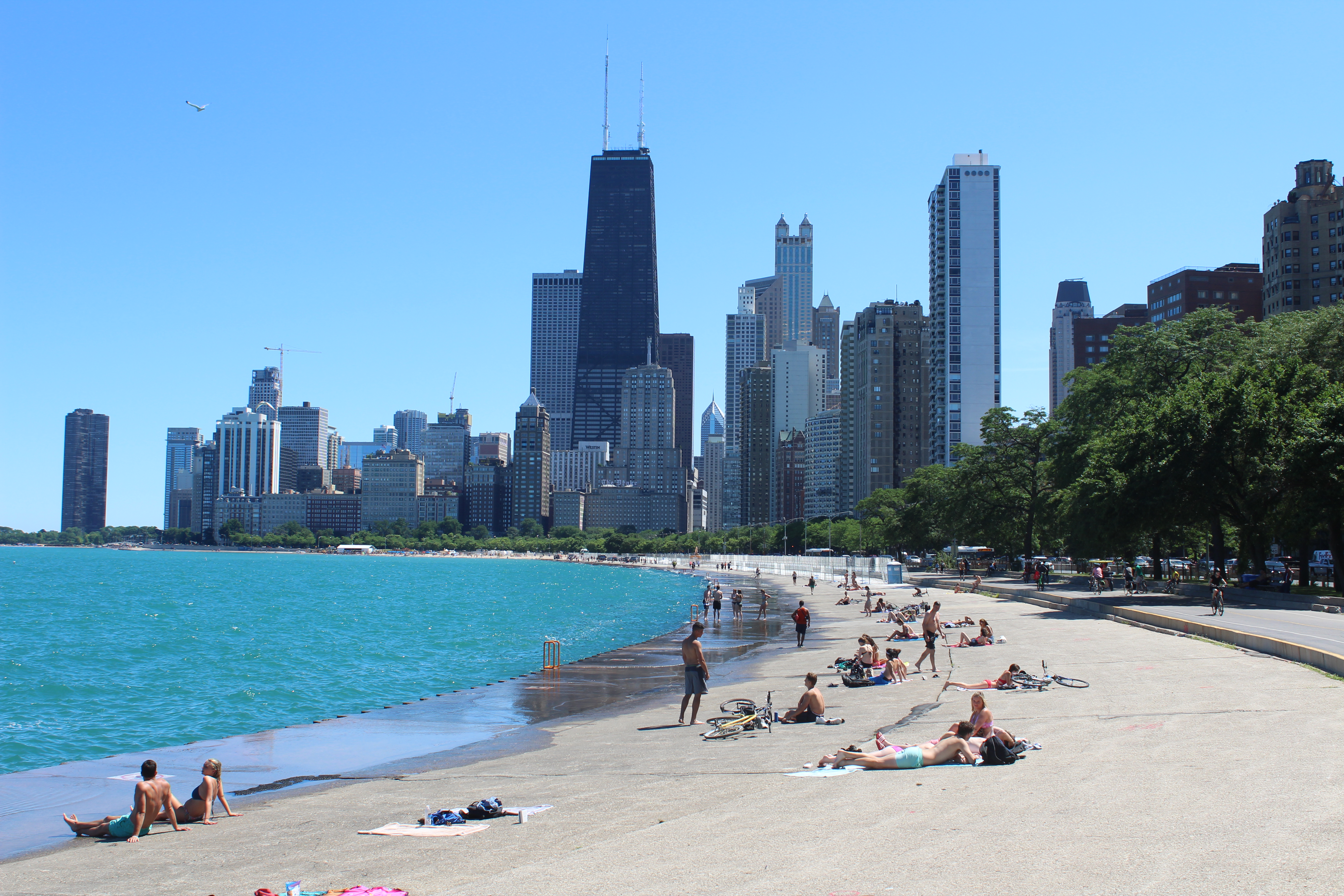
Oak Street Beach is an urban beach at the eastern end of Oak Street

Oak Street is a short, two-way street in Gold Coast, Chicago stretching from Michigan Avenue west to Goose Island. Its two blocks adjacent to Michigan Avenue contain a concentration of luxury shopping.

"Oak Street" also refers to the surrounding area including Rush Street and Walton Street as Chicago's luxury retail district.

== Location ==
Oak Street is in Chicago's Gold Coast. It runs from 138 East to 650 West in the Near North Side. It ends without crossing the North Branch of the Chicago River. West of the river, the street changes to Augusta Boulevard. Its eastern end is Michigan Avenue. At this intersection Oak Street becomes East Lake Shore Drive. Two blocks east of this end are famed North Lake Shore Drive, Lakefront Trail, and Oak Street Beach.

== Description ==
Oak Street is a luxury shopping street. Oak Street has a mix of international couture houses, American luxury brands, high fashion brands, and local boutiques. It intersects North Michigan Avenue at its east end. Oak Street contains more high end international brands than Michigan Avenue (the Magnificent Mile). Oak Street is much narrower, with trees lining both sides of the block giving a more quiet setting, with less foot traffic. Due to the short length of the street, luxury shops have opened on the parallel Walton Street and the intersecting Rush Street.

== Brands on Oak Street ==
Brands located on Oak Street between Michigan Avenue and State Street: Akris, Anne Fontaine, Bape, Bottega Veneta, Buccellati, Carolina Herrera, Cartier, Chanel, Christofle, Giorgio Armani, Christian Louboutin, COS, Eleventy, Golden Goose, Graff, Hermès, Harry Winston, ISAIA, Dolce & Gabbana, Lafayette 148, Lalique, Le Labo, LOEWE, Loro Piana, Sandro, Moncler, Panerai, Pomellato, Polène, Prada, Richard Mille, Tod's, Tom Ford, Van Cleef and Arpels, and Wolford.

=== Brands in the shopping district ===
Brands located nearby on Walton, Delaware, or Rush Street include: Alice + Olivia, Amiri, Arc'teryx, Brunello Cucinelli, Céline, Dior, Eskandar, Kith, lululemon, Oliver Peoples, Patagonia, rag & bone, The RealReal, Suitsupply, Saint Laurent, Warby Parker, Wilson Sporting Goods, Vera Wang, and Vuori.

== See also ==
- List of shopping streets and districts by city
- Rush Street
- Madison Avenue
