= Cortes de la Frontera =

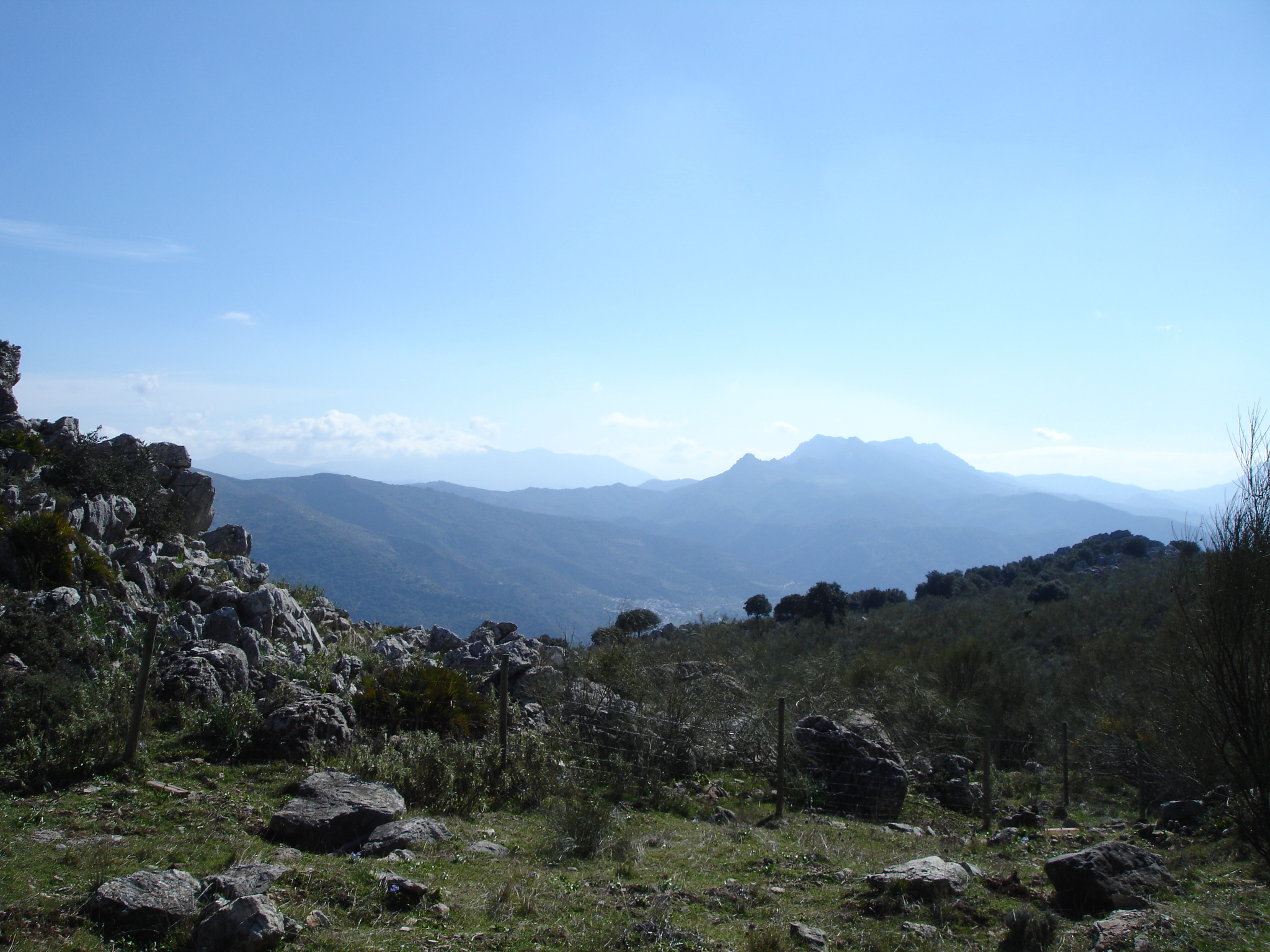

- Coat of arms

- Location in Spain.
- Coordinates: 36°45′N 5°34′W
- Sovereign state: Spain
- Autonomous community: Andalusia
- Province: Málaga

Area
  - Total: 175.87 km^{2} (67.90 sq mi)
- Elevation: 633 m (2,077 ft)

Population (2025-01-01)
  - Total: 3,048
  - Density: 17.33/km^{2} (44.89/sq mi)
- Time zone: UTC+1 (CET)
  - Summer (DST): UTC+2 (CEST)
- Website: www.cortesdelafrontera.es

Cortes de la Frontera is a town and municipality in the province of Málaga, part of the autonomous community of Andalusia in southern Spain. The municipality, stretching on a south-west/north-east axis, is situated approximately 40 km from Ronda, 20 km from Benaoján and 159 km from the provincial capital.

The village stands just short of 5 km outside the north-east limit of the Los Alcornocales Natural Park, and most of the municipality's territory is in that park. But the northern fringe of the municipality stretches into the Sierra de Grazalema Natural Park, including the southern part of the Sierra de los Pinos and its Pico del Pino (1,395 m altitude).

It has a population of approximately 4,000 residents. The natives are called Cortesanos.

La Sauceda is an abandoned village in the south-west extremity of the municipality. During the Civil War, the Franco troops stormed the place and executed a large part of the population that had taken refuge here. Recently, part of the village has been rebuilt as an environmental recreation centre and provides information services, accommodation and camping activities.
The La Sauceda trail, starting at the abandoned village of La Sauceda 24 km north-west of Jimena de la Frontera on the CA-8201 road to Puerto de Gáliz, leads to the peak of Aljibe (1,092 m), highest point of the Natural Park of Alcornocales. On the way, the path runs through an extensive and dense forest of cork oaks, up the Pasadallana Gorge. It is considered one of the most beautiful hiking trails in Spain, with views of Sierra de Grazalema, Gibraltar and North Africa beyong the strait.

The Cañón de las Buitreras, a natural monument dug by the Guadiaro river, is about 10 km north-east of El Colmenar.

== Gallery ==
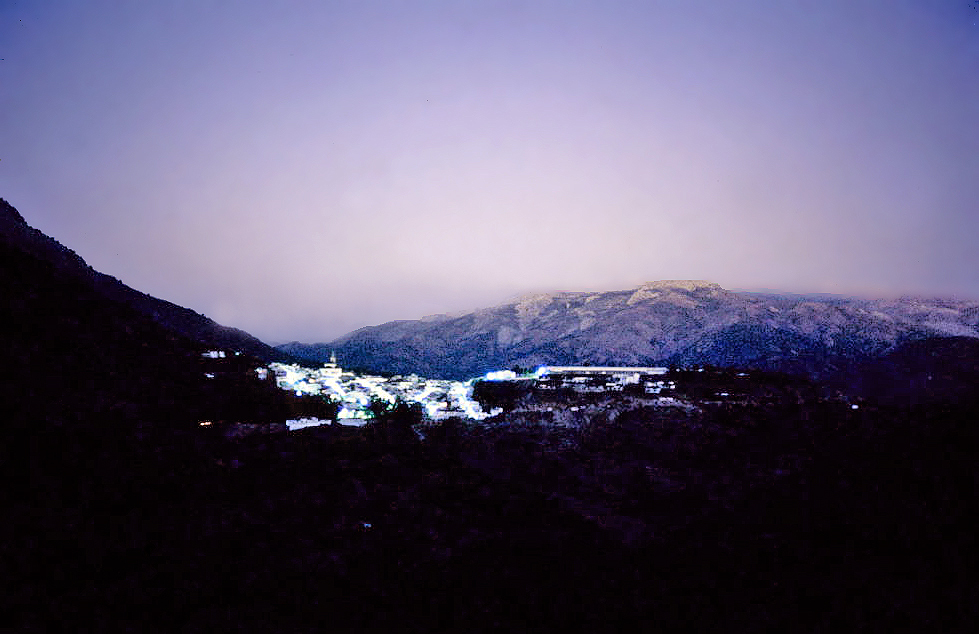
Cortes de la Frontera at dusk

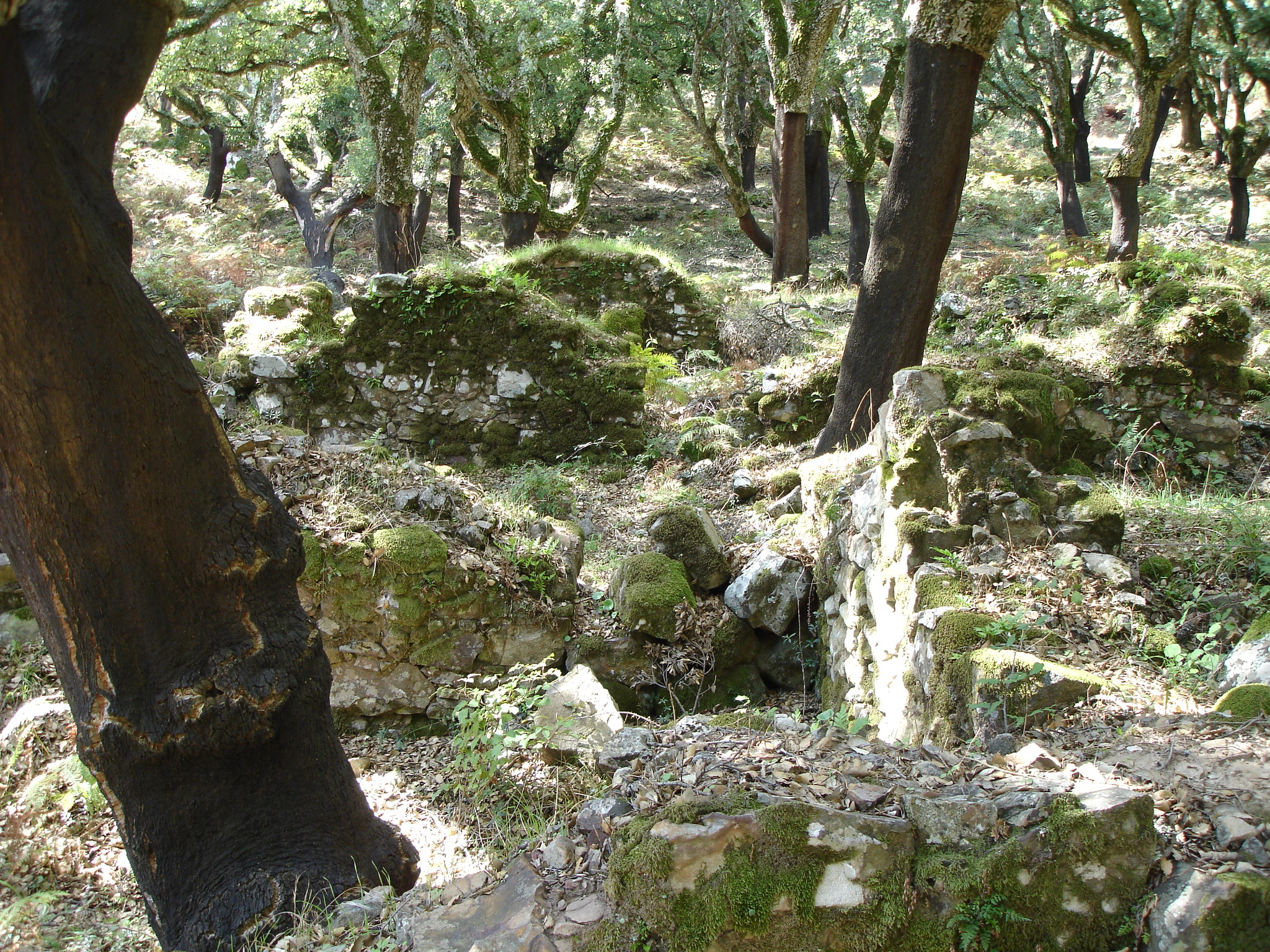
Roman ruins in the cork oak forest

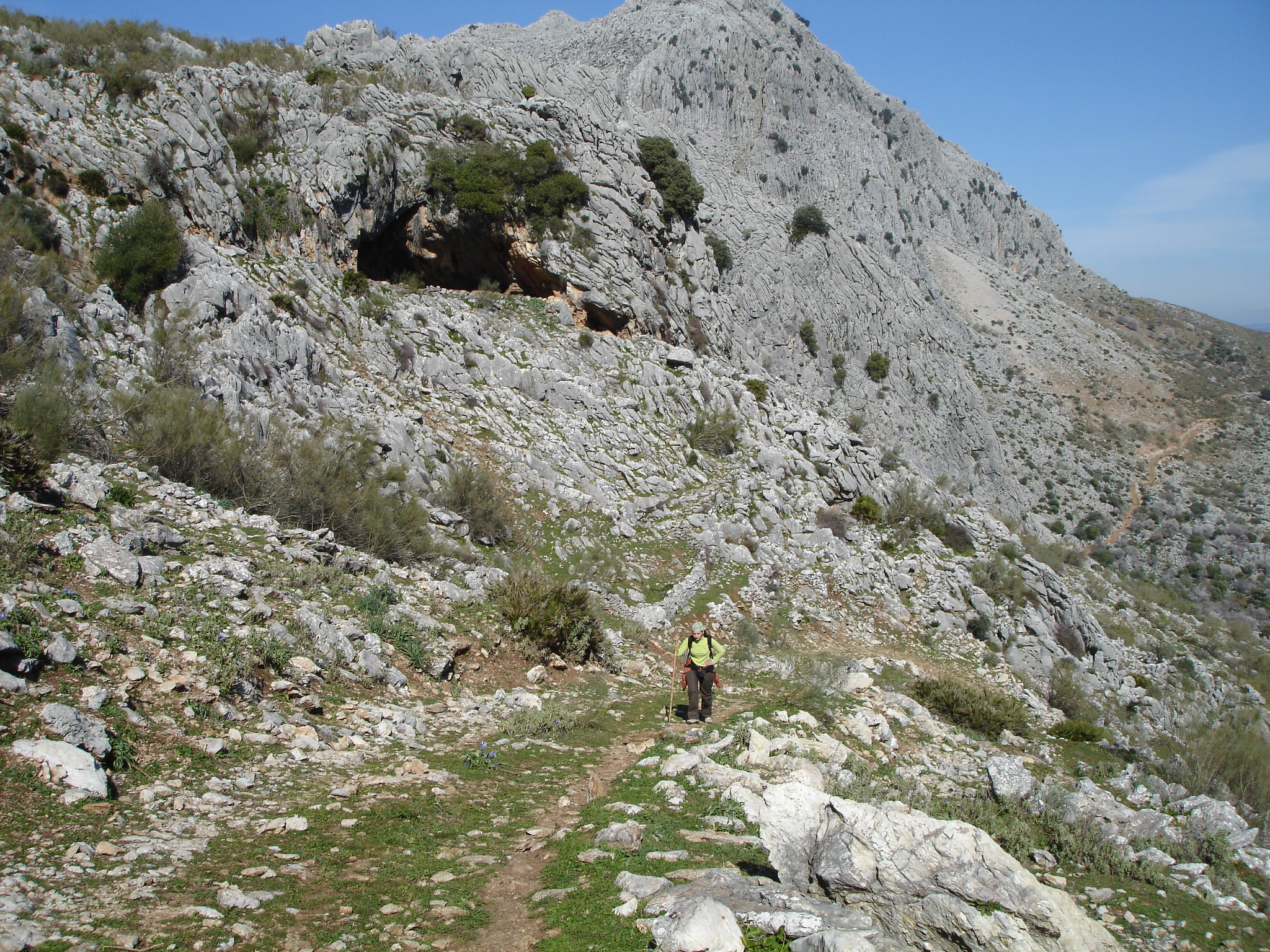
Hiking near Cortes de la Frontera

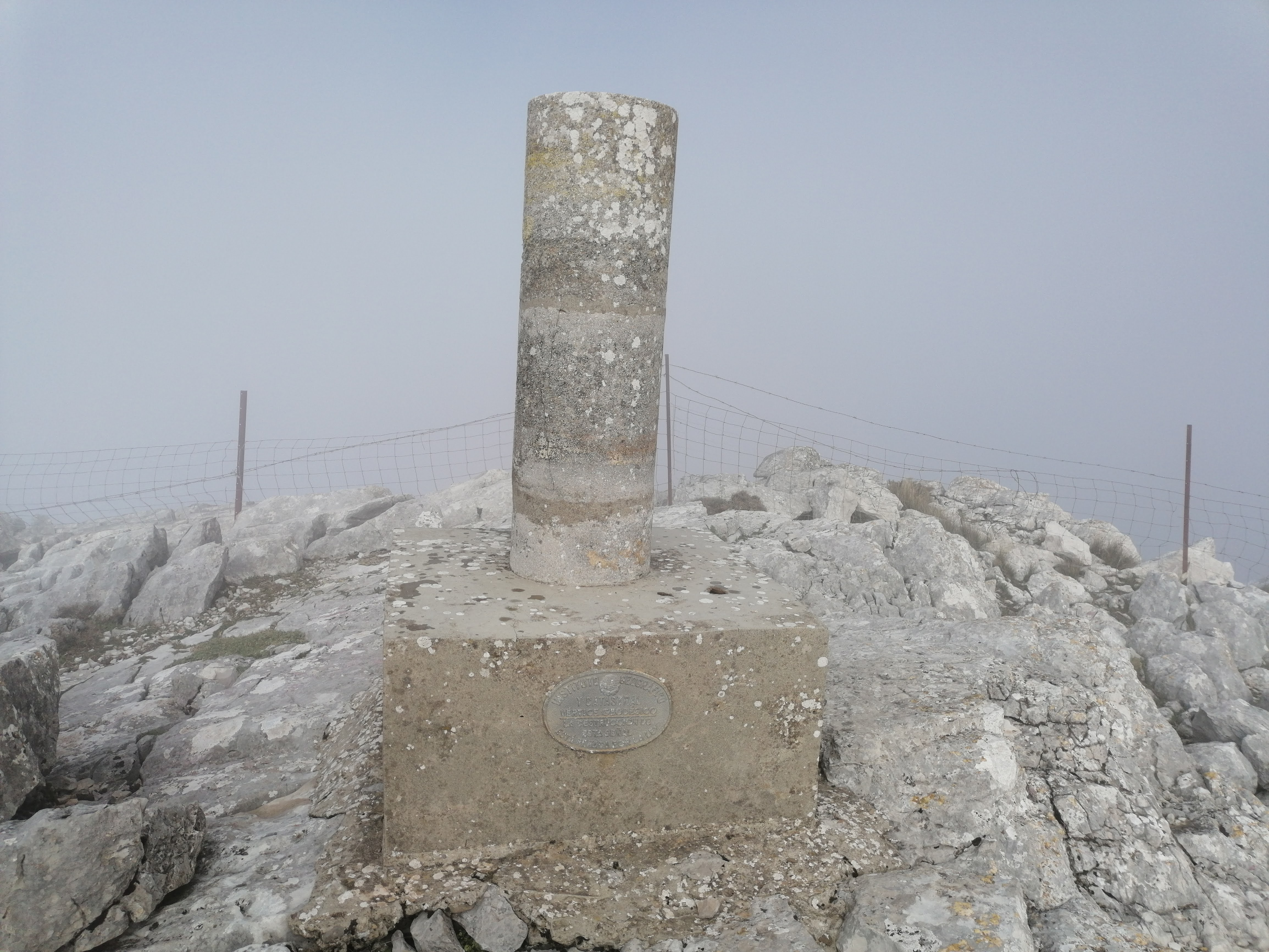
Geodesic vertex at the peak of Pico del Pino, in the Sierra de los Pinos

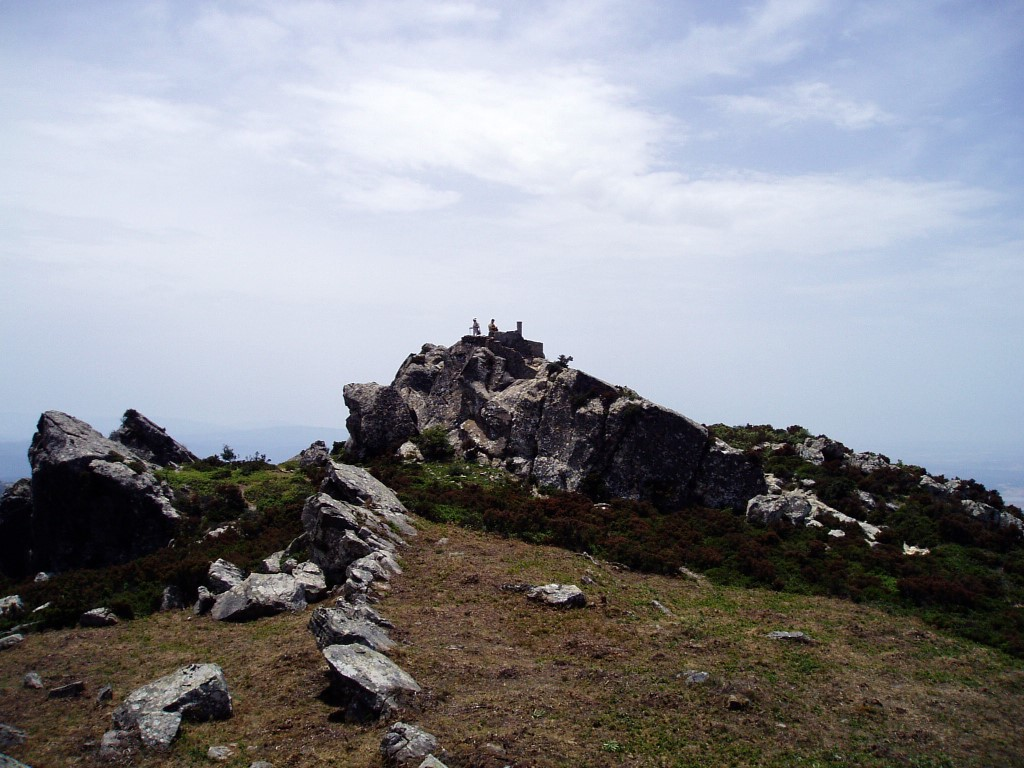
Pico del Aljibe

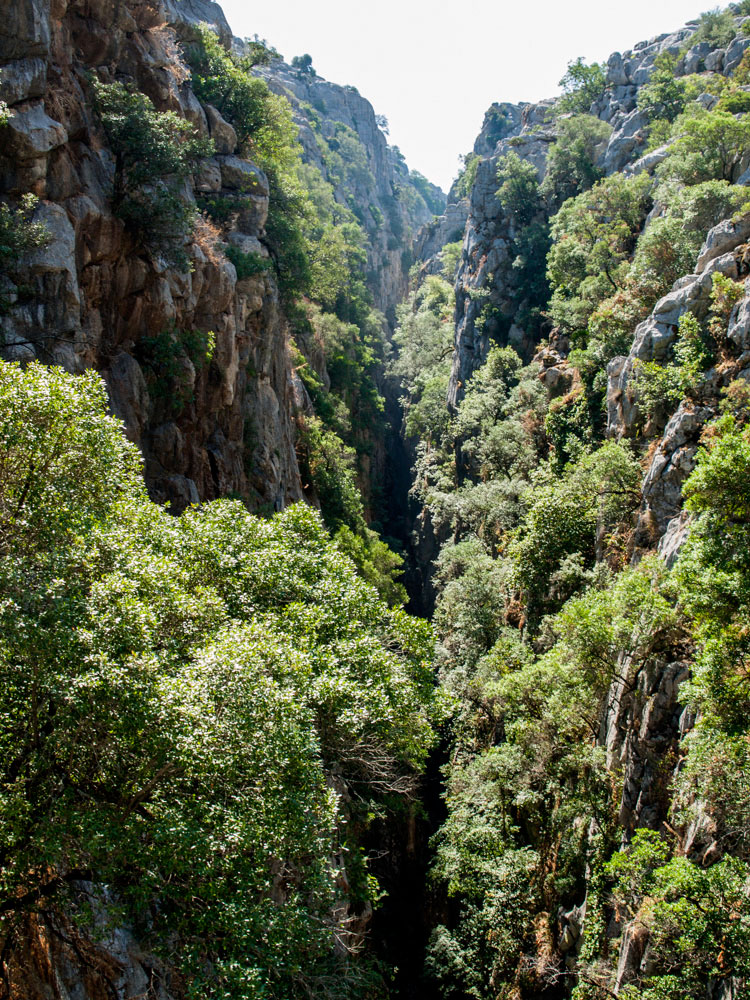
Cañón de las Buitreras

== See also ==
- List of municipalities in Málaga
