= Ubrique =

- Municipality
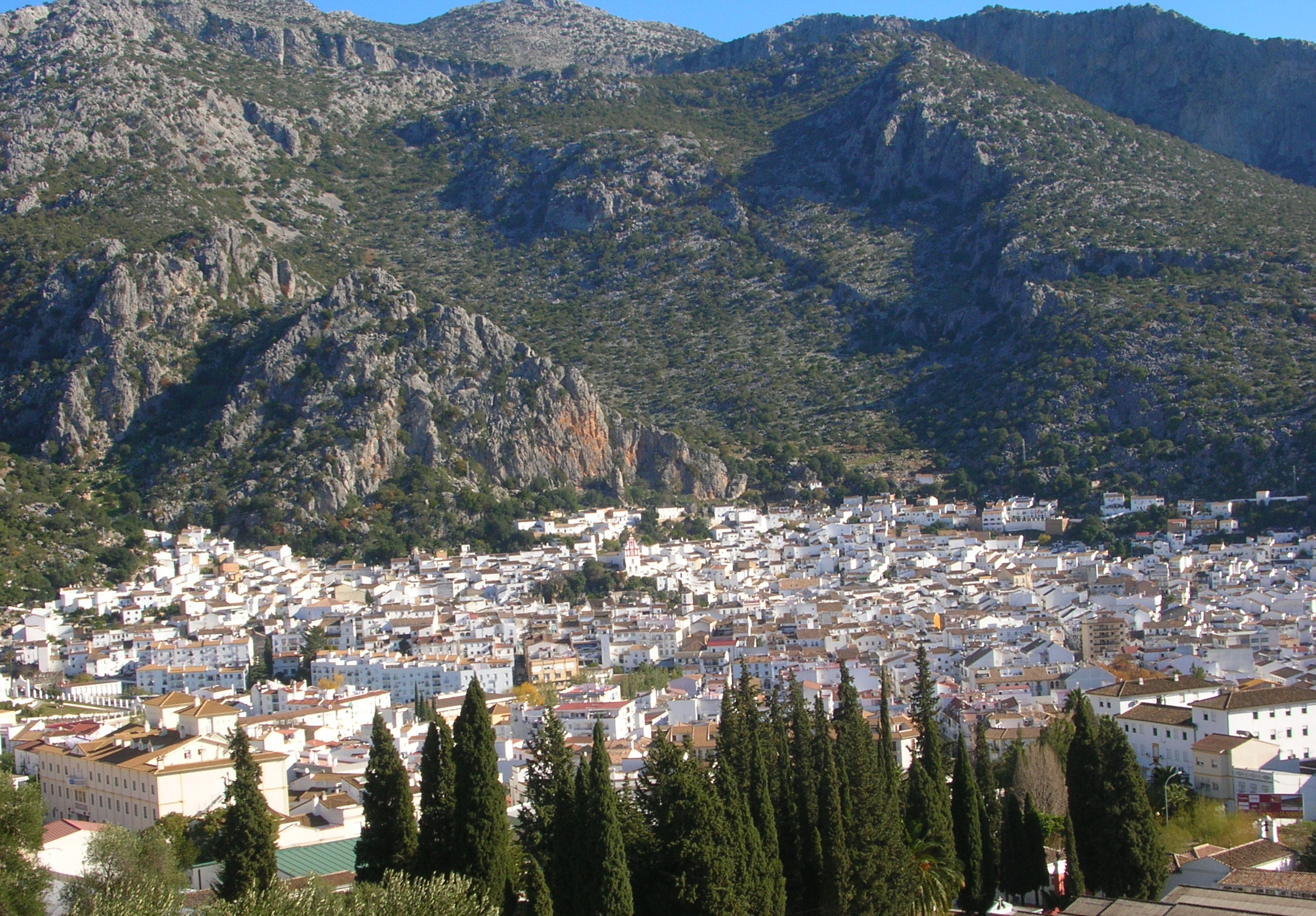

- Coat of arms

- Location within Spain Location within Province of Cádiz
- Coordinates: 36°41′N 5°27′W
- Country: Spain
- Region: Andalusia
- Province: Cádiz

Government
  - Mayor: Isabel Gómez García (PSOE)

Area
  - Total: 71 km^{2} (27 sq mi)

Population (2025-01-01)
  - Total: 16,615
  - Density: 230/km^{2} (610/sq mi)
- Time zone: UTC+1 (CET)
  - Summer (DST): UTC+2 (CEST)
- Website: ubrique.es

Ubrique is a municipality of Spain located in the province of Cádiz, in the autonomous community of Andalusia. According to the 2005 census, it has a population of 17,362 inhabitants. It is the most important municipality in the Sierra de Cádiz.

The most important industry is leather.

As part of the pueblos blancos (white towns) in southern Spain's Andalusia region, Ubrique reminds travellers of that area's Arab past.

== Geography ==
Ubrique is located between two Natural Parks: Grazalema and Los Alcornocales Los Alcornocales Natural Park. Thanks to its location, it is surrounded by a rocky landscape with a great diversity of flora (olive trees, carob trees, cork oaks, holm oaks, etc.) and abundant fauna (vultures, birds of prey, mountain goats, etc.) mainly on the highest mountainous areas located in the valley of the Aljibe. The Ubrique River divides the town in half, although it also has another river: Tavizna River.

== Demographics ==
Historical population
Year	Pop.	±%
1999	17,960	—
2000	17,586	−2.1%
2001	17,395	−1.1%
2002	17,534	+0.8%
2003	17,478	−0.3%
2004	17,404	−0.4%
2005	17,362	−0.2%
Source: INE (Spain)

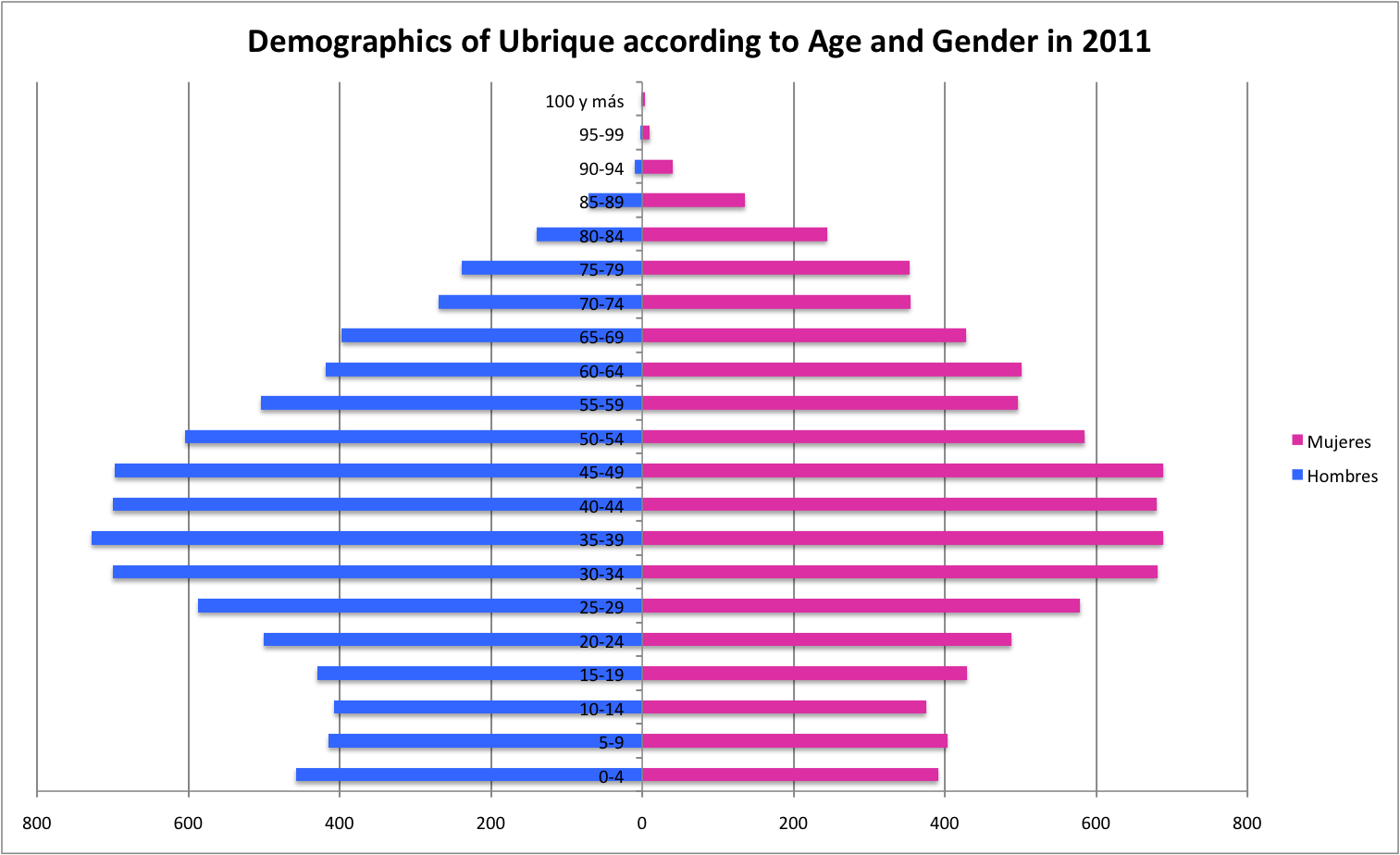
Composition of population (Ubrique) INE (Spain)

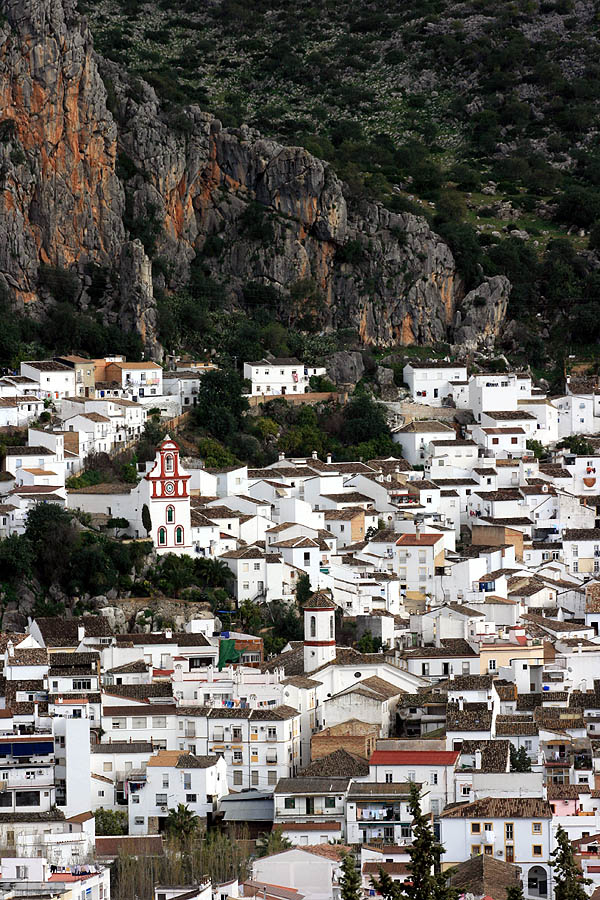
Ubrique at the foot of Sierra Ubrique.

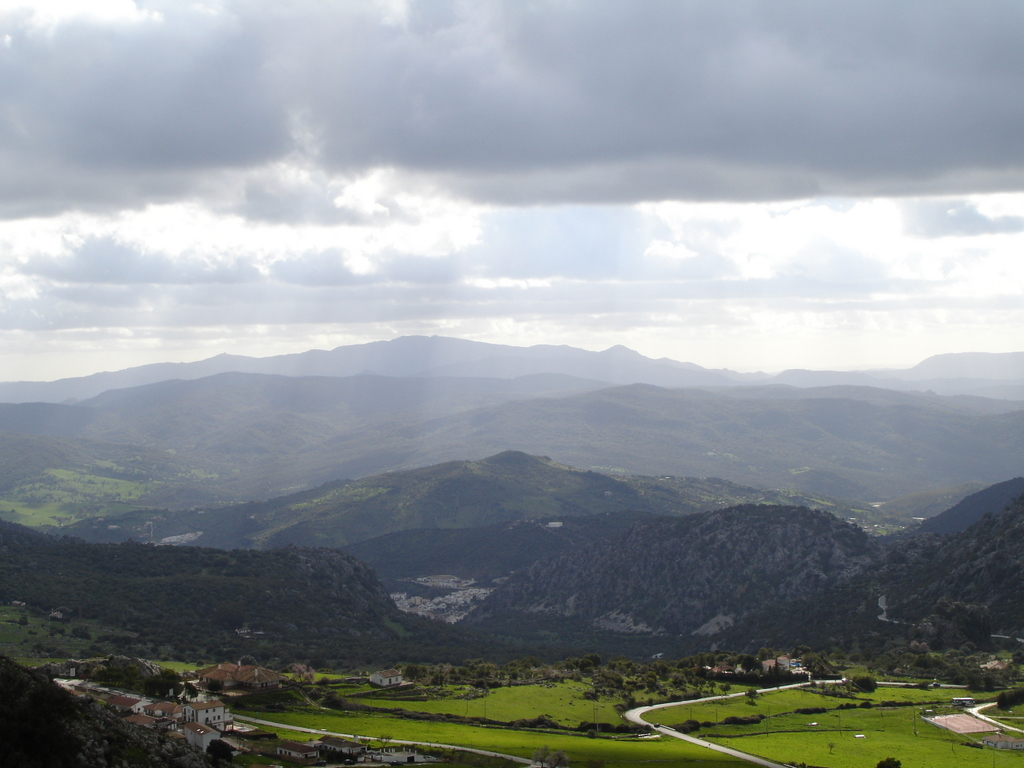
Ubrique from Benaocaz

== Economy ==
The area is known for leather goods. The handbags and other leather products of French luxury brand Polène are all made in Ubrique.

== See also ==
- List of municipalities in Cádiz
