= Sierra de Grazalema Natural Park =

Natural park in southern Spain

Coordinates: 36.769°N 5.431°W

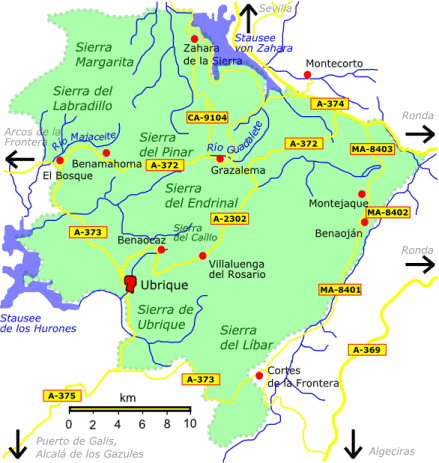
Location of the Natural Park

The Sierra de Grazalema Natural Park (Spanish: Parque natural de la Sierra de Grazalema) is a natural park in the northeastern part of the province of Cádiz in southern Spain. The park encompasses, within its 51,695 hectares (127,740 acres), a complex of mountain ranges, known collectively as the Sierra de Grazalema, which, in turn, are part of the Cordillera Subbética. Other ranges within the park, comprising the Sierra de Grazalema, include the Sierra de Zafalgar, the Sierra del Pinar, and the Sierra de Endrinal. Pinar (or Torreón), 1,654 metres (5,427 ft) in elevation, is the tallest peak.

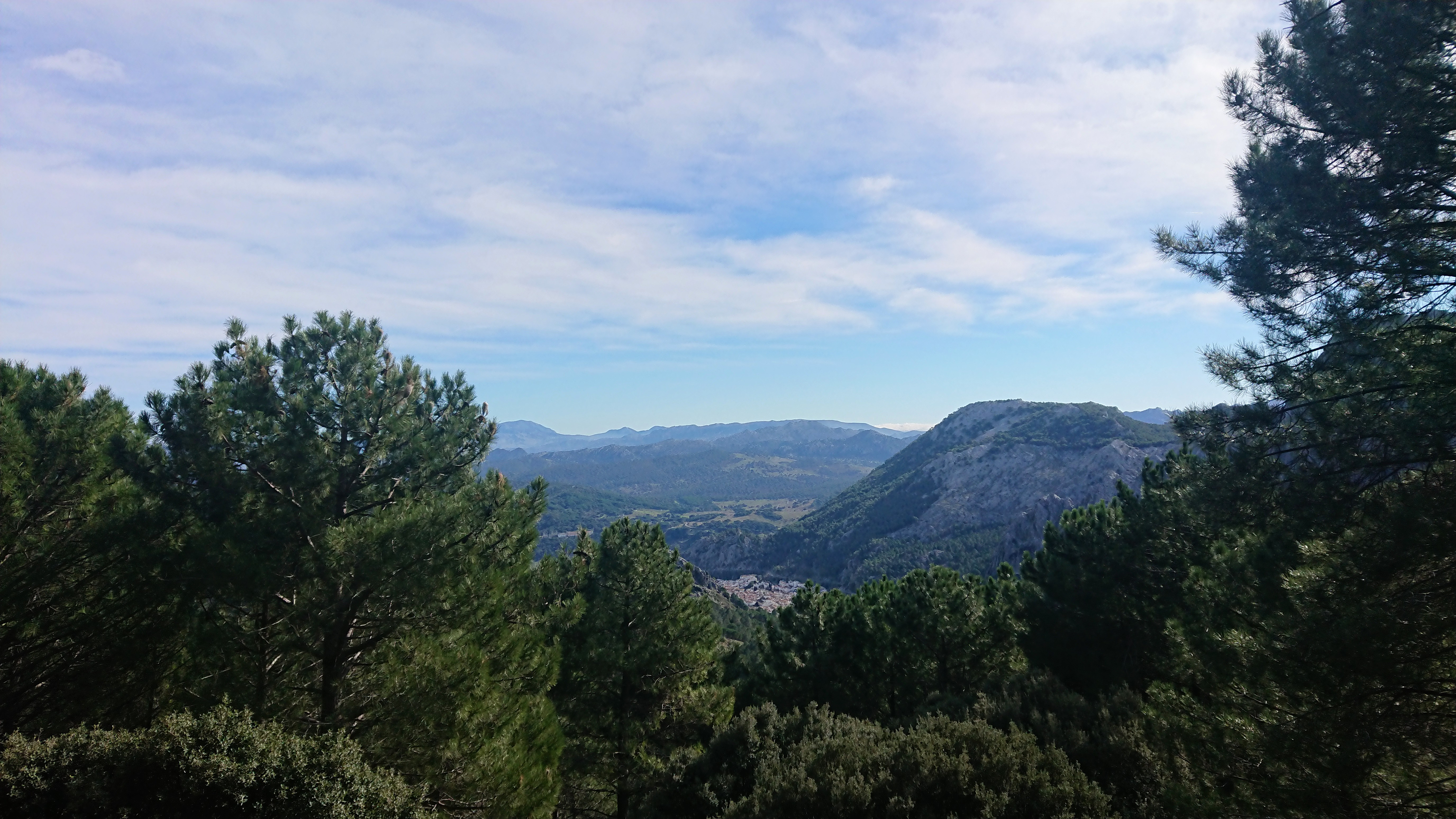
Grazalema

The Sierra de Grazalema, a karstic region, contains a number of large limestone caverns, including the Cueva del Gato, the Cueva de la Pileta and the Garganta Verde. The Sierra de Grazalema is also home to many colonies of vultures, including a few pairs of Egyptian vultures, a species which is seriously threatened. The natural park was declared a biosphere reserve in 1977.

== El Pinsapar Forest ==
"El Pinsapar" is a notable forest located within the Sierra de Grazalema Natural Park in the province of Cádiz, Andalusia, southern Spain. It is distinguished for its status as one of the last remaining habitats of the Spanish Fir (Abies pinsapo), a rare and endangered conifer species endemic to the Iberian Peninsula and northern Morocco. Characterized by dense stands of Spanish Fir trees, El Pinsapar forms an integral component of the park's diverse ecosystem. This ancient woodland provides critical habitat for a variety of plant and animal species adapted to the montane environment of the Sierra de Grazalema. Visitors to El Pinsapar can explore designated trails, experiencing the unique beauty and biodiversity of this remarkable forest.

== Towns and cities within the park ==
All or part of nine municipalities of the province of Cádiz lie within the Natural Park of Grazalema: Algodonales, Benaocaz, El Bosque, El Gastor, Grazalema, Prado del Rey, Ubrique, Villaluenga del Rosario, and Zahara de la Sierra. Likewise, there are five towns in Málaga province that have land within park boundaries: Benaoján, Cortes de la Frontera, Jimera de Líbar, Montejaque, and Ronda.

== Gallery ==
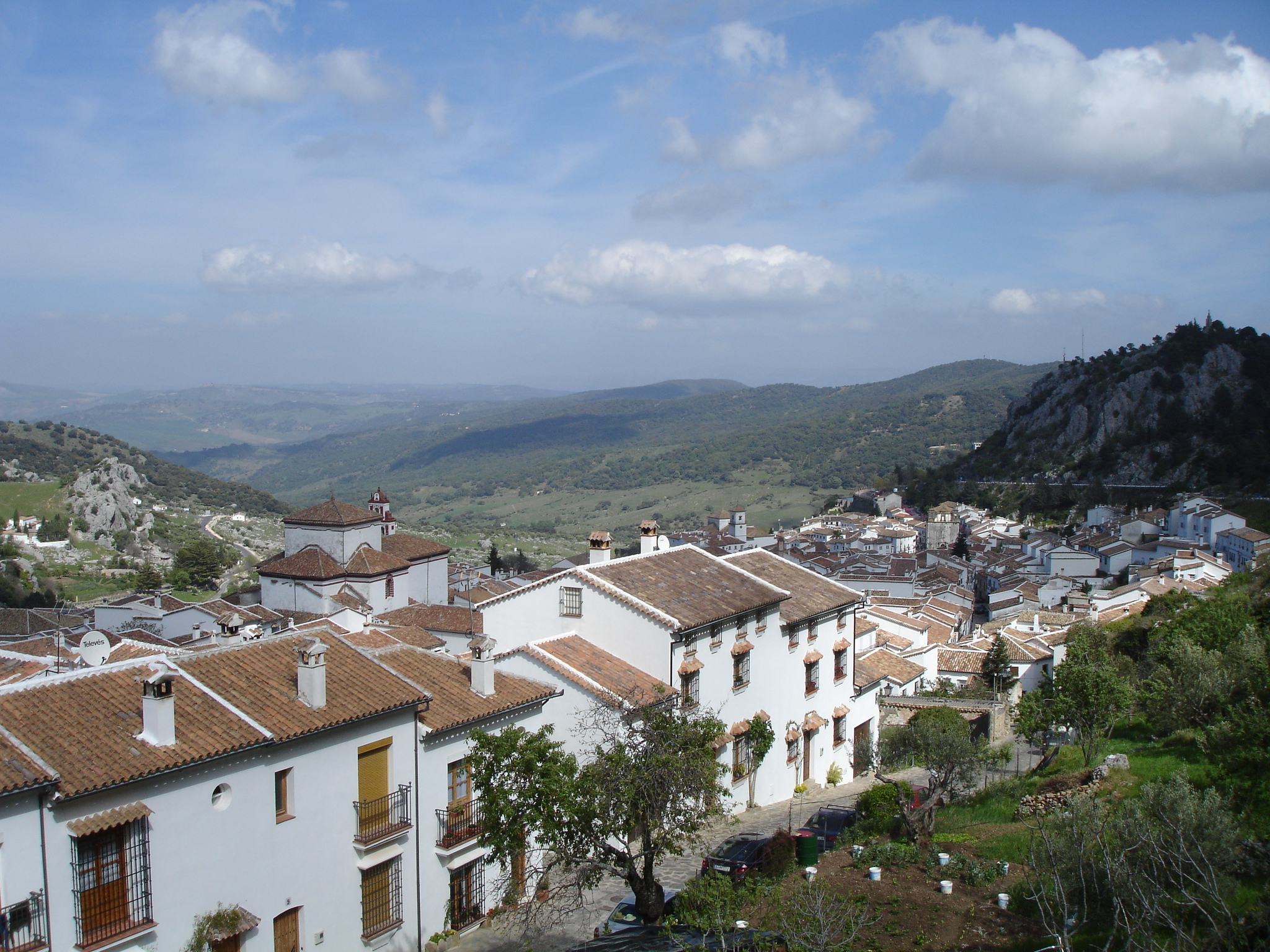
Town of Grazalema

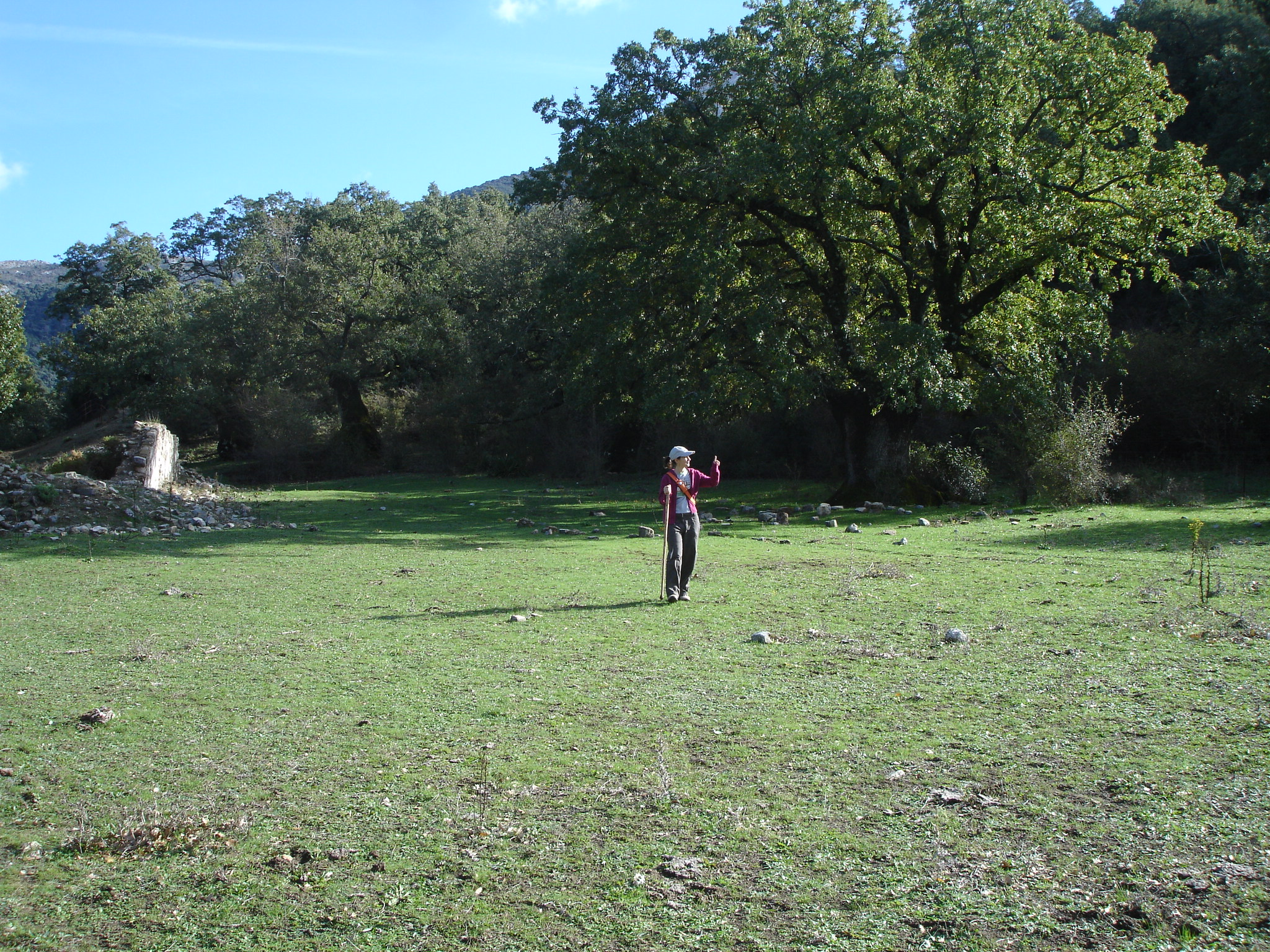
Llanos del Ravel or Llanos del revés

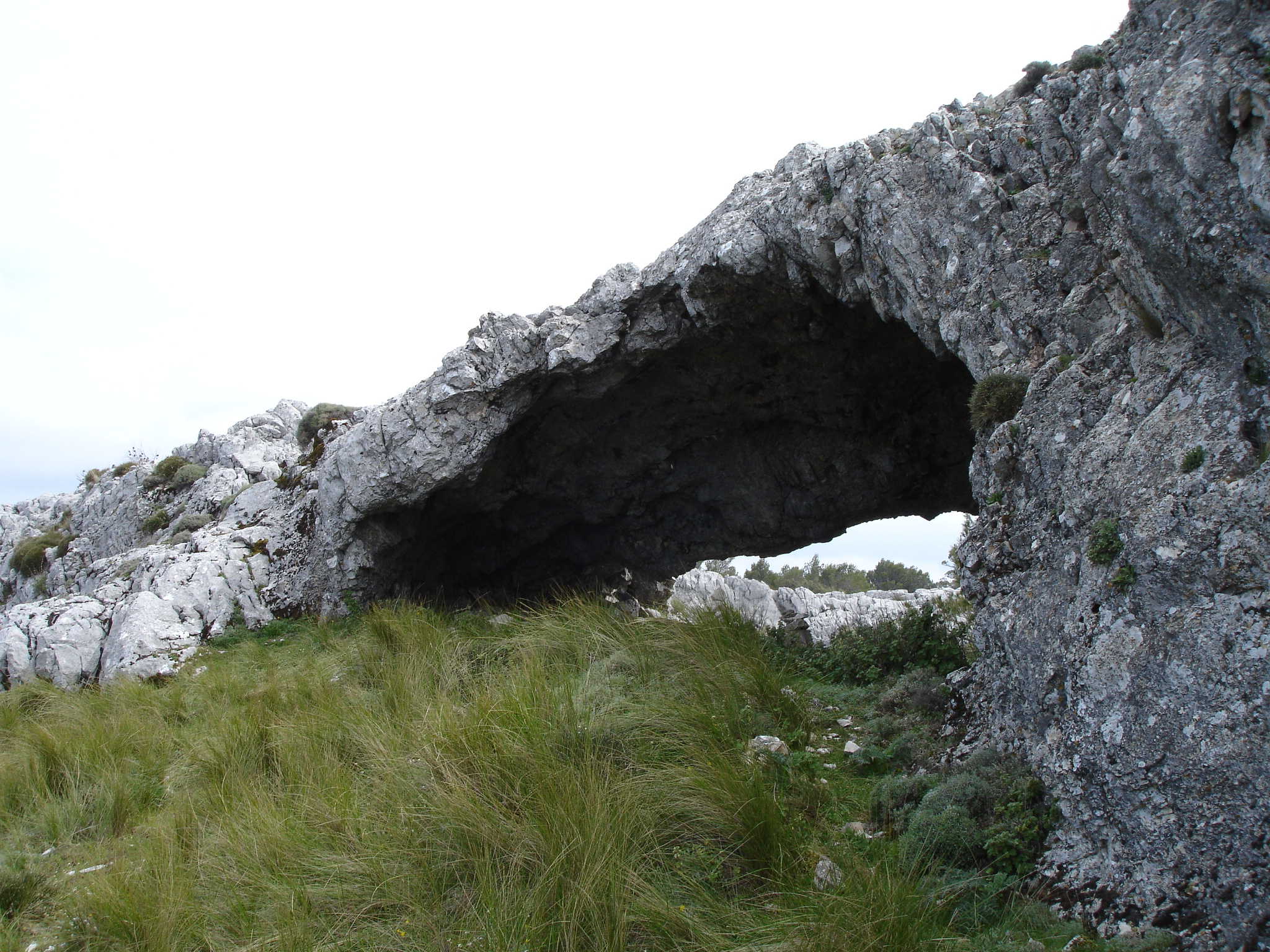
Cueva de las Dos Puertas

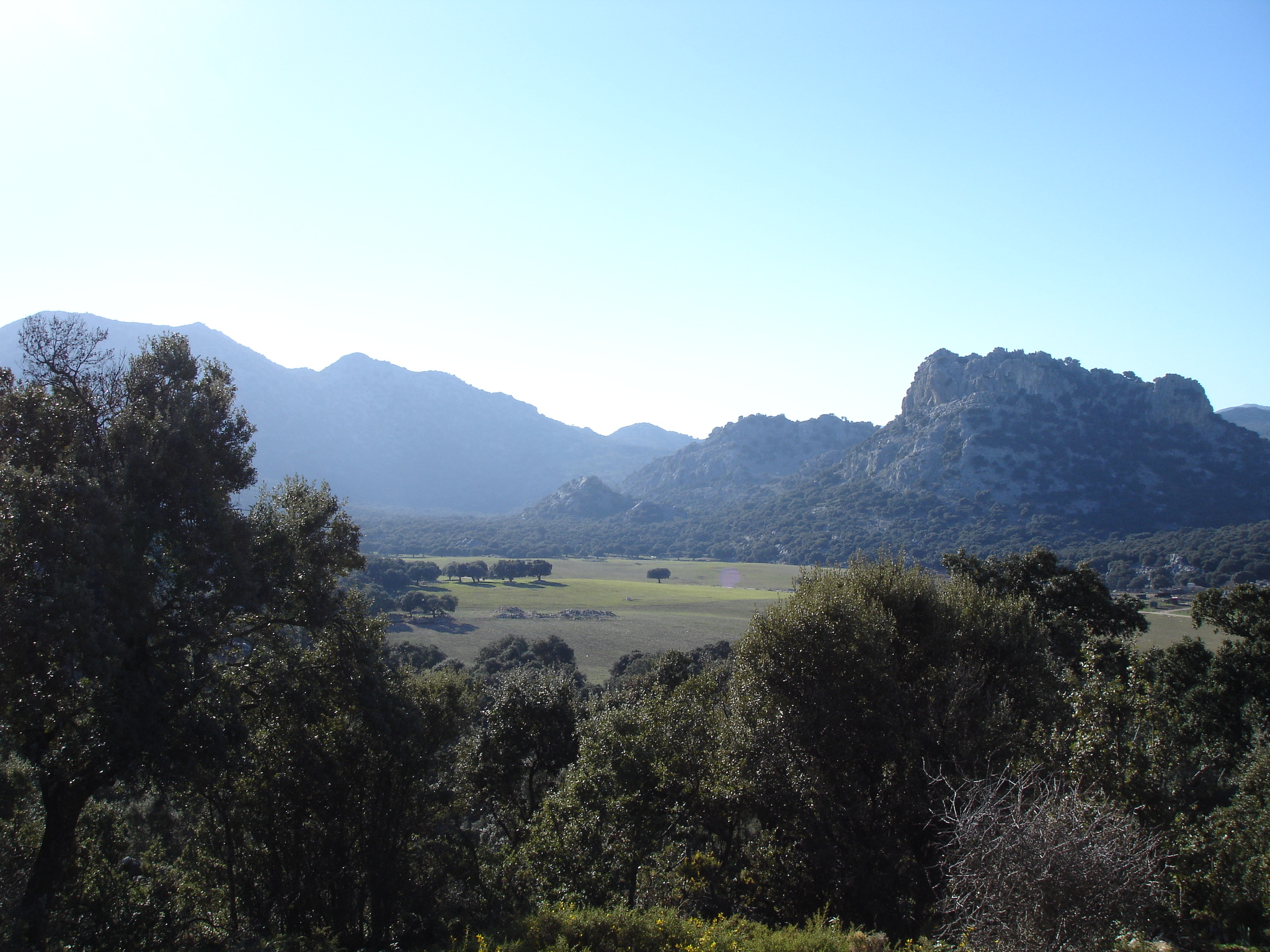
Llanos de Líbar

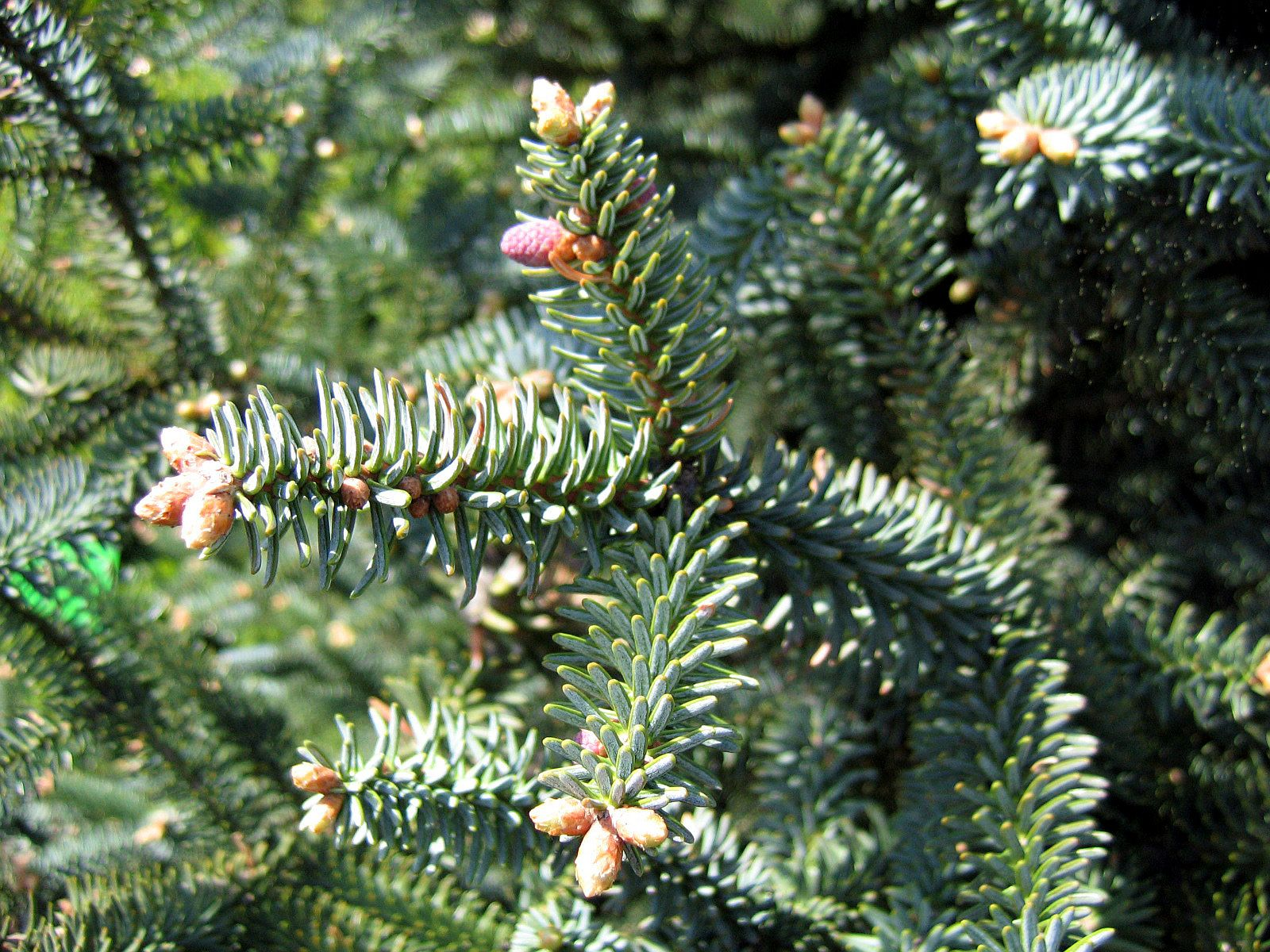
Abies pinsapo

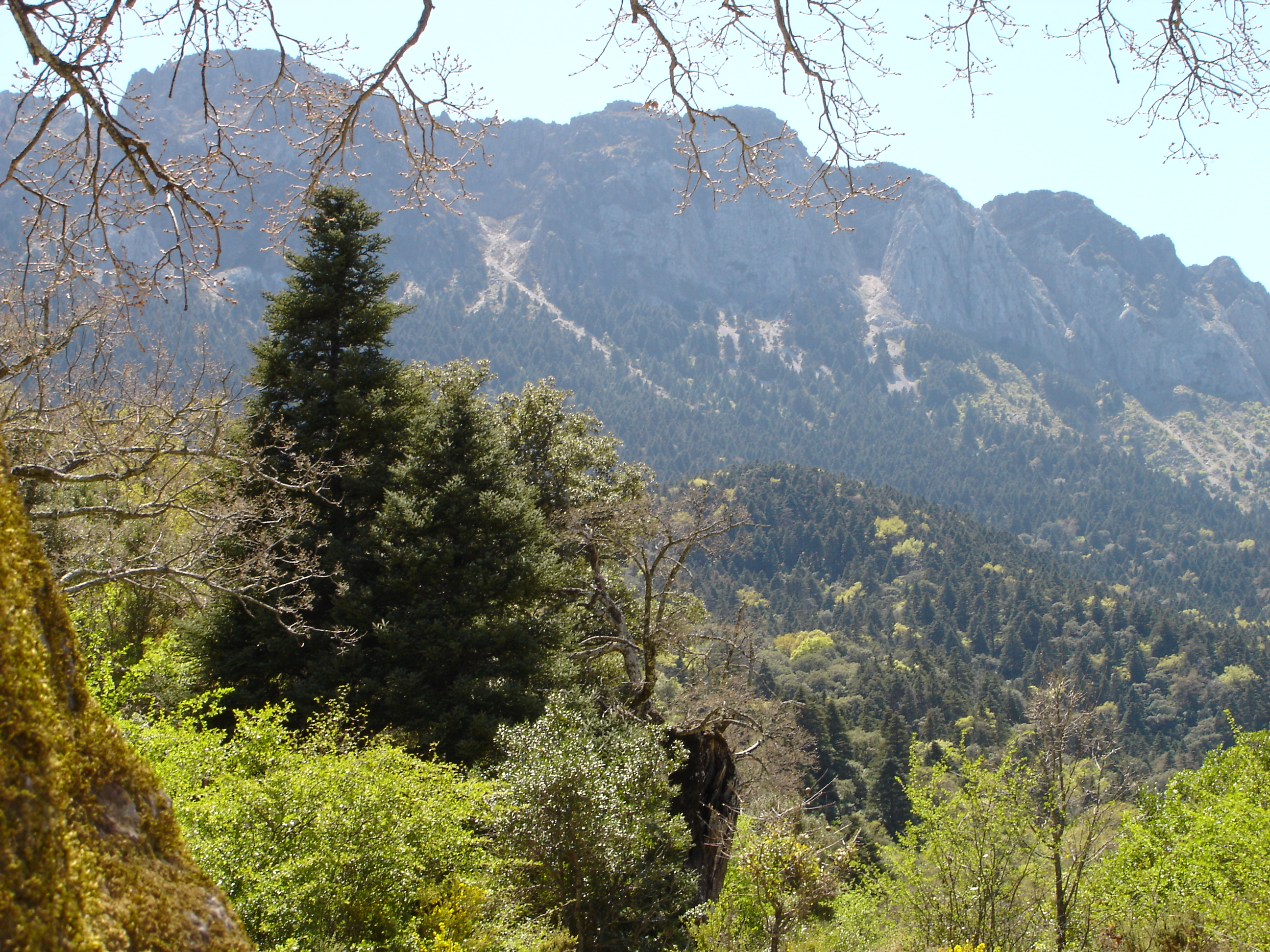
Pinsapar from Llanos del Ravel

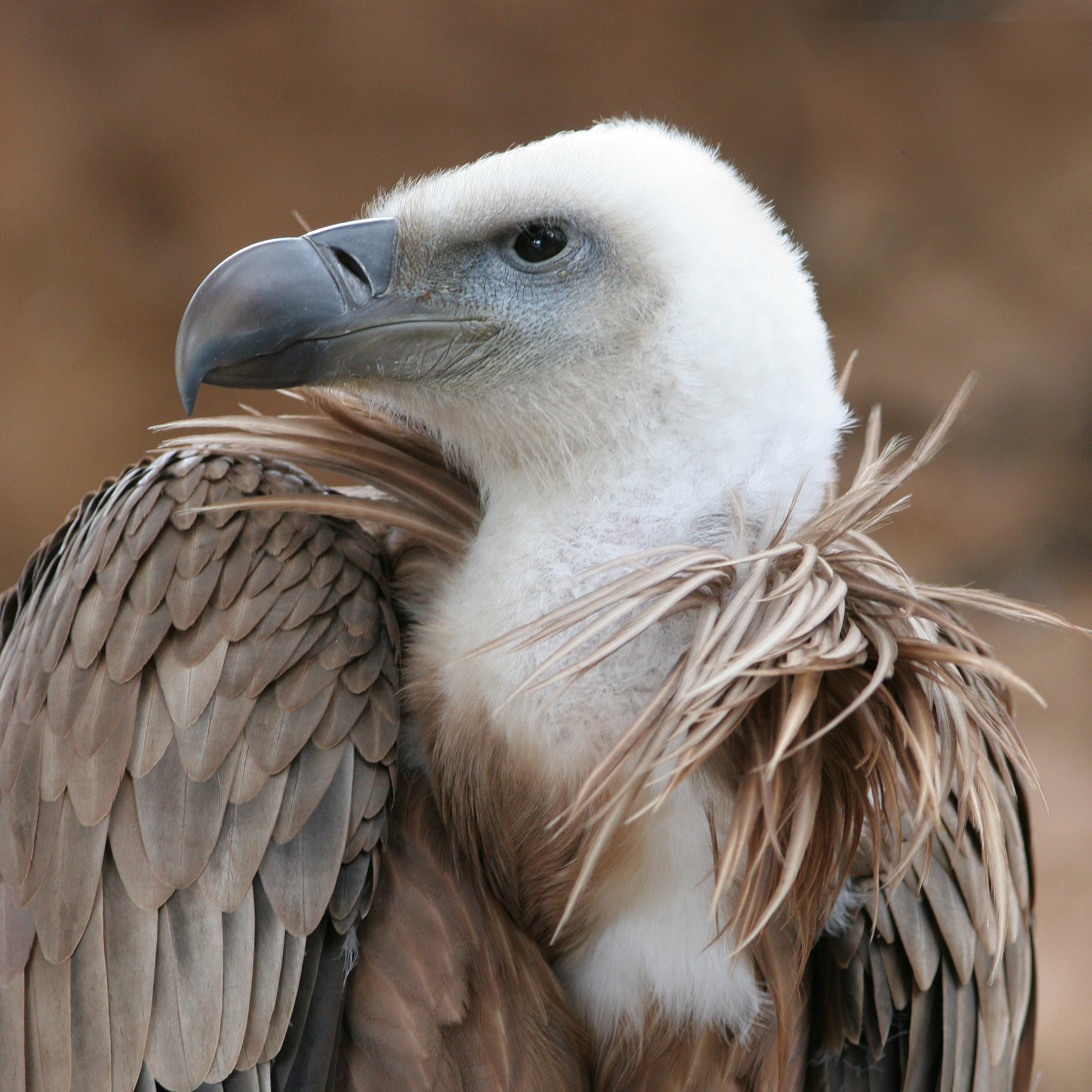
Gyps fulvus

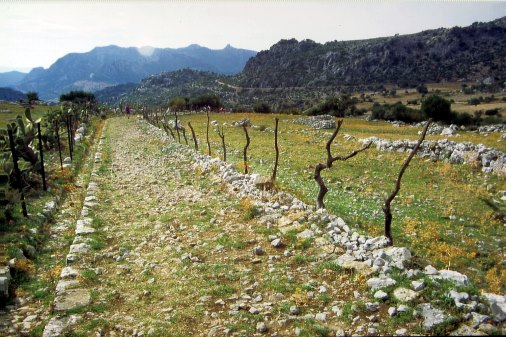
Calzada romana

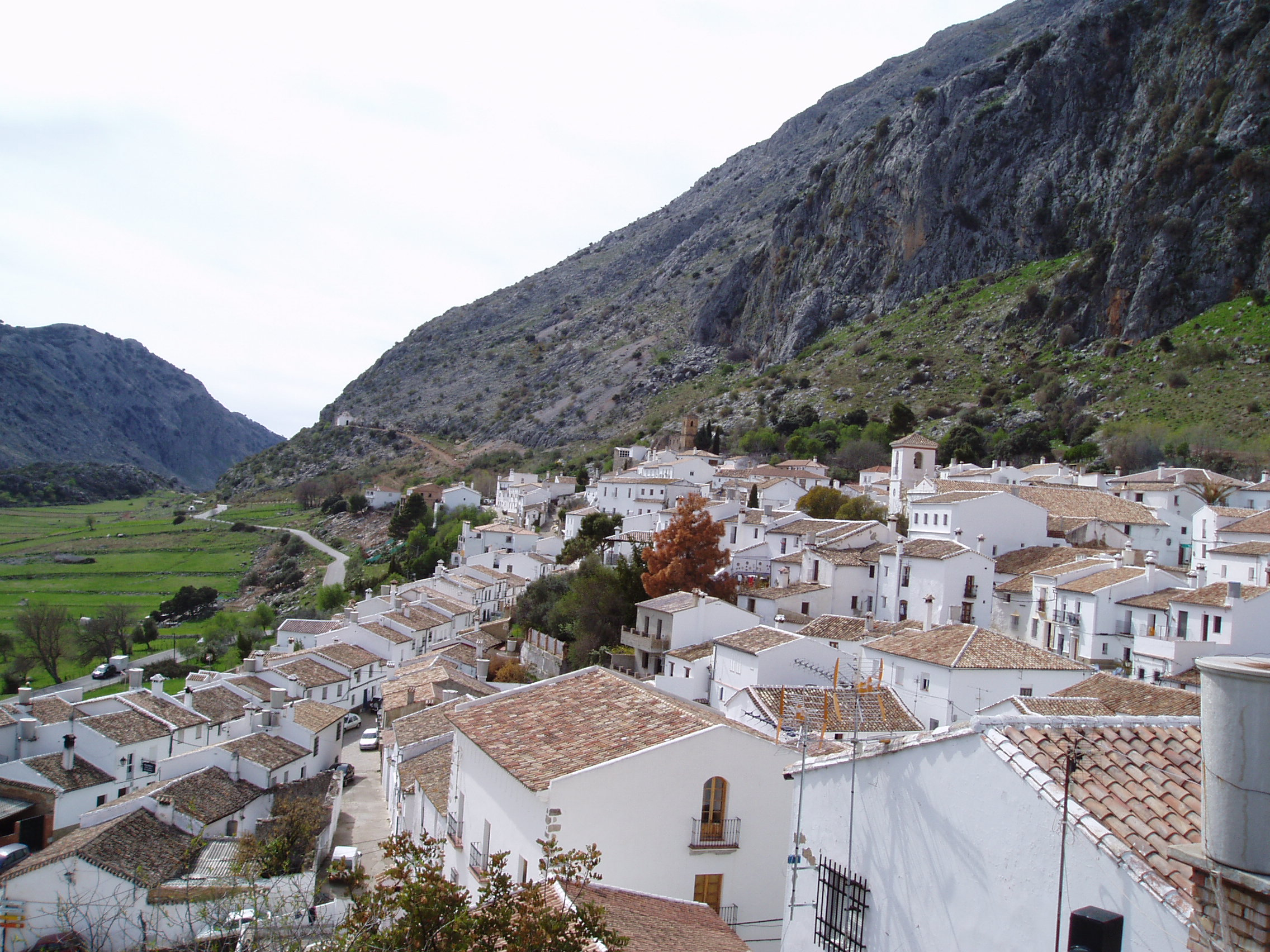
Villaluenga del Rosario

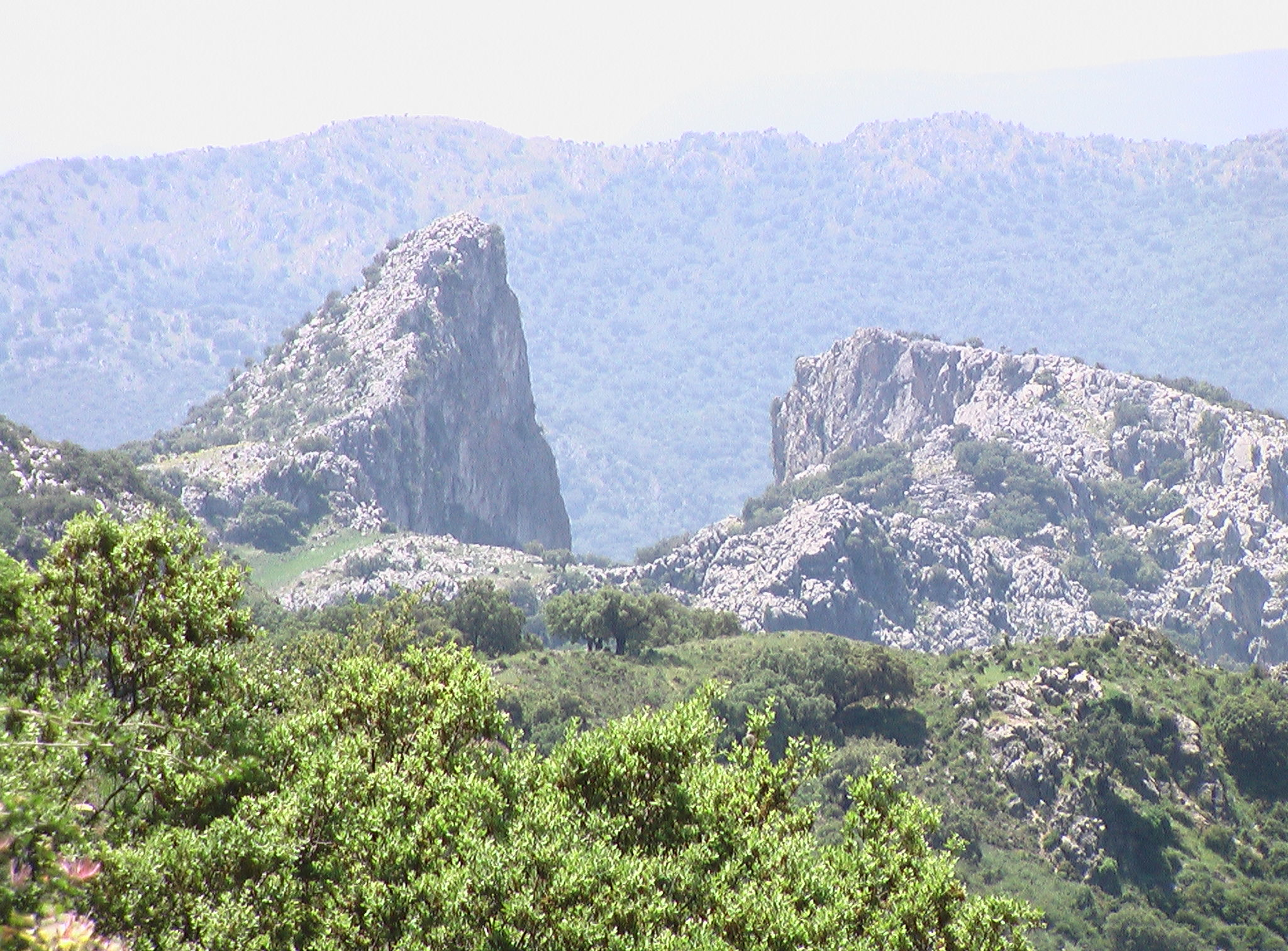
Salto del Cabrero

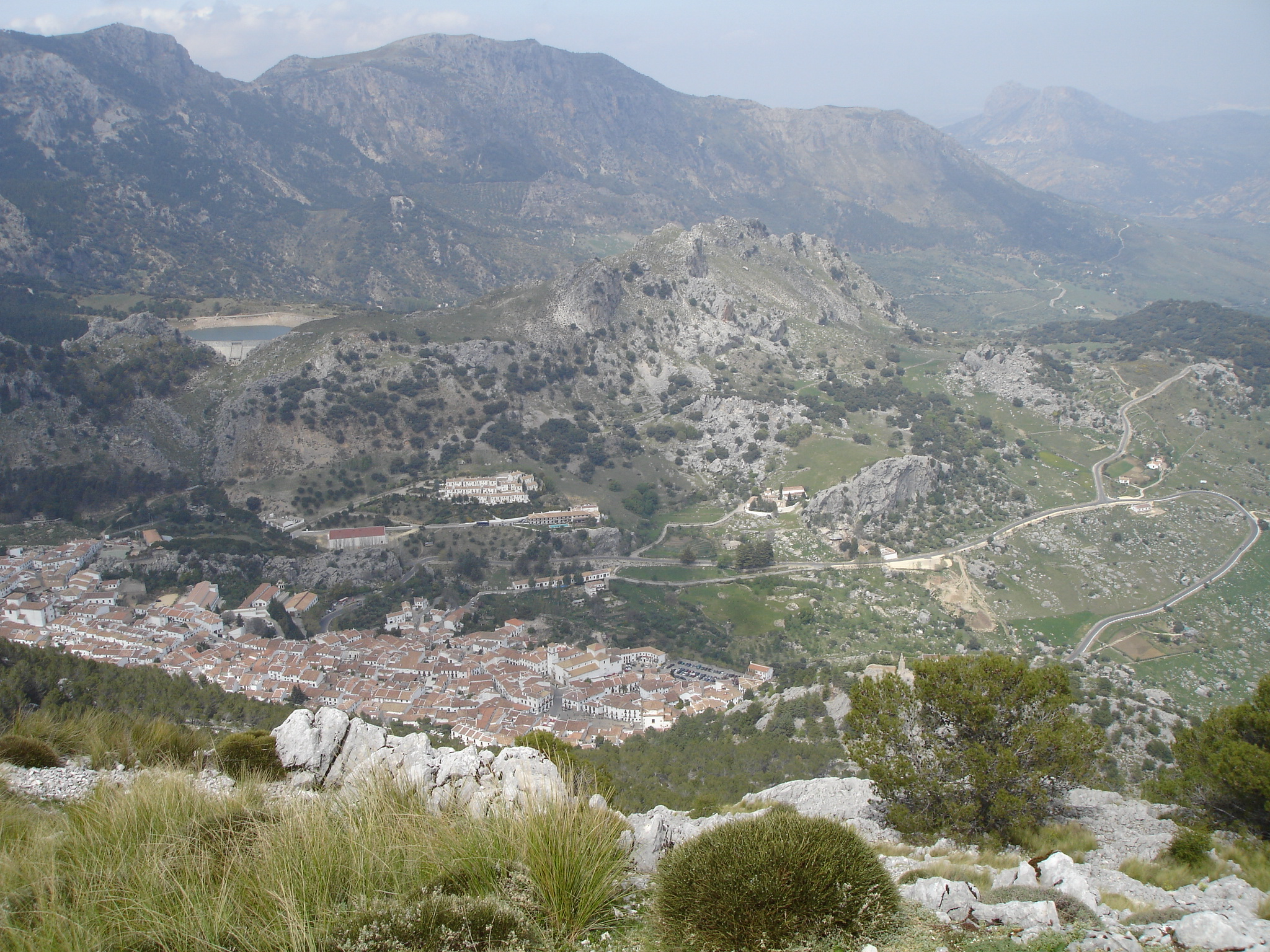
Grazalema from Endrinal mountains

== See also ==
- List of Sites of Community Importance in Andalusia
