= José Mazuelos Pérez =

Spanish Roman Catholic bishop

His Most Reverend José Mazuelos Pérez
- Bishop of Canarias
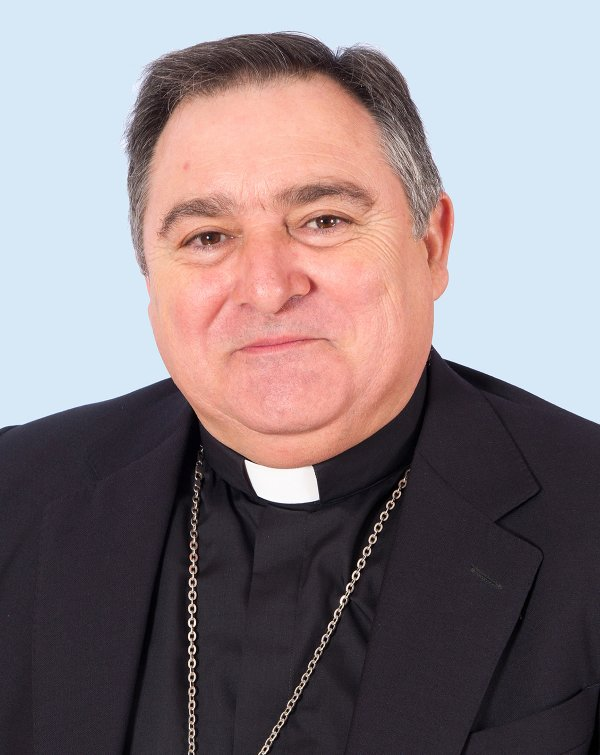
- Archdiocese: Seville
- Diocese: Canarias
- Predecessor: Francisco Cases Andreu

Orders
- Ordination: 17 March 1990
- Consecration: 16 June 2009 by Carlos Amigo Vallejo

Personal details
- Born: 9 October 1960 (age 65) Seville, Spain
- Denomination: Roman Catholic
- Motto: Redemptor hominis Iesus Christus
- Coat of arms

José Mazuelos Pérez (born 9 October 1960). is a Spanish prelate of the Catholic Church, currently bishop of the diocese of Canarias (part of the Canary Islands) and previously he served as bishop of the diocese of Jerez de la Frontera.

== Biography ==
After completing medical studies in 1983, he worked as a doctor in Osuna at the San Carlos de San Fernando Military Hospital in Cádiz. In 1985 he began his ecclesiastical studies at the Seminary of Seville. He was ordained a priest on 17 March 1990. He studied in Rome obtaining a degree (1995) and a doctorate (1998) in Moral Theology at the Pontifical Lateran University.

On 19 March 2009, he was appointed bishop of Asidonia-Jerez de la Frontera by Pope Benedict XVI and was consecrated on 6 June 2009 in the cathedral of Jerez de la Frontera by Cardinal Carlos Amigo Vallejo.

On 6 July 2020, he was appointed bishop of the Canary Islands diocese of Canarias (which includes the islands of Gran Canaria, Lanzarote and Fuertaventura) he took possession of the see on 2 October 2020.

== See also ==
- Diocese of Tenerife (the remaining Canary Islands)

Catholic Church titles
Preceded by Juan del Río Martín	Bishop of Jerez de la Frontera; 2009–2020	Succeeded by José Rico Pavés
Preceded by Francisco Cases Andreu	Bishop of Canarias; 2020–present	Succeeded by Incumbent
