= Diocese of Jerez de la Frontera =

Roman Catholic diocese in Spain

Coordinates: 36.6820°N 6.1411°W

Diocese of Jerez de la Frontera Dioecesis Assidonensis-Ierezensis Diócesis de Jerez de la Frontera

Catholic
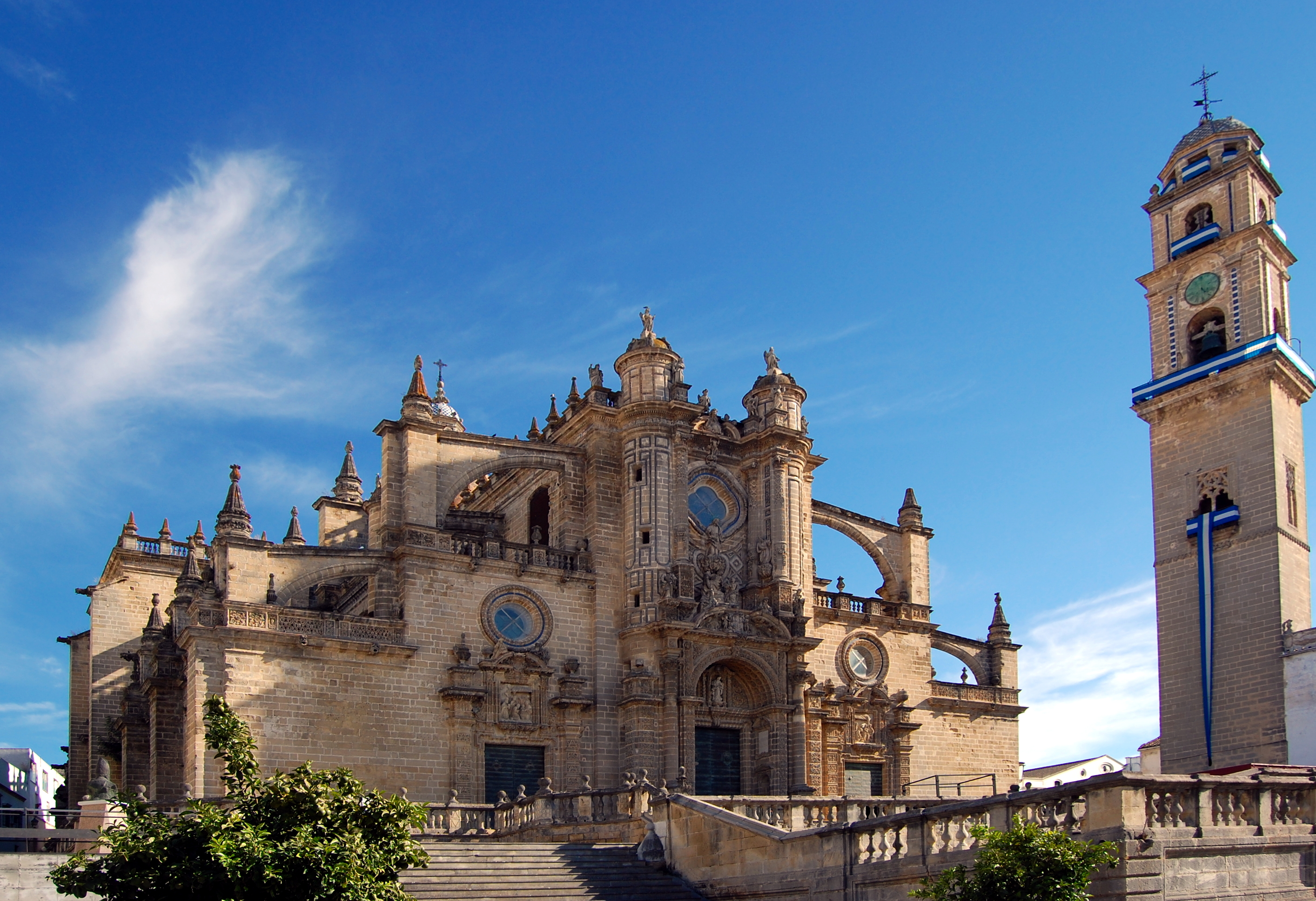
- Jerez de la Frontera Cathedral

Location
- Country: Spain
- Ecclesiastical province: Seville
- Metropolitan: Seville

Statistics
- Area: 3,928 km^{2} (1,517 sq mi)
- Population: Total; Catholics: (as of 2006); 507,331; 449,914 (88.7%)

Information
- Denomination: Roman Catholic
- Sui iuris church: Latin Church
- Rite: Roman Rite
- Established: 3 March 1980
- Cathedral: Cathedral of Our Lord Saviour in Jerez de la Frontera

Current leadership
- Pope: Leo XIV
- Bishop: José Rico Pavés

Website
- Website of the Diocese

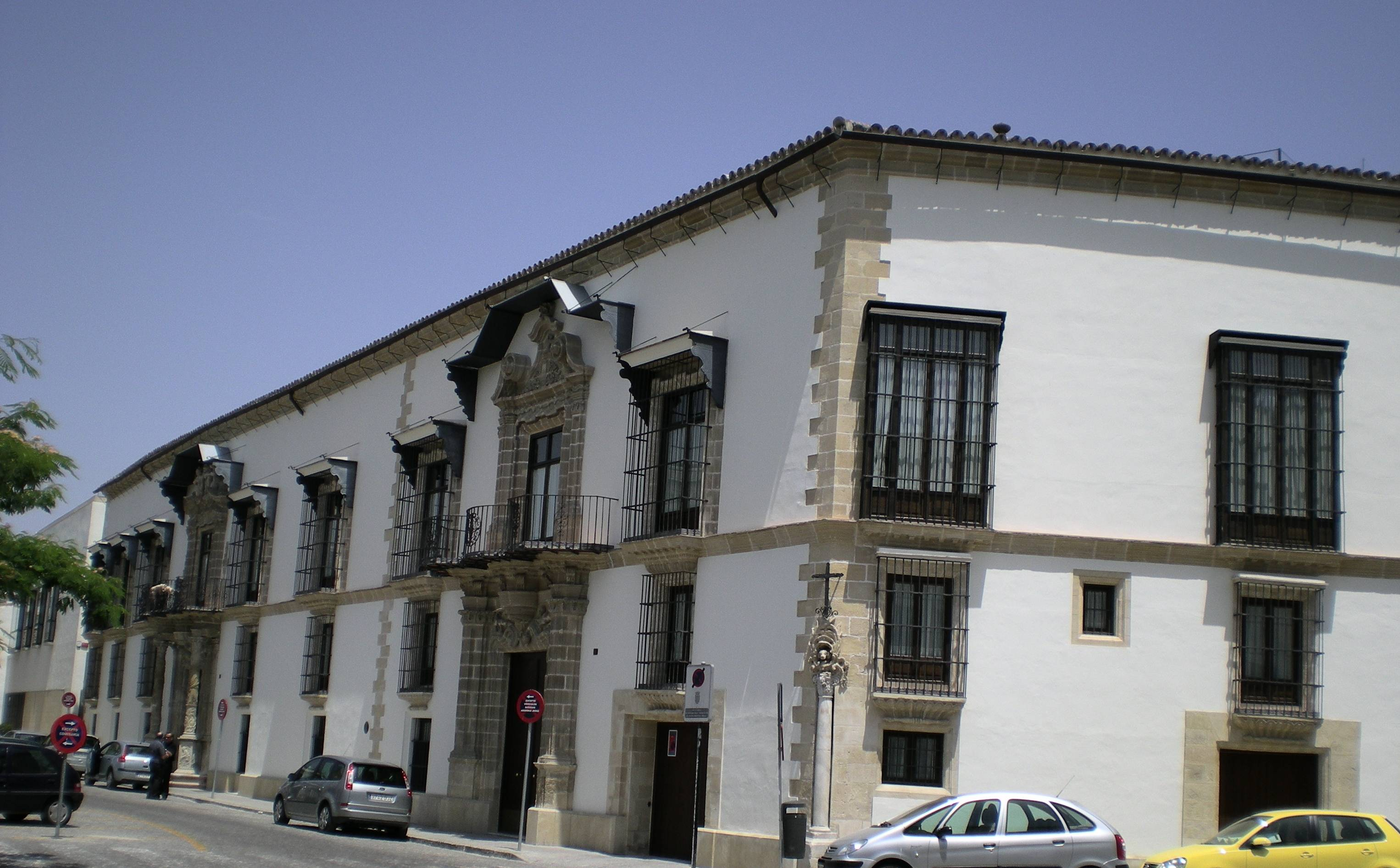
The Bishopric of the Diocese. Palace of Bertemati

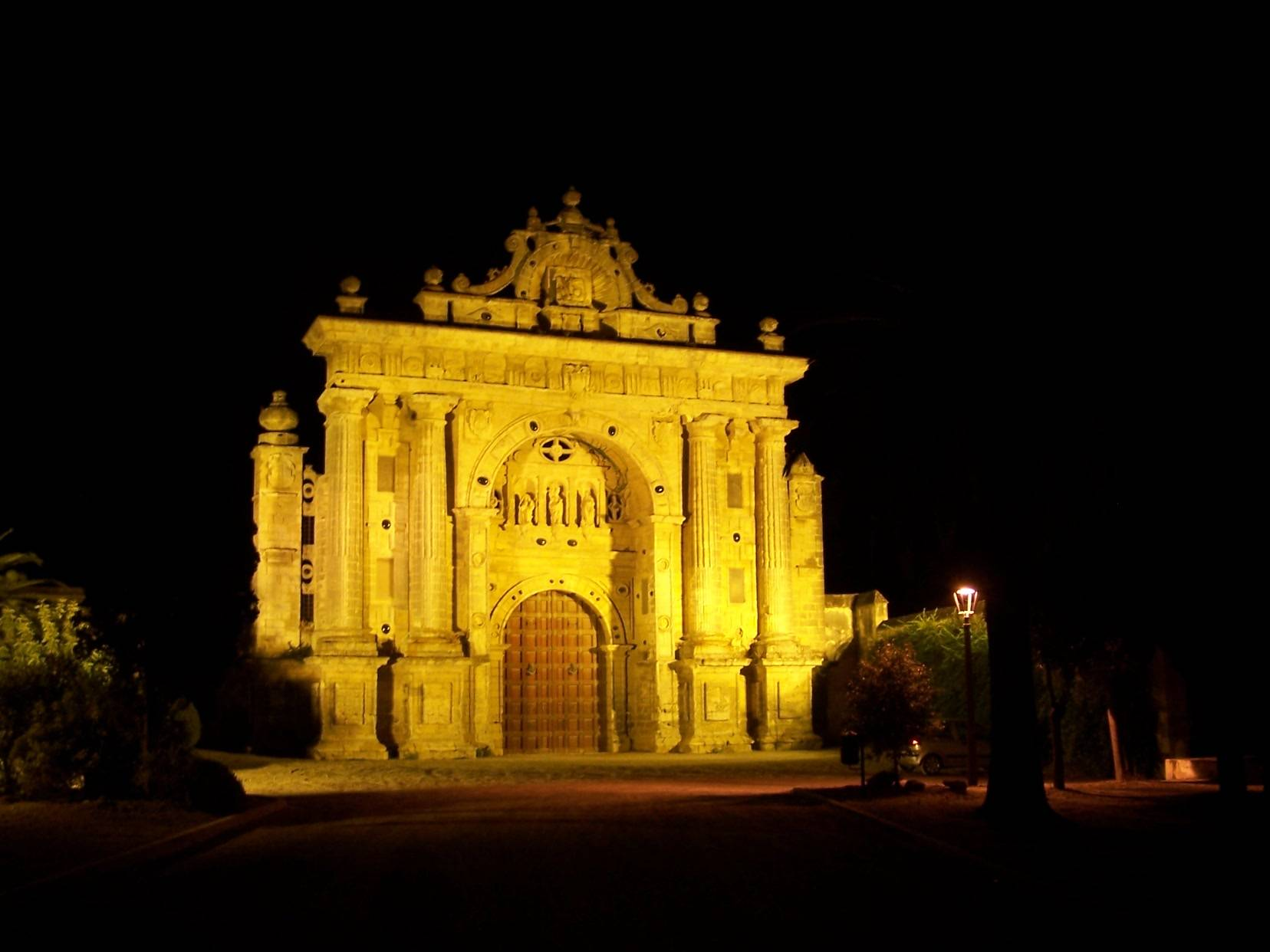
Fachada Cartuja de Jerez

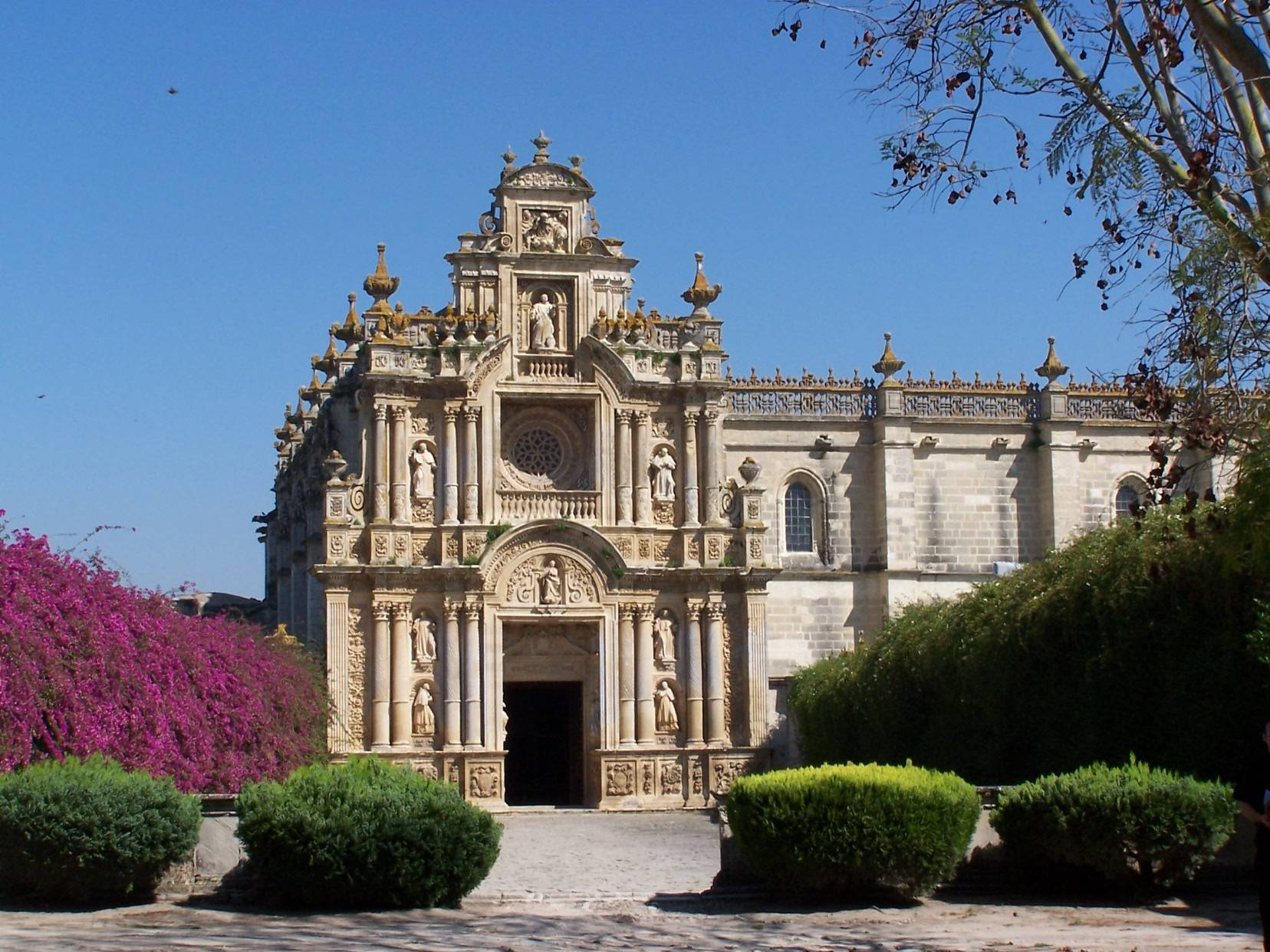
Fachada Iglesia Cartuja de Jerez

The Diocese of Jerez de la Frontera (Latin: Dioecesis Assidonensis-Ierezensis) is a Latin Church diocese of the Roman Catholic Church. Its name derives from the localities of Medina-Sidonia and Jerez de la Frontera. This bishopric was erected the 3 of March 1980 by means of a Papal Bull, with the name of Asidonense-Jerezano, in memory of the old Asidonense Bishopric and because its present seat is in Jerez de la Frontera. The main temple of this diocese the Colegiata of San Salvador, today Jerez's Cathedral. The Bishopric of the Diocese is in Palace of Bertemati, in the Seat of the Stream. Asidonia-Jerez Seminary was founded in 1985.

Juan Grande Roman has like santo pattern from the diocese and like patron to the Immaculate Conception.

It includes Jerez de la Frontera, Sanlúcar de Barrameda, El Puerto de Santa María, Chipiona, Rota, Trebujena, Arcos de la Frontera, Algar, Bornos, Espera, Villamartín, Prado del Rey, El Bosque, Ubrique, Puerto Serrano, Algodonales, Zahara de la Sierra, Benaocaz, Villaluenga del Rosario, Grazalema, El Gastor, Olvera, Alcalá del Valle, Torre Alháquime and Setenil de las Bodegas.

== Deaneries ==
- Arciprestazgo de Jerez
- Arciprestazgo de Sanlúcar de Barrameda
- Arciprestazgo de El Puerto de Santa María
- Arciprestazgo de Arcos de la Frontera
- Arciprestazgo de Grazalema
- Arciprestazgo de Zahara de la Sierra

== History ==
It is believed the present city of Medina-Sidonia was known in antiquity as Sidonia or Asidonia, a Phoenician colony whose name derives from the name of the city of its founders, Sidón. This bishopric was known as Asidonense.

== Bishopric ==
Bishopric of the old Assidonia

1. Maximus (497)
2. Manuncio (516)
3. Basiliano (593)
4. Rufino (628)
5. Pimenio (629–649)
6. Suetonio (661)
7. Paciano (672)
8. Fulgencio, monje benedictino
9. Theuderacio (Teoderacio) (681–688)
10. Geroncio (690–693)
11. Cesario (698)
12. Exuperio, obispo mártir por los Musulmanes (713–714)
13. Juan, monje (714)
14. Miro (862)
15. Pedro (s IX)
16. Esteban (950)
17. Anonymous (Go to Toledo 1145)
18. Sede suppressed (h. 1146–1980)

Bishopric of the Asidonia-Jerez Diocese

1. Rafael Bellido Caro (1980–2000)
2. Juan del Río Martín (2000–2008), appointed Archbishop of Spain, Military
3. José Mazuelos Pérez (2009–2020), appointed Bishop of Canarias
4. José Rico Pavés (2021–present)

== Also Sees ==
- Bishopric Asidonia-Jerez Diocese
- Asidonia-Jerez Seminary Catholic
