= Marcial Cuquerella =

Spanish entrepreneur (b. 1977)

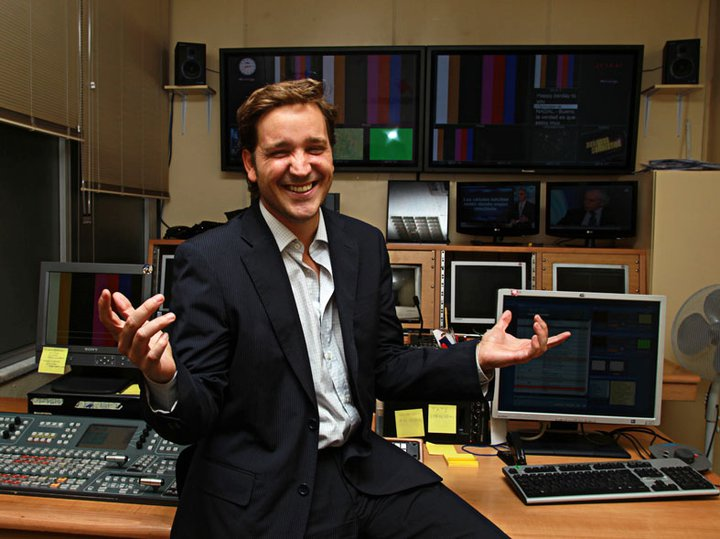
- Marcial Cuquerella
- Born: 19 November 1977 (age 48); Cartagena, Murcia
- Education: Comillas Pontifical University; IESE; IE
- Occupations: Chairman and CEO of Wouzee Founder, The Glue Concept

Marcial Cuquerella Gamboa (born November 19, 1977) is a Spanish businessman, entrepreneur and investor. He is the founder of 7NN Televisión. and the live streaming company Gooru, where he is the Chairman and CEO. Cuquerella is also the founder of The Glue Concept, a company incubator which operates in the US, México and Spain.

== Career ==
Cuquerella has two degrees in engineering (Computing Engineer and Civil Engineer) and two MBAs (IE and IESE). He began his career as a 24-year-old CEO at Grupo Cope Navarra, then in 2005 he was appointed CEO of the Multimedia Company Intereconomía Corp running three TV Stations, a radio, two magazines and a national newspaper in Spain. He has funded and produced films related to religion, such as Pope John Paul II

He founded Wouzee, a start up based on the live streaming concept, which became famous in February 2016 during the Princess Cristina Trials when someone sneaked a camera in to the proceedings and broadcast everything, despite the judge banning any recording devices in the chamber.

In April 2014 he founded Wouzee America LLC in Houston, Miami and Puebla (México).

In 2014, he was identified by the testimony of witnesses during a trial as a leading figure in Spain of the Mexican far-right cult El Yunque.

In 2021, Marcial Cuquerella launched a new broadcast channel, 7NN, focused on news and current events. Cuquerella left 7NN in February 2023 due to new appointments made by the Chairman, and the channel suffered financial problems.

== Controversy ==
On September 9, 2014, during an interview Cuquerella was asked for advice for young people looking for a job, to which he said, "If you are looking for a job, do it for free a couple of months, if you are good enough you will get hired and even they will pay you those months". This statement was broadcast by national media sites. The next day he released a press statement where he said that his only intention was to serve as inspiration, not to hurt any feelings.

The Spanish newspaper El País has referred to him as a leader of the "Spanish Tea Party".
