= El Yunque (organization) =

Alleged Mexican secret society

- Organización Nacional del Yunque
- Formation: 1953; 73 years ago
- Type: Secret society
- Purpose: Integrism; National Catholicism; Hispanidad
- Headquarters: Puebla de Zaragoza, Mexico
- Key people: Ramón Plata Moreno; Manuel Díaz Cid
- Parent organization: Los TECOS

The Organización Nacional del Yunque (English: National Organization of the Anvil) or simply El Yunque (in English: The Anvil) is the name of an alleged Mexican secret society whose existence was first claimed by journalist Alvaro Delgado in 2003.

== Organization ==
Alvaro Delgado described El Yunque as antisemtic, far-right and virulently Catholic. He also claims that top members of PAN and former President Vicente Fox's cabinet are also members of El Yunque. The organization was allegedly formed in Puebla in the early 1950s.

Since it is allegedly a secret organization, most reports about it come from its critics and alleged ex-members. One notable purported ex-member is the former mayor of Puebla, Luis Paredes Moctezuma, who has led demonstrations against the organization, demanding the expulsion of all heads of PAN who are also affiliated to El Yunque. Paredes Moctezuma has also explicitly pointed current party leader Manuel Espino Barrientos as a yunquista. He has said that El Yunque played a role backing Vicente Fox's campaign in 2000.

In 2007, Paredes claimed the group controlled four state governments in Mexico and that it established cells in the United States in the early 1990s, saying, "They're in Dallas, in Boston, in Washington, D.C., in Los Angeles, in Miami." A low-quality video of what appeared to be a Yunque initiation ceremony featuring unidentified men and Yunque symbolism appeared on YouTube in which one man explains that the goal of the organization is to conquer Mexico and Latin America, but the video may have been staged.

Paredes claimed El Yunque was formed in the early 1950s as a reaction to anti-Catholic sentiment under the Institutional Revolutionary Party (PRI). He says it attracted religious students who sought to counter the leftist influence reflected in the Cuban revolution, Maoist China and the Soviet Union. He says the group opposed the presidential candidacy of centrist Felipe Calderón, and was thus in a poor position to influence him.

According to its critics, the secret organization of El Yunque was supposedly paramilitary in nature, performing its actions (including political assassination mostly through a set of front organizations) and, according to the magazine Contralínea, this included the student organization MURO at the National Autonomous University of Mexico in the 1960s.

Named members in the 2000s included: state governor Juan Manuel Oliva; Gerardo Mosqueda, his chief of staff; and local politician Alberto Diosdado. Representatives of all three men denied involvement.

== Skepticism ==
Members of PAN have condemned Delgado's claims as "pure fiction", comparing it to the mythical monster, the chupacabra, and saying that El Yunque has nothing to do with the party. Delgado has been accused of inventing the organization in order to sway the 2006 Mexican elections. A former PAN presidential candidate and party head, Luis H. Alvarez, said that he believed the organization was real but negligible. One political commentator dismissed claims about the group as an easy way to smear political opponents, "I have never found anyone who admits to being a member of El Yunque. All I see are attacks from the left. It's an easy way to dismiss someone."

== El Yunque in Spain ==
In 2012, Delgado reported that El Yunque had spread to Spain, influencing the conservative People's Party. He would later report a connection between El Yunque and the far-right political party Vox. In early 2012, the newspaper El Confidencial suggested that the Organización del Bien Común (English: Organisation for the Common Good) was a front for a Spanish offshoot of the organisation. Those implicated in the allegations started legal actions against publications reporting on the alleged group. The first was by Profesionales por la Ética against digital newspaper Forum Libertas and its editor Josep Miró i Ardèvol, which was dismissed later that year. The second, by conservative organisation Hazte Oir against El Confidencial, was also dismissed in 2012.

The third was brought by Hazte Oir against Fernando López Luengos a layman who had prepared a report called El Transparente de la Catedral de Toledo commissioned by the Spanish Episcopal Conference. In May 2014, a Madrilenian judge declared there was possibly evidence to show a relationship between members of the association HazteOir (HO) and El Yunque. However, she could not say with certainty that such an organization exists. It has also been linked to CitizenGO, a foundation created by HazteOir. (HO was later subsumed under CitizenGO.) In 2021, the foundation of conservative TV news channel 7NN was linked to El Yunque via the Francisco Franco National Foundation and Vox.

Some bishops have commented on the potential offshoot of El Yunque in Spain. Cardinal Antonio Cañizares Llovera said in 2011 that he had assumed El Yunque were working behind the scenes, saying "They're no longer called El Yunque, but they're now the Asociación por el Bien Común." Meanwhile, Joaquín María López de Andújar y Cánovas del Castillo, the bishop of Getafe, in March 2015 said, after learning of the connection, that he would not support members, and implored them not to attend his diocese. His deputy, José Rico Pavés, said that "El Yunque exists, and that is not good for the Church."

A 24 September 2016 article in El País linked El Yunque to the anti-vaxxer movement CitizenGo and HazteOir which are headquartered in Spain.

== El Yunque in Chile ==
It has also been alleged that El Yunque has had an influence in Chile since 2006, when Salvador Salazar, a politician from the PAN, founded the Muévete Chile movement. At the end of 2016, an investigation unveiled the society's influence there, singling out José Antonio Rosas, the leader of the Academia de Líderes Católicos, as one of its figureheads. Rosas admitted to having been a member of the group until 2014, however denied that El Yunque had ever infiltrated the Academia.
