= Francisco Cases Andreu =

Spanish Roman Catholic Bishop

His Most Reverend Francisco Cases Andreu
- Emeritus Bishop of Canarias
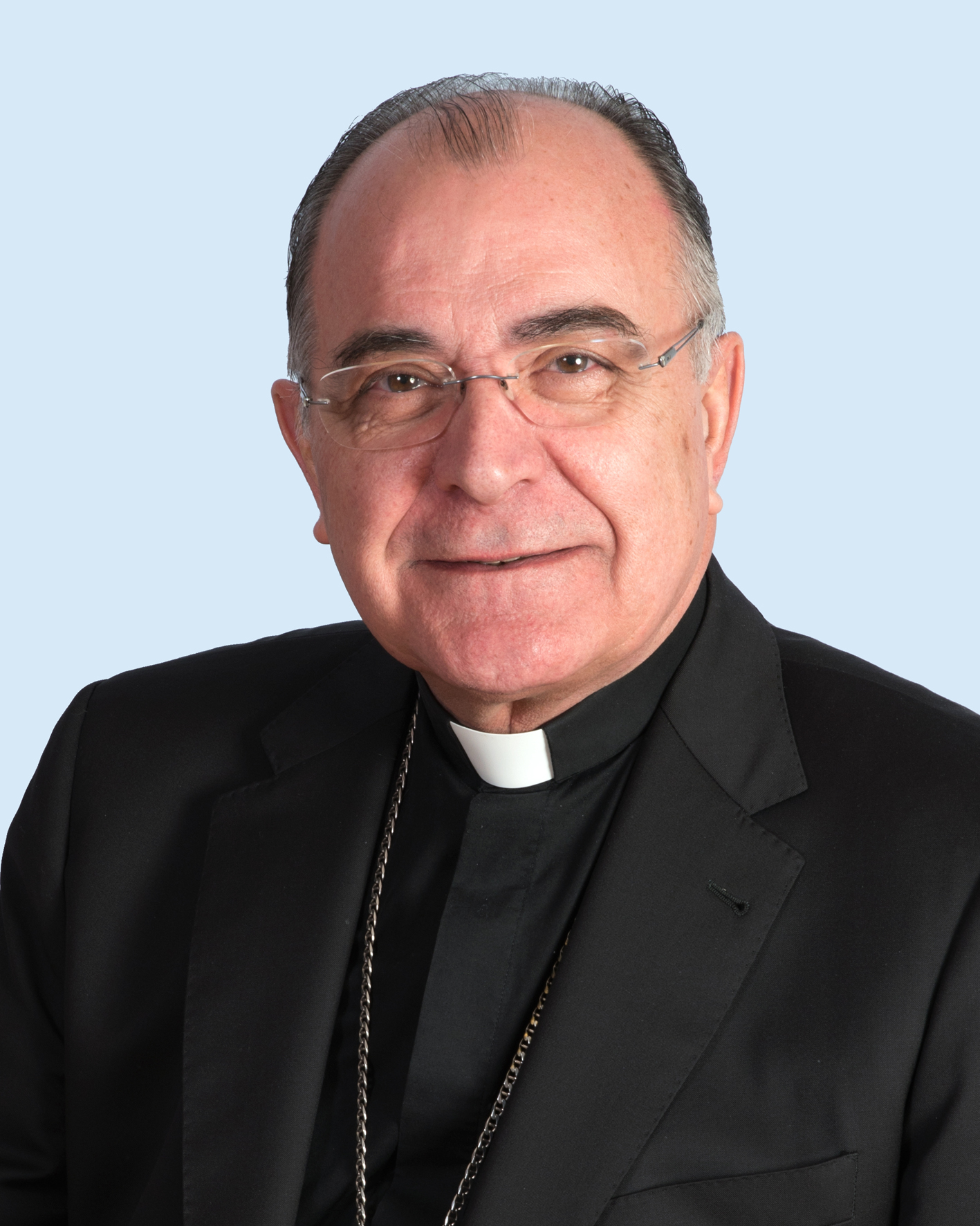
- Archdiocese: Seville
- Diocese: Canarias
- Predecessor: Ramón Echarren Ystúriz

Orders
- Ordination: 14 April 1968
- Consecration: 10 April 1994 by Mario Tagliaferri

Personal details
- Denomination: Roman Catholic
- Motto: In Communionem
- Coat of arms

Francisco Cases Andreu (born 23 October 1944 in Orihuela, Spain) is a retired Spanish Roman Catholic prelate. He is bishop emeritus of the Diocese of Canarias in the Canary Islands (covering the islands of Gran Canaria, Lanzarote and Fuerteventura). Previously he served as Auxiliary bishop of Orihuela and titular bishop of Timici and as the ordinary of Albacete.

== Biography ==
Cases was born in Orihuela, Spain on 23 October 1944, he studied for the priesthood in the Seminario de San Miguel, in Orihuela. being ordained on 14 April 1968. Pope John Paul II appointed him auxiliary bishop of Orihuela and titular bishop of Timici (Algeria), he was consecrated on 10 April 1994 by Archbishop Mario Tagliaferri. He was subsequently appointed bishop of Albacete on 31 August 1996 and of Canarias on 26 November 2005 by Pope Benedict XVI. As is obligatory upon reaching retirement age, he tendered his resignation to Pope Francis who accepted this on 6 July 2020.

== See also ==
- Diocese of Canarias
- Diocese of Tenerife (the remaining Canary Islands)

Catholic Church titles
Preceded by Toribio Ticona Porco	Titular bishop of Timici; 1994–1996	Succeeded by John Forrosuelo Du
Preceded by Victorio Oliver Domingo	Bishop of Albacete; 1996–2005	Succeeded by Ciriaco Benavente Mateos
Preceded by Ramón Echarren Ystúriz	Bishop of Canarias; 2005–2020	Succeeded by José Mazuelos Pérez
