= Jerez de la Frontera Cathedral =

- Cathedral of the Holy Saviour
- Spanish: Catedral del Salvador
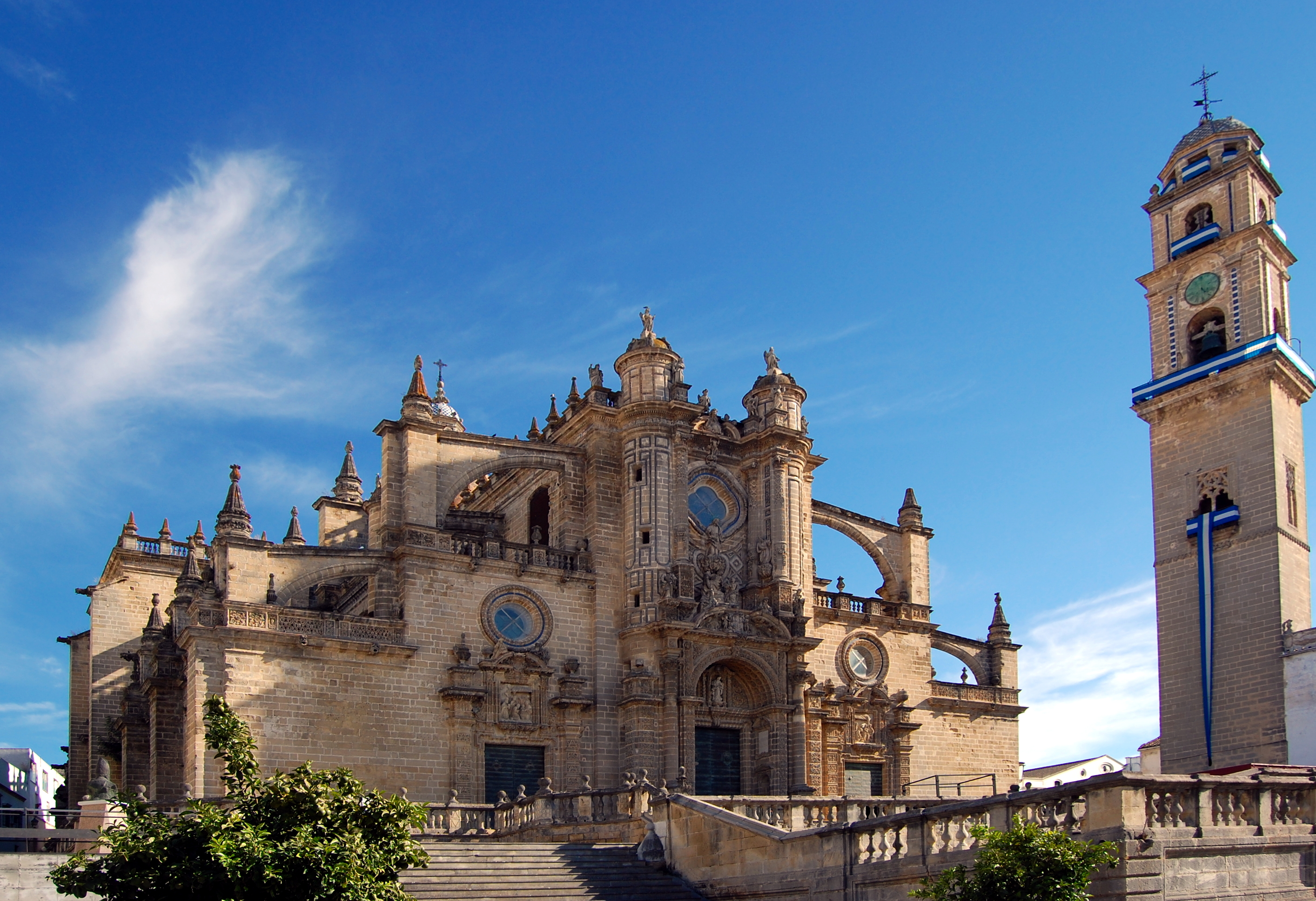
- North façade
- Jerez de la Frontera Cathedral
- 36.681968°N 6.140979°W
- Location: Jerez de la Frontera
- Address: Plaza Encarnación
- Country: Spain
- Denomination: Catholic
- Website: catedraldejerez.es

History
- Dedication: Jesus as Saviour
- Dedicated: 3 March 1980

Architecture
- Style: Gothic, Baroque, Neoclassical
- Years built: 17th–18th century

Administration
- Metropolis: Seville
- Diocese: Asidonia-Jerez

Clergy
- Bishop: José Rico Pavés

Spanish Cultural Heritage
- Type: Non-movable
- Criteria: Monument
- Designated: 3 June 1931
- Reference no.: RI-51-0000498

The Cathedral of the Holy Saviour is a Catholic cathedral located in Jerez de la Frontera, Andalusia, southern Spain. It is the seat of the Roman Catholic Diocese of Asidonia-Jerez. It was declared Bien de Interés Cultural in 1931.

== Style ==
Built in the 17th century, it is a mix of Gothic, Baroque and Neoclassical style. It was elevated to the rank of cathedral in 1980.

== Interior ==
The cathedral is on a central plan with a nave and four aisles of uneven height. The building is supported externally by normal and flying buttresses and crossing the transept is a dome.

The interior houses a Virgin Mary by Francisco Zurbarán, and a late 15th-century Gothic Crucifix (named Cristo de la Viga).

== Gallery ==
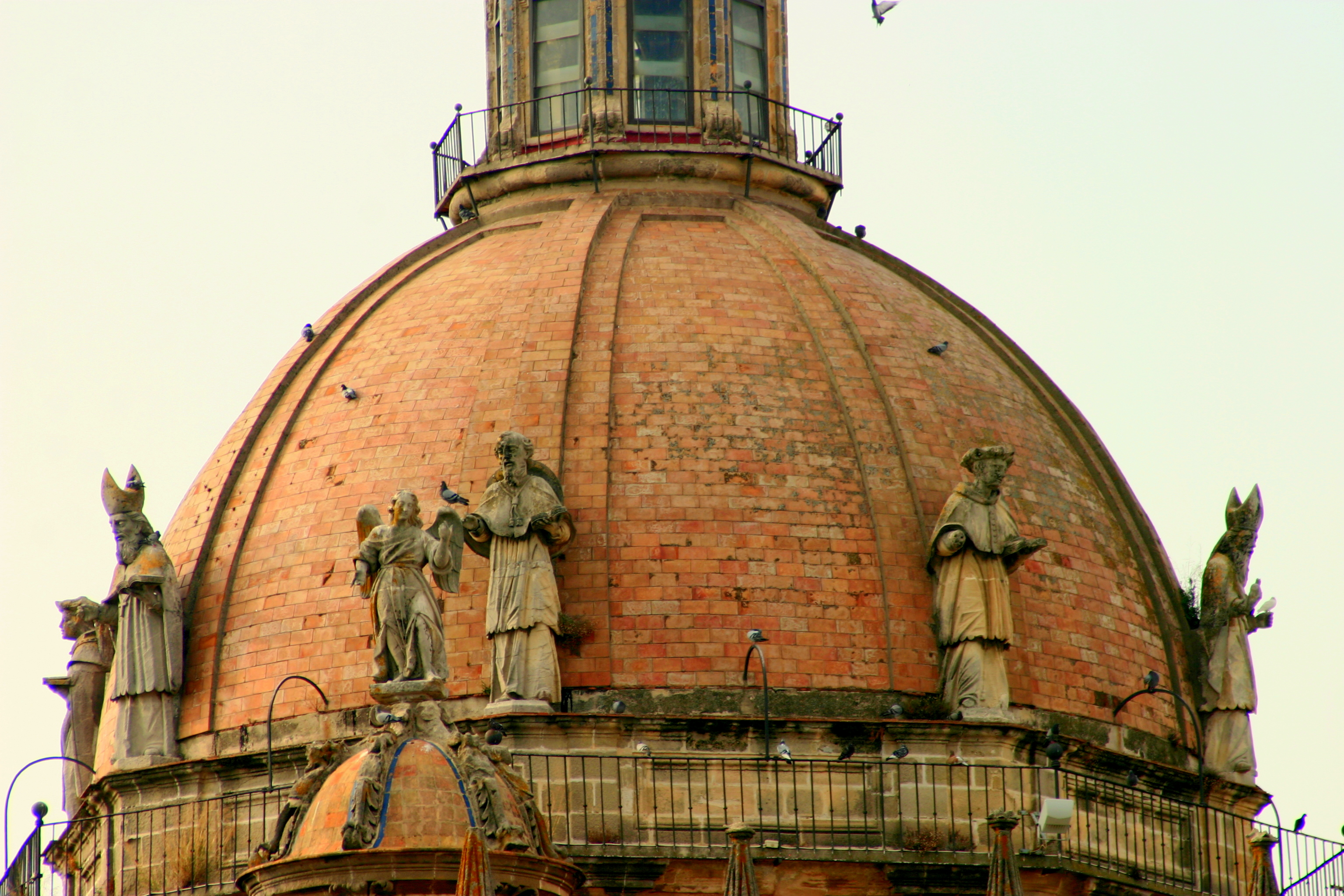
Detail of the dome.

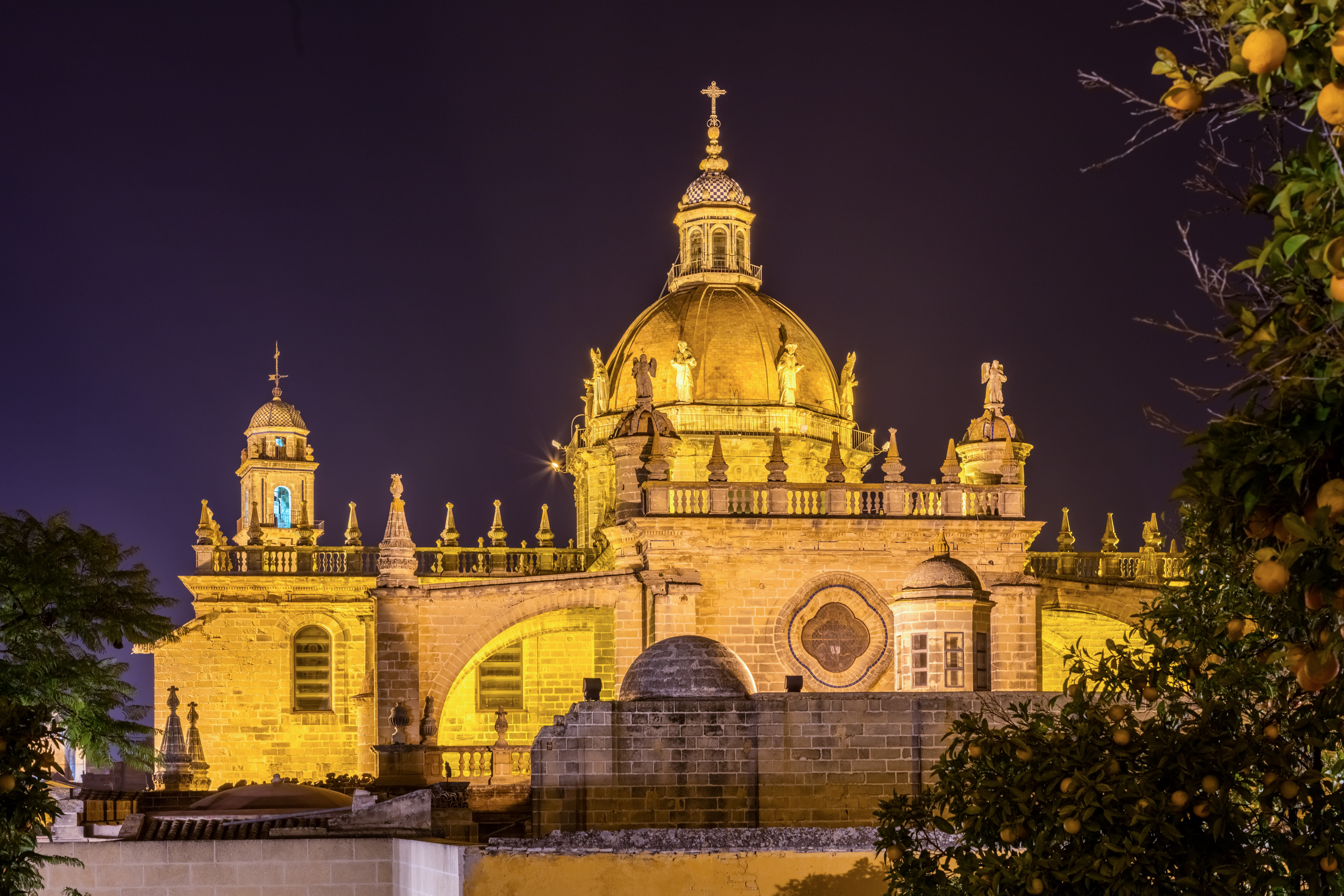
Cathedral view from the Alcázar of Jerez de la Frontera.

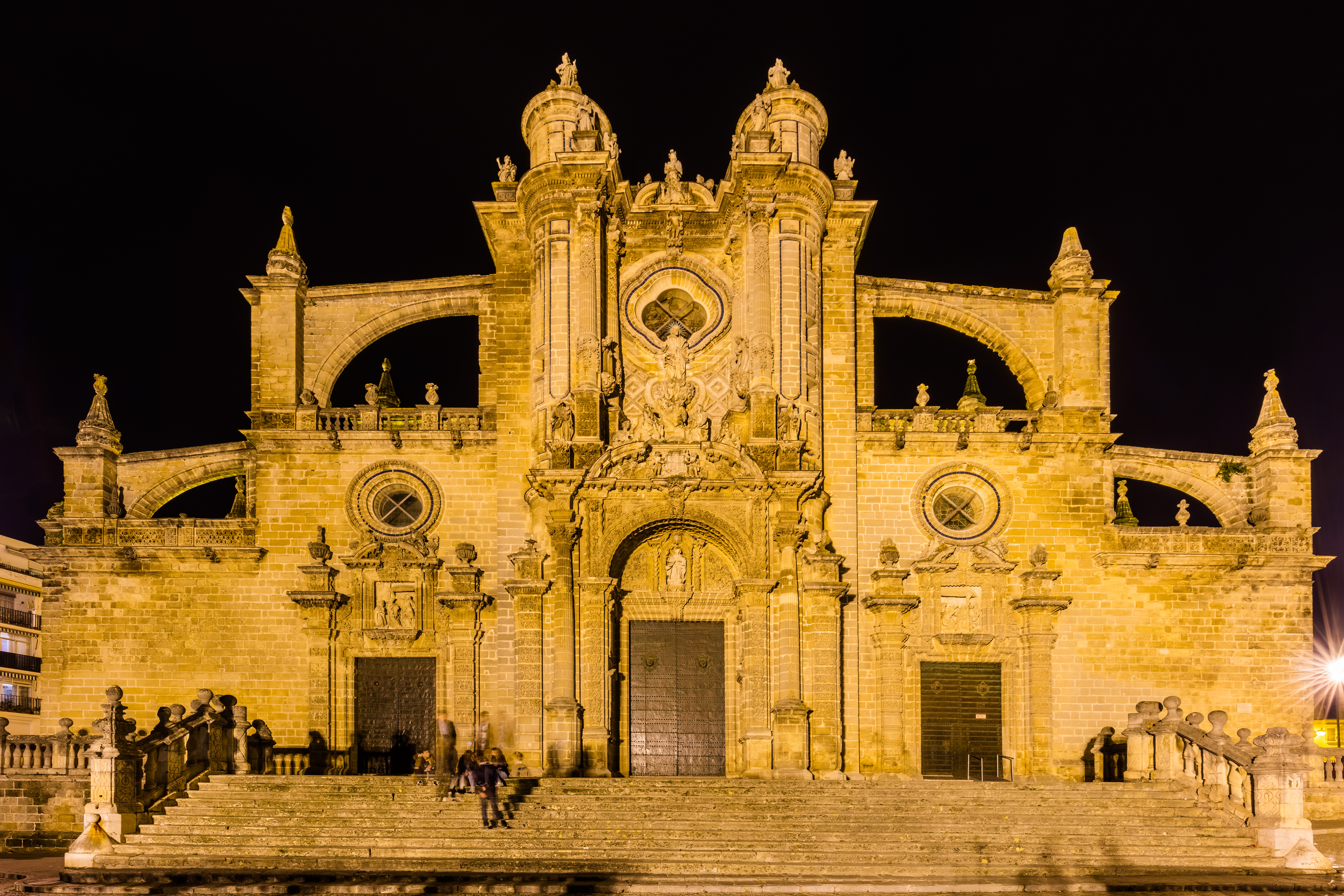
Main facade.

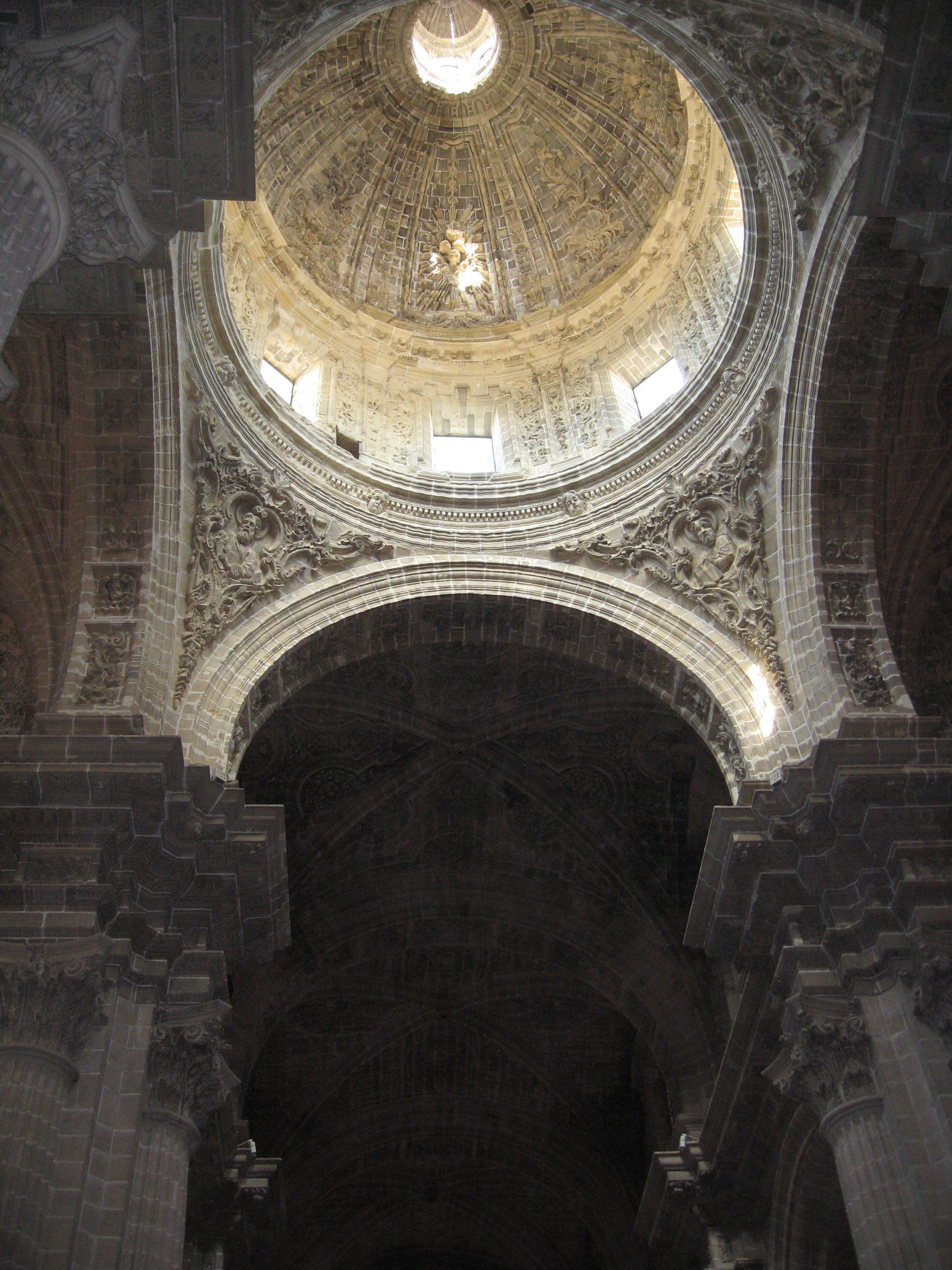
Dome from inside.

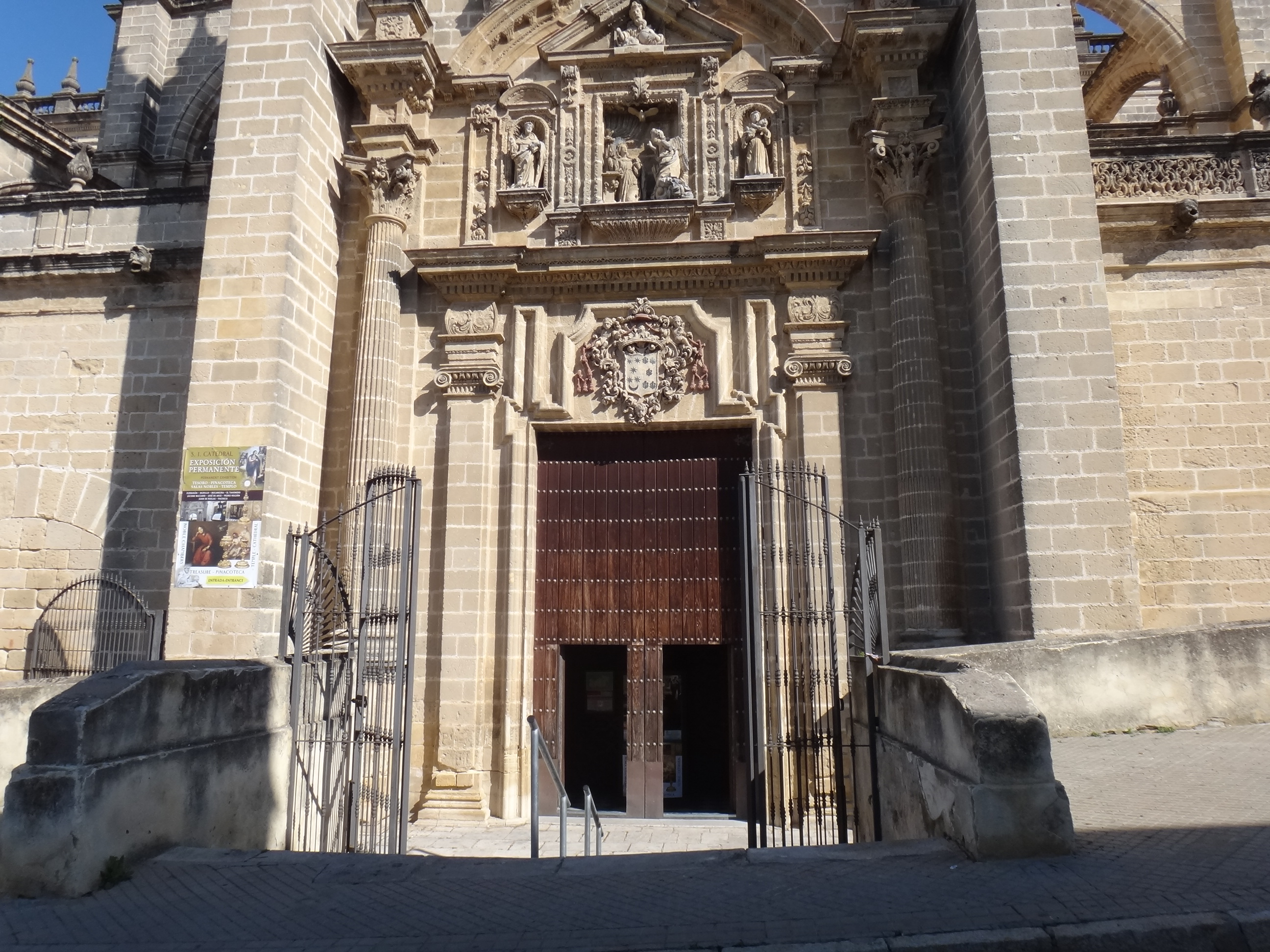
Entrance to the Cathedral Museum.

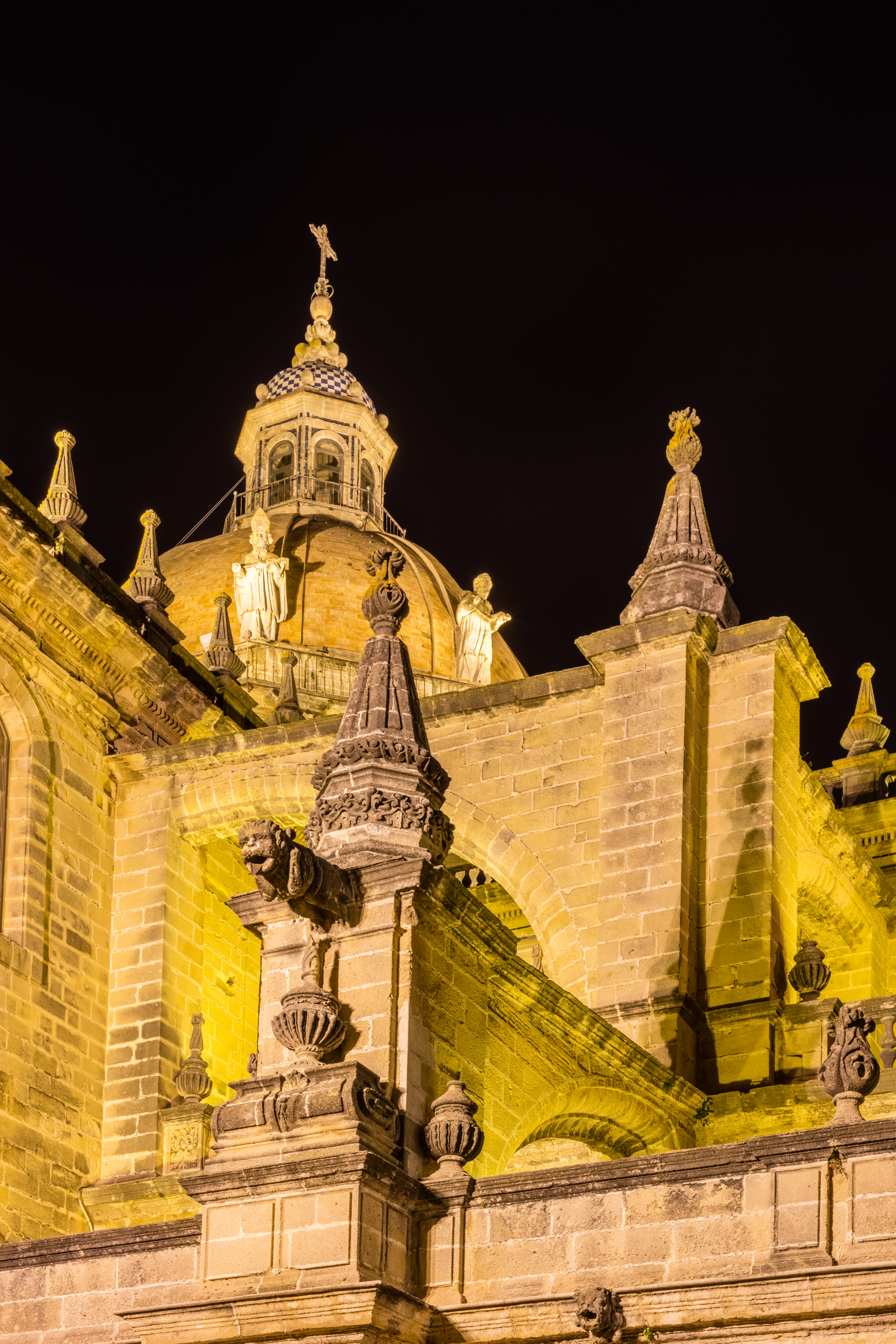
Details of the top.

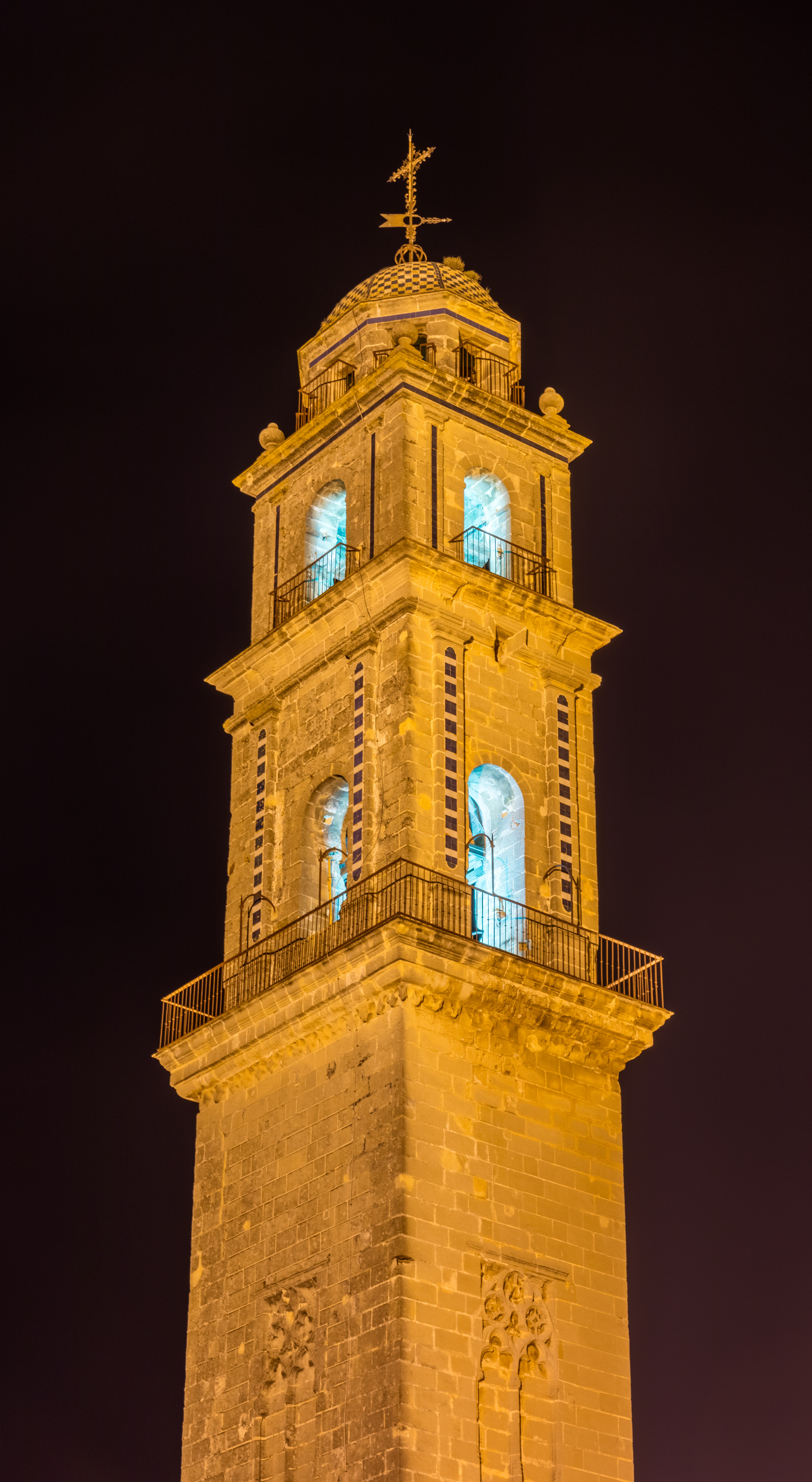
Cathedral tower.

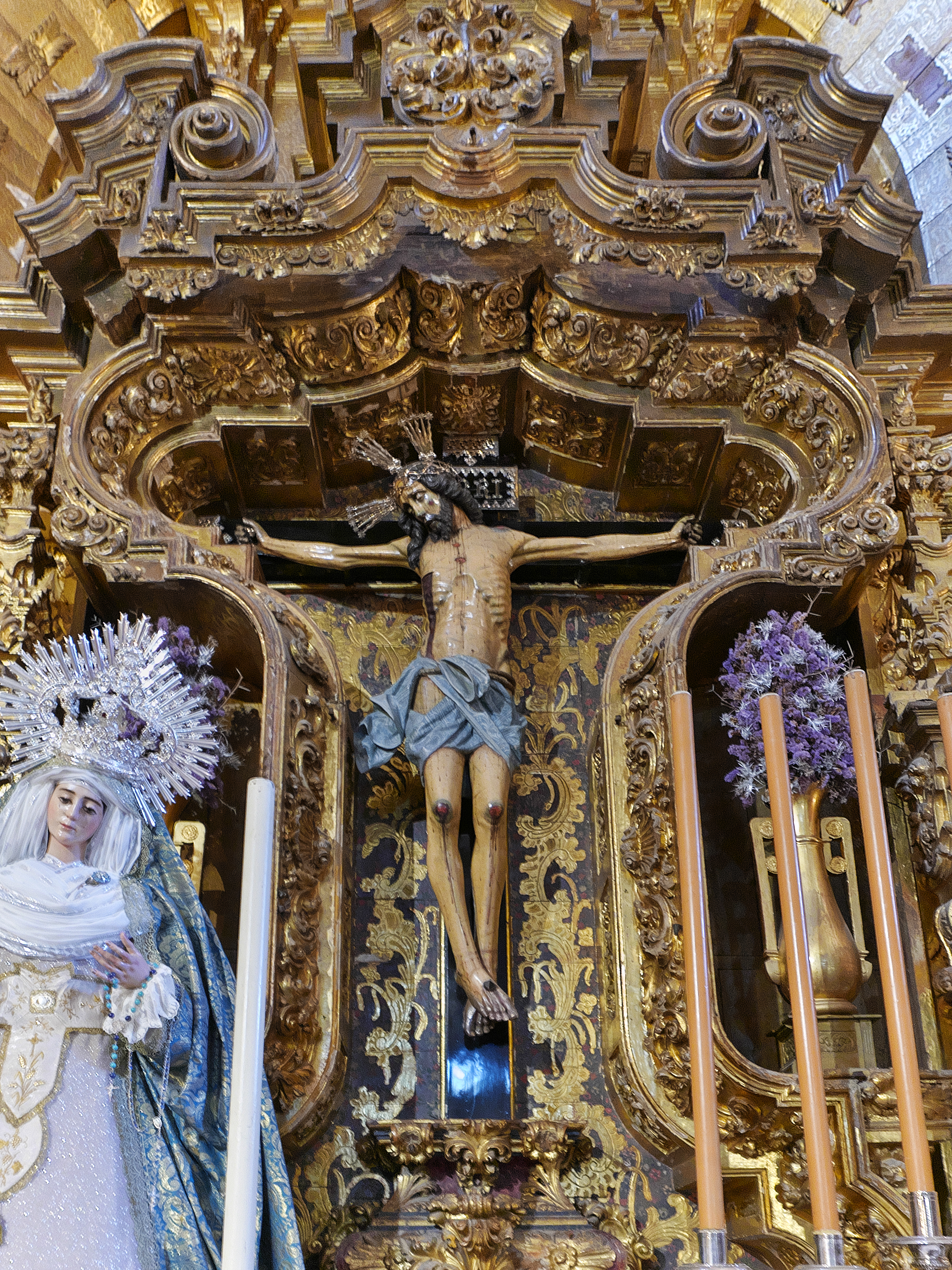
Cristo de la Viga.

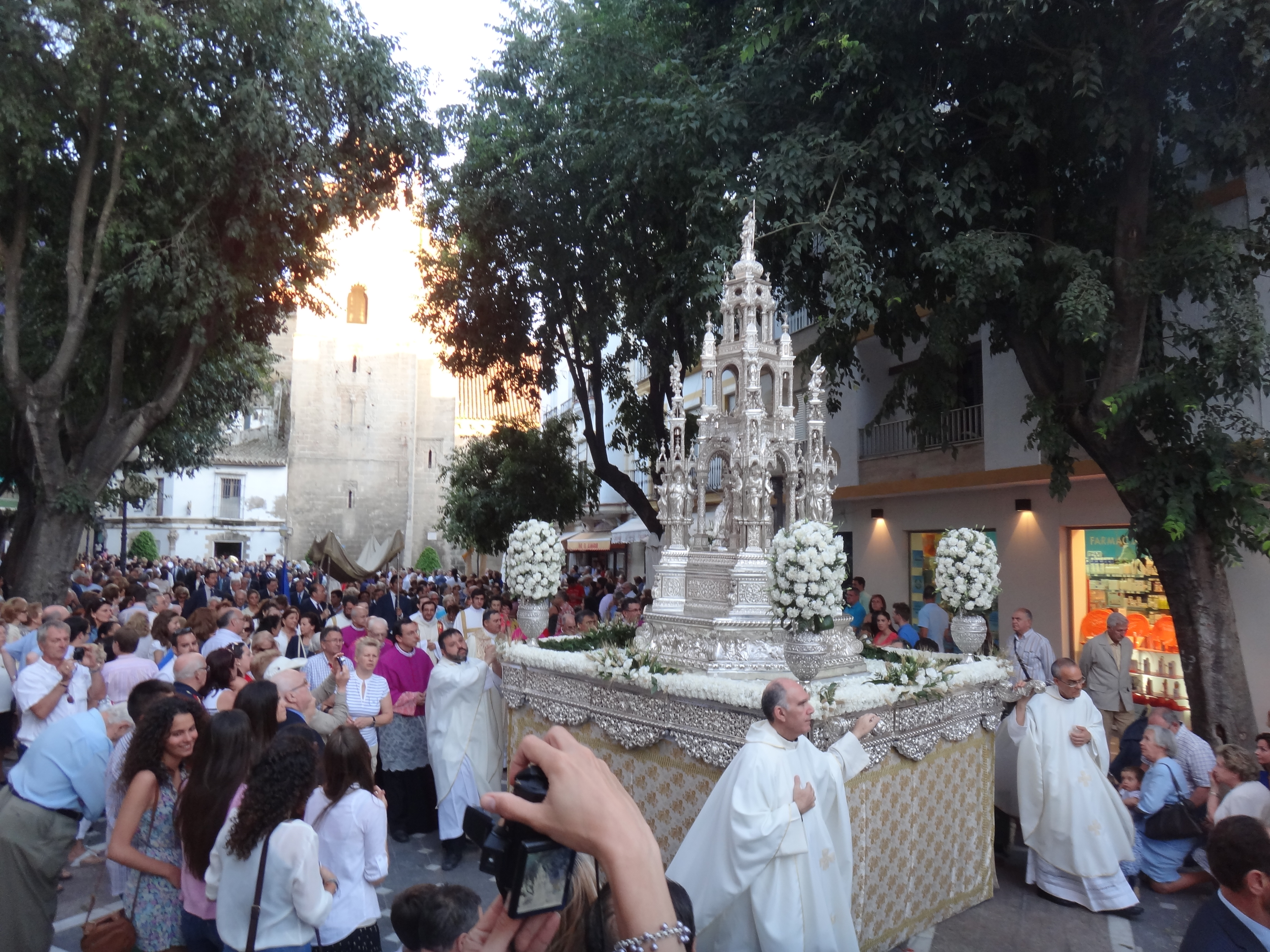
Custody of the Corpus in procession.

== See also ==
- List of Bien de Interés Cultural in the Province of Cádiz
