= 7NN =

Spanish Television channel

- Country: Spain
- Broadcast area: Spain
- Headquarters: Madrid

Programming
- Language(s): Spanish
- Picture format: 1080i (16:9 HDTV)

Ownership
- Owner: Producciones Audiovisuales Hispania

History
- Launched: 12 October 2021
- Closed: 31 March 2023

Links
- Website: https://7nn.tv/

7NN was a Spanish free-to-air television channel owned by Producciones Audiovisuales Hispania S.A. which was launched on 12 October 2021. The channel broadcast for free in the Madrid area and through pay television in the rest of Spain, in addition being streamed online. It was considered a channel with a conservative editorial stance and ideologically close to Vox, a far-right political party.

== History ==
In September 2021, the company announced its intention to start a new Spanish-language news and information channel to be aimed at a conservative audience and directed by Marcial Cuquerella. At first, the project was named La Alternativa; its founders sought to establish a channel similar in style to Fox News and extend its influence to Spain, Latin America and the United States.

The channel began broadcasting on October 12, 2021, National Holiday of Spain, as a test under its final name 7NN. In its beginnings, the channel broadcast on digital terrestrial television in Madrid, Zaragoza and the Region of Murcia.

At the beginning of 2023, the channel entered into a financial crisis due to poor revenues; Cuquerella left 7NN in February, and the channel laid off staff and ceased being broadcast outside the Madrid area in March.

On March 28, 2023, 7NN announced the end of its broadcasts because the channel was unable to generate the necessary income to cover operating expenses. Finally, the 7NN signal was turned off at midnight on March 31.

== Programming ==
7NN's programming mainly consists of news and talk shows, as well as some cultural and entertainment content. The channel's objective at the beginning was to provide informative programming with a conservative ideology to compete with LaSexta or Canal 24 Horas, considered progressive media by part of the Spanish political spectrum.

== Ideology ==
Some media outlets consider 7NN to be close to Vox, a far-right political party, as well as organizations such as El Yunque and the Francisco Franco National Foundation. However, the directors of the channel have stated that they seek to maintain a neutral ideology while telling the truth of the facts.

The channel's editorial leanings have already led it to clashes with some political parties such as PSOE, Unidas Podemos, Catalan and Basque separatists and other left-wing or green parties that came to request the prohibition of 7NN journalists in the Congress of Deputies.
