= Palace of Bertemati, Jerez de la Frontera =

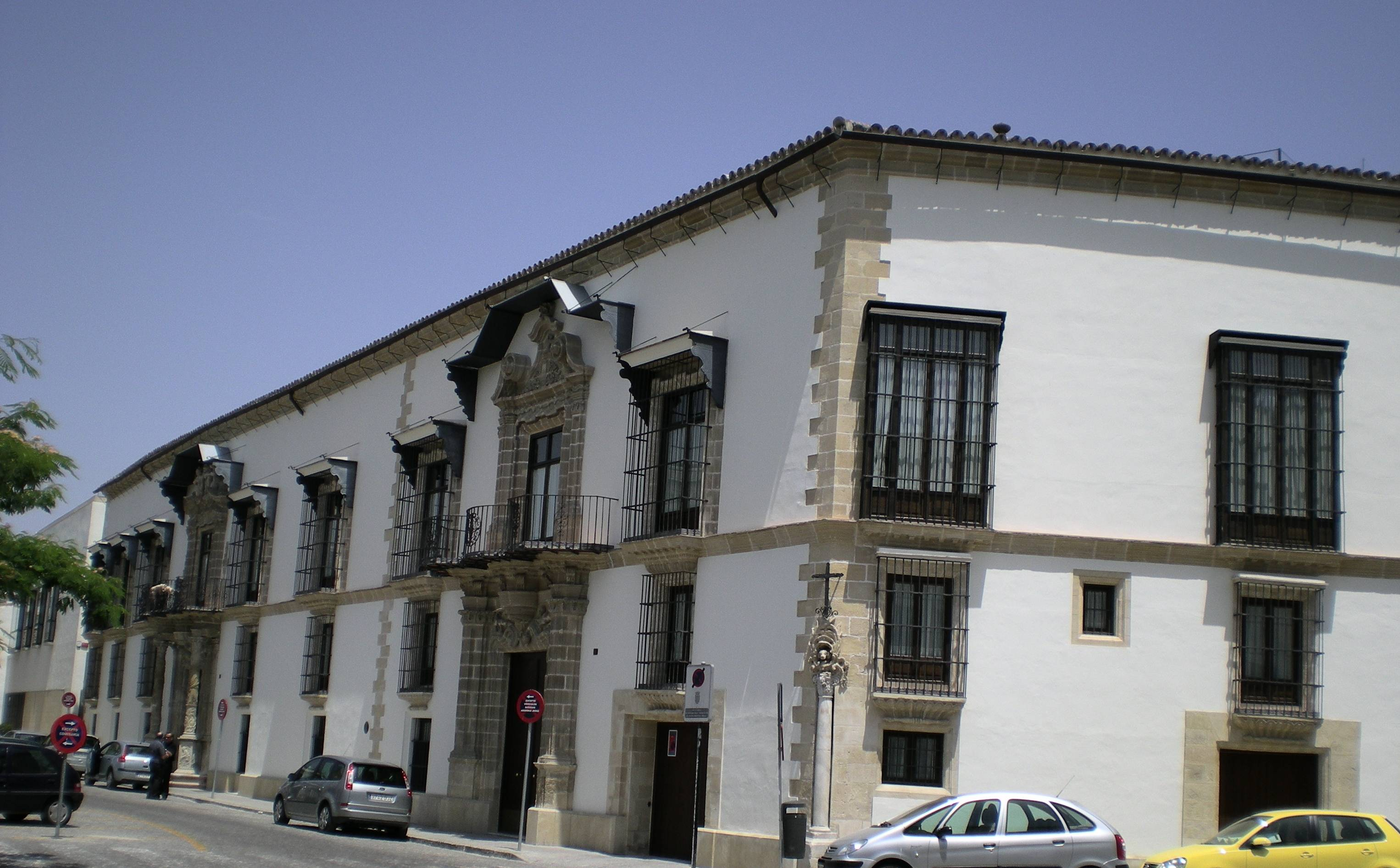
Palace Bertemati.

The Palace of Bertemati is a historical edifice in Jerez de la Frontera in Andalusia, Spain.

The palace is a Baroque building, constructed by the Sopranis-Davila family in the 18th century on the inner slope of a stream. At the beginning of the 19th century, the family sold the palace. It was subsequently divided into two buildings. The larger building become the property of Jose Bertemati, a successful retailer. Bertemati transformed the property into a neoclassic structure. The smaller building went through a series of owners. It was transformed into an eclectic house with French influences.

In 1942, under the auspice of Monsignor Bertemati, the Roman Catholic Diocese of Jerez de la Frontera assumed ownership of both buildings. They provided the entire for use by the Franciscan Sisters of Mary Immaculate.

The restoration of the palace began in 2002. It was finished in 2006 taking place the transfer to the new Seat. Monteiro de Castro was inaugurated by the Apostolic Nuncio and the bishop on 8 December 2005.
