= Quintanilla Vivar =

- Municipality and town
- Flag Coat of arms

- Location within Spain
- Coordinates: 42°24′52″N 3°41′22″W
- Country: Spain
- Autonomous community: Castile and León
- Province: Burgos
- Comarca: Alfoz de Burgos

Area
  - Total: 13.38 km^{2} (5.17 sq mi)
- Elevation: 849 m (2,785 ft)

Population (2025-01-01)
  - Total: 890
  - Density: 67/km^{2} (170/sq mi)
- Time zone: UTC+1 (CET)
  - Summer (DST): UTC+2 (CEST)
- Postal code: 09140
- Website: www.quintanillavivar.es

Quintanilla Vivar (formerly known as Quintanilla Morocisla) is a municipality and town located in the province of Burgos, Castile and León, Spain.

The village of Vivar del Cid, reputed birthplace of El Cid, is included in the municipality.

== Demography ==
According to the 2009 census (INE), the municipality has a population of 741 inhabitants.

Historical population
Year	Pop.	±% p.a.
1991	306	—
1996	369	+3.82%
2001	554	+8.47%
2004	581	+1.60%
2007	679	+5.33%
2009	741	+4.47%

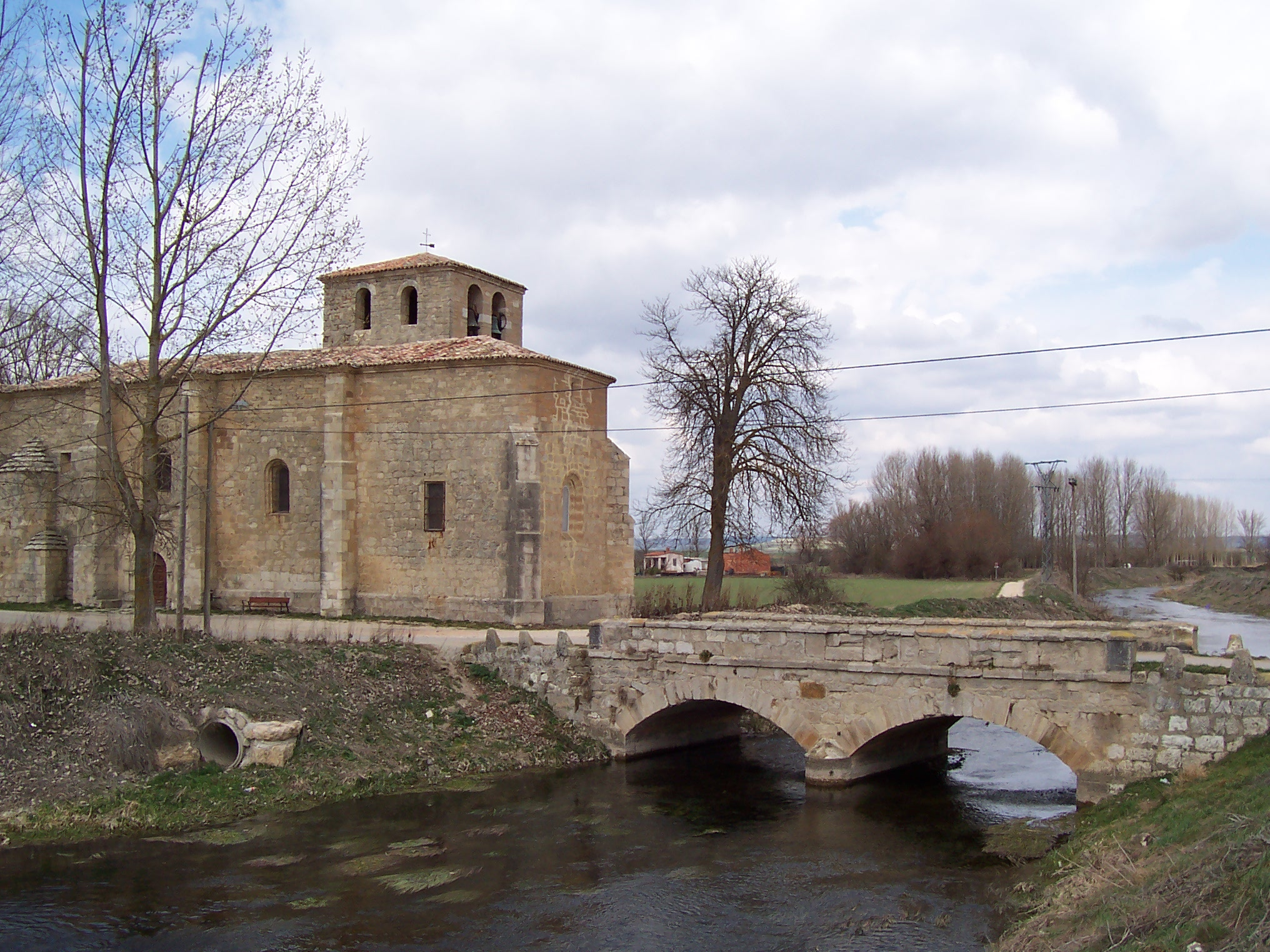
Church of Saint Eulalia of Mérida, in Quintanilla Vivar.

== People from Quintanilla Vivar ==
- Ireneo García Alonso (1923-2012) - Bishop of Albacete of the Roman Catholic Church.
