= Asidonia-Jerez Seminary =

Roman Catholic seminary in Jerez de la Frontera, Spain

Coordinates: 36°41′26″N 6°08′50″W

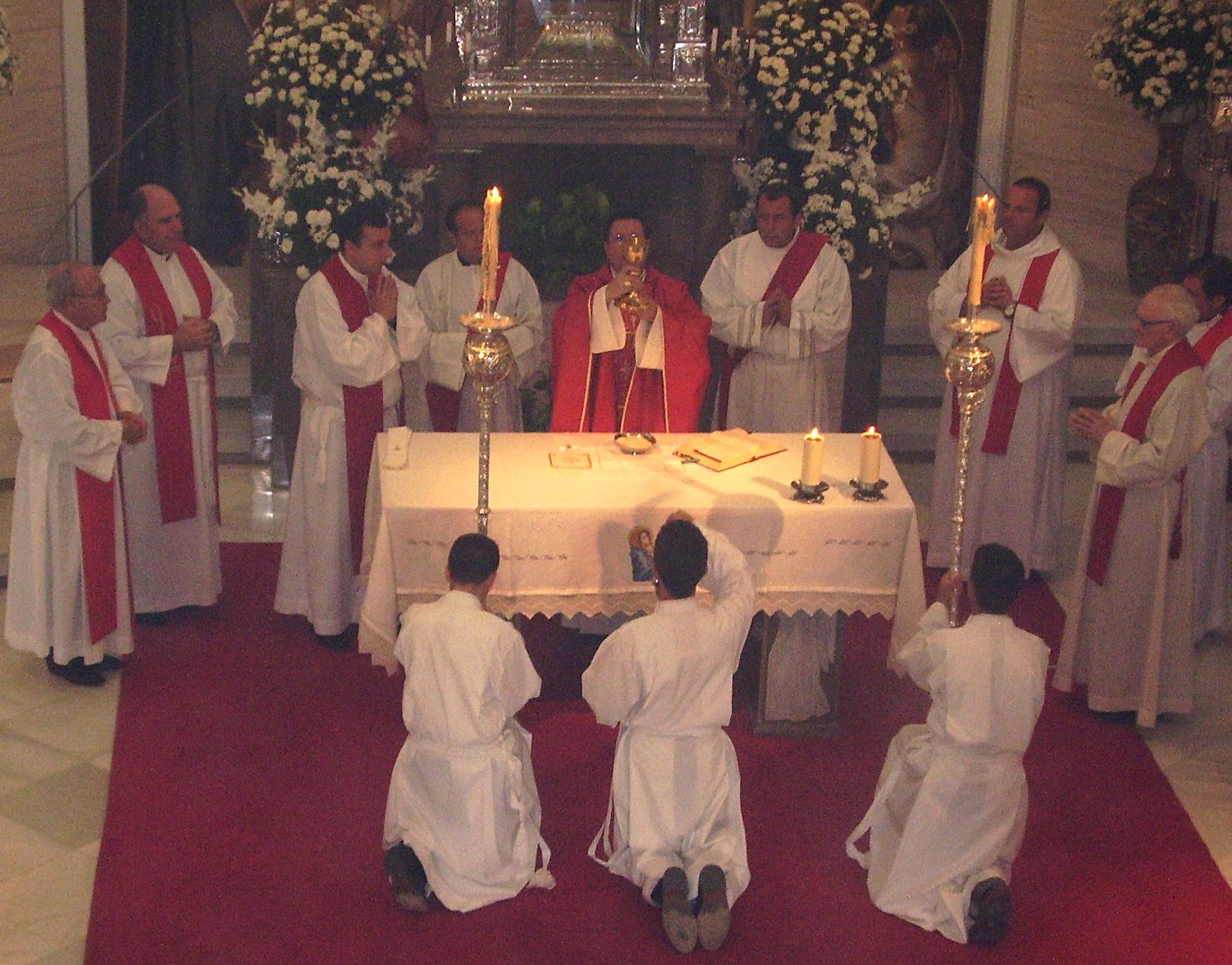
Asidonia-Jerez Seminary

Asidonia-Jerez seminary is a Roman Catholic seminary in Jerez de la Frontera, southern Spain, by the Asidonia-Jerez bishop. It was founded on 1985 by bishop Rafael Bellido Caro. Since 2007 the academic studies depend on the Pontifical University of Salamanca.

This seminary belongs to Diocese of Jerez de la Frontera, erected by a papal bull of Pope John Paul II in 1980.
