= Wouzee =

Streaming video platform

wouzee
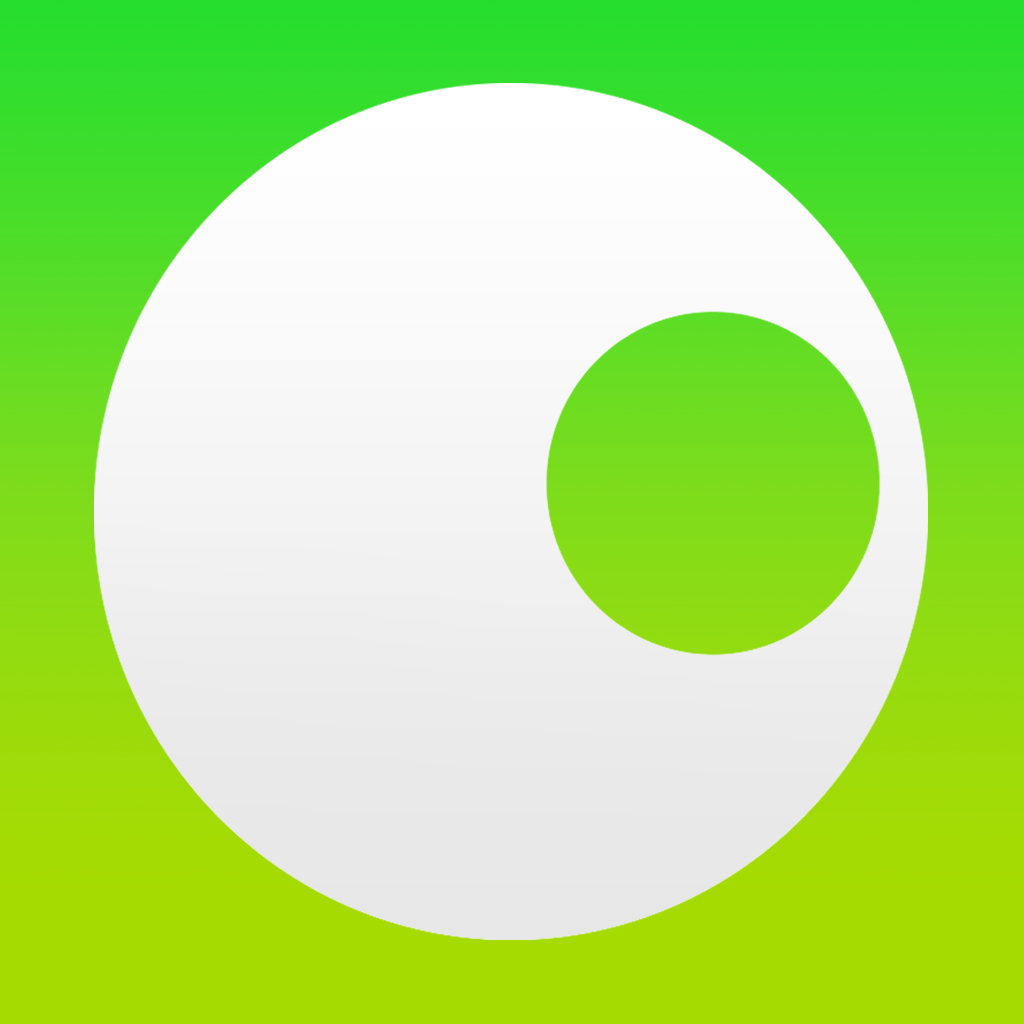
- Company type: Private
- Available in: English, Spanish
- Founded: 2014; Madrid, Spain
- Founder: Marcial Cuquerella
- Industry: Internet
- Services: Video streaming
- Website: wouzee.com
- Users: 20.000 (June 2014)
- Current status: Active

wouzee is an interactive broadcast platform for streaming video that allows users to visualize and share play and stream video using different devices video camera or a computer through Internet. The user produces, shares and consumes information actively. In addition to the free support, Wouzee offers a premium service through livestreaming event production.

Wouzee became known nationally when one of their users decided to upload a video in which Infanta Cristina stated on the Noos Case. afterwards, was published by the Spanish newspaper El Mundo.
