= Diocese of Albacete =

Catholic diocese in Spain

Coordinates: 38.9957°N 1.8560°W

Diocese of Albacete Dioecesis Albasitensis Diócesis de Albacete

Catholic
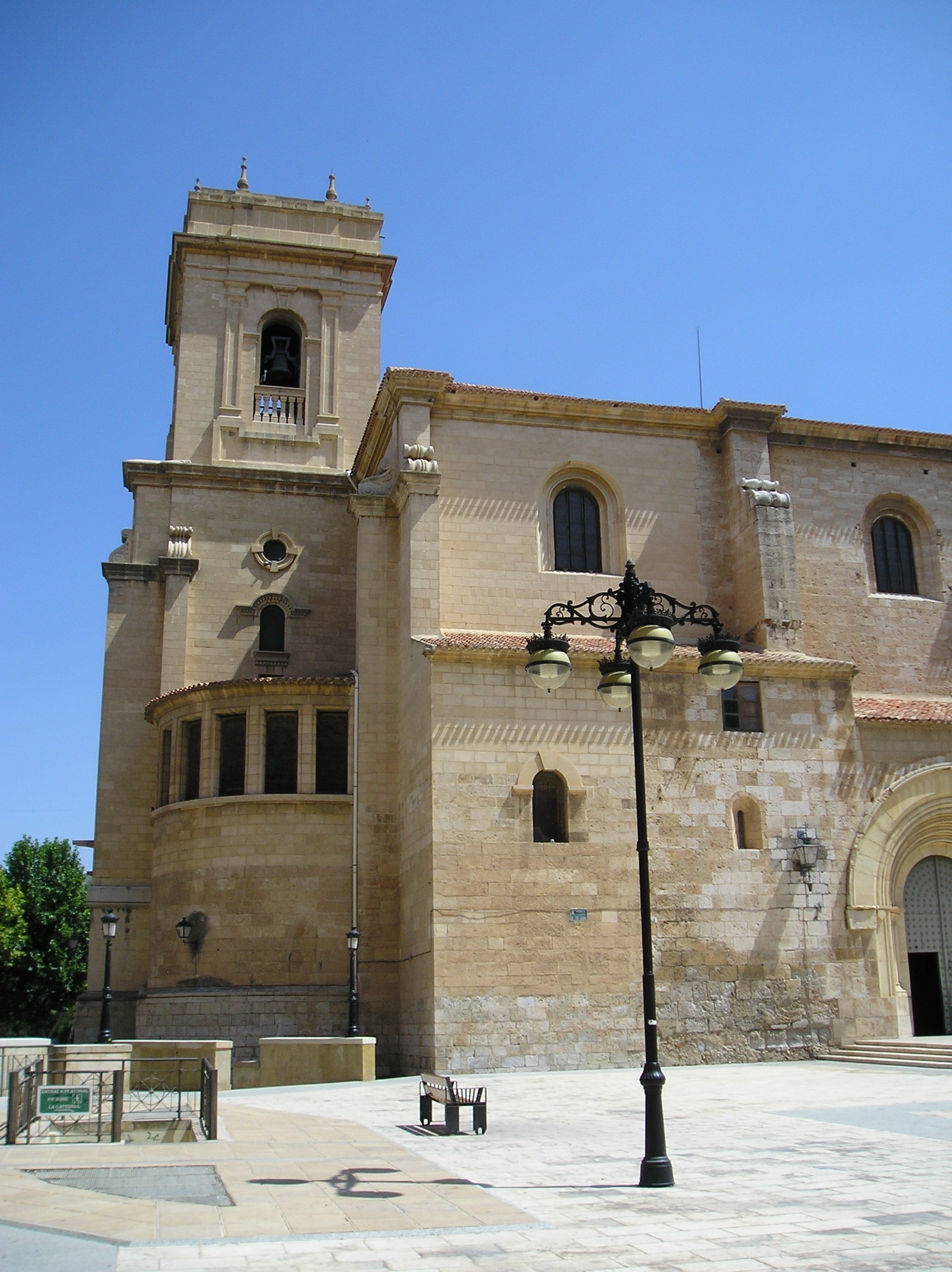
- Albacete Cathedral

Location
- Country: Spain
- Ecclesiastical province: Toledo
- Metropolitan: Toledo

Statistics
- Area: 14,926 km^{2} (5,763 sq mi)
- Population: Total; Catholics: (as of 2012); 402,318; 389,740 (96.9%)
- Parishes: 193

Information
- Denomination: Roman catholic
- Rite: Latin Rite
- Established: 2 November 1949
- Cathedral: Cathedral of St John the Baptist in Albacete

Current leadership
- Pope: Leo XIV
- Bishop: Ciriaco Benavente Mateos
- Metropolitan Archbishop: Braulio Rodríguez Plaza

Map

Website
- Website of the Diocese

The Diocese of Albacete (Latin: Dioecesis Albasitensis)) is a Latin Church diocese of the Catholic Church located in the city of Albacete in the ecclesiastical province of Toledo in Spain.

== History ==
- November 2, 1949: Established as Diocese of Albacete from the Diocese of Cartagena, Diocese of Cuenca and Diocese of Orihuela

== Leadership ==
- Bishops of Albacete (Roman rite)
  - Arturo Tabera Araoz, C.M.F. (13 May 1950 – 23 July 1968)
  - Bishop Ireneo García Alonso (7 December 1968 – 4 August 1980)
  - Bishop Victorio Oliver Domingo (27 May 1981 – 22 February 1996)
  - Bishop Francisco Cases Andreu (26 June 1996 – 26 November 2005)
  - Bishop Ciriaco Benavente Mateos (since 16 October 2006)

== See also ==
- Roman Catholicism in Spain

== Sources ==
- GCatholic.org
- Catholic Hierarchy
- Diocese website
