= Rafael Palmero Ramos =

Spanish Roman Catholic prelate (1936–2021)

- Bishop of Orihuela-Alicante
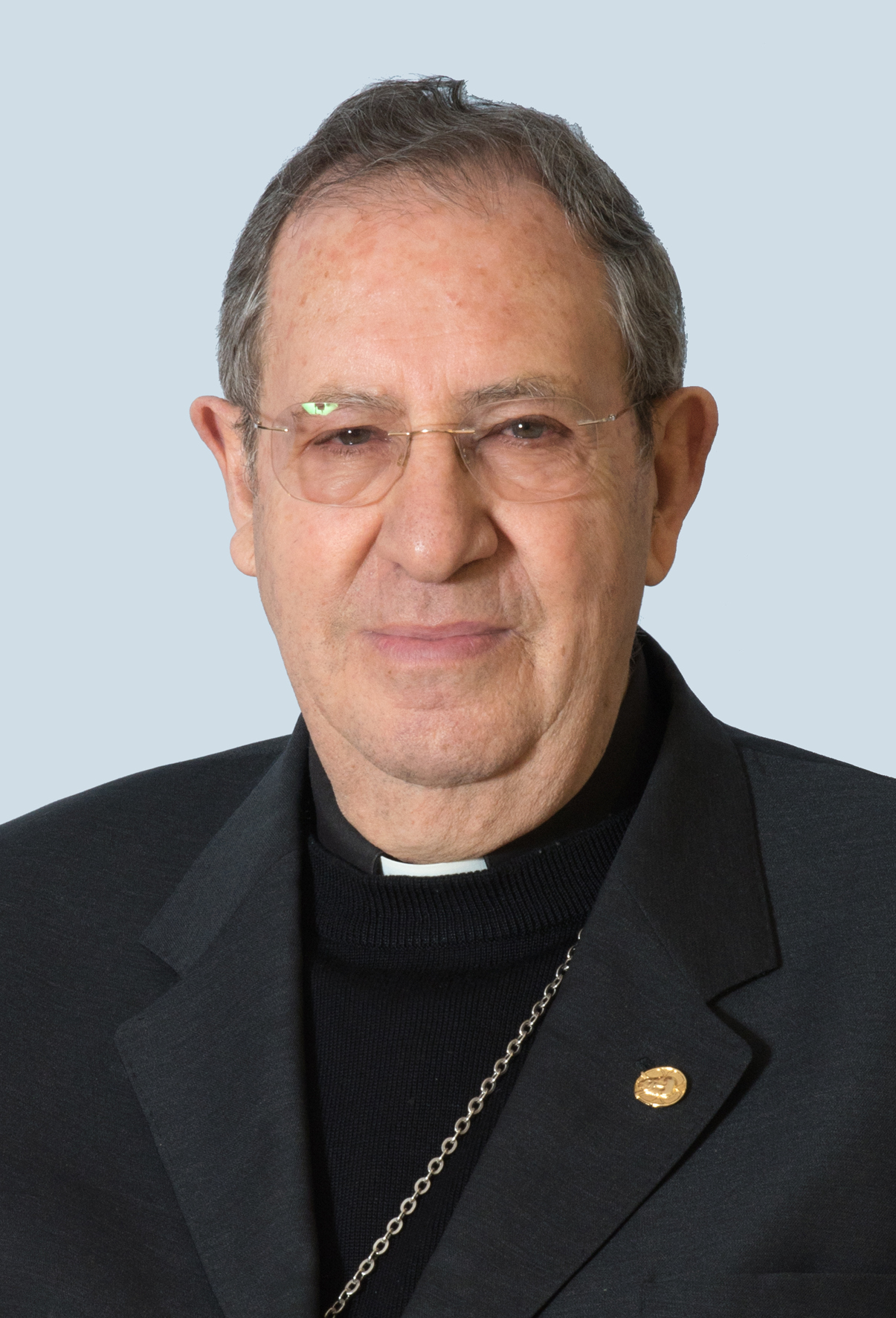
- Church: Catholic Church
- Diocese: Diocese of Orihuela-Alicante
- In office: 26 November 2005 – 27 July 2012
- Predecessor: Victorio Oliver Domingo
- Successor: Jesús Murgui
- Previous posts: Bishop of Palencia (1996-2005); Titular Bishop of Petina (1987-1996); Auxiliary Bishop of Toledo (1987-1996)

Orders
- Ordination: 13 September 1959
- Consecration: 24 January 1988 by Marcelo González Martín

Personal details
- Born: 27 July 1936 Morales de Rey, Province of Zamora, National Zone, Spanish State
- Died: 8 March 2021 (aged 84) Alicante, Valencian Community, Spain

Rafael Palmero Ramos (27 July 1936 – 8 March 2021) was a Spanish Roman Catholic prelate.

== Biography ==
He was auxiliary bishop of Toledo between 1987 and 1996, bishop of Palencia between 1996 and 2006 and of Orihuela-Alicante between 2006 and 2012.

He was infected with COVID-19 during the COVID-19 pandemic in Spain in January 2021 after an outbreak at the priests' residence in Alicante, from which he recovered, but it aggravated his cancer and he died on 8 March 2021.
