= Albacete Cathedral =

Cathedral in Albacete, Spain

- Cathedral of Saint John the Baptist
- Catedral de San Juan Bautista
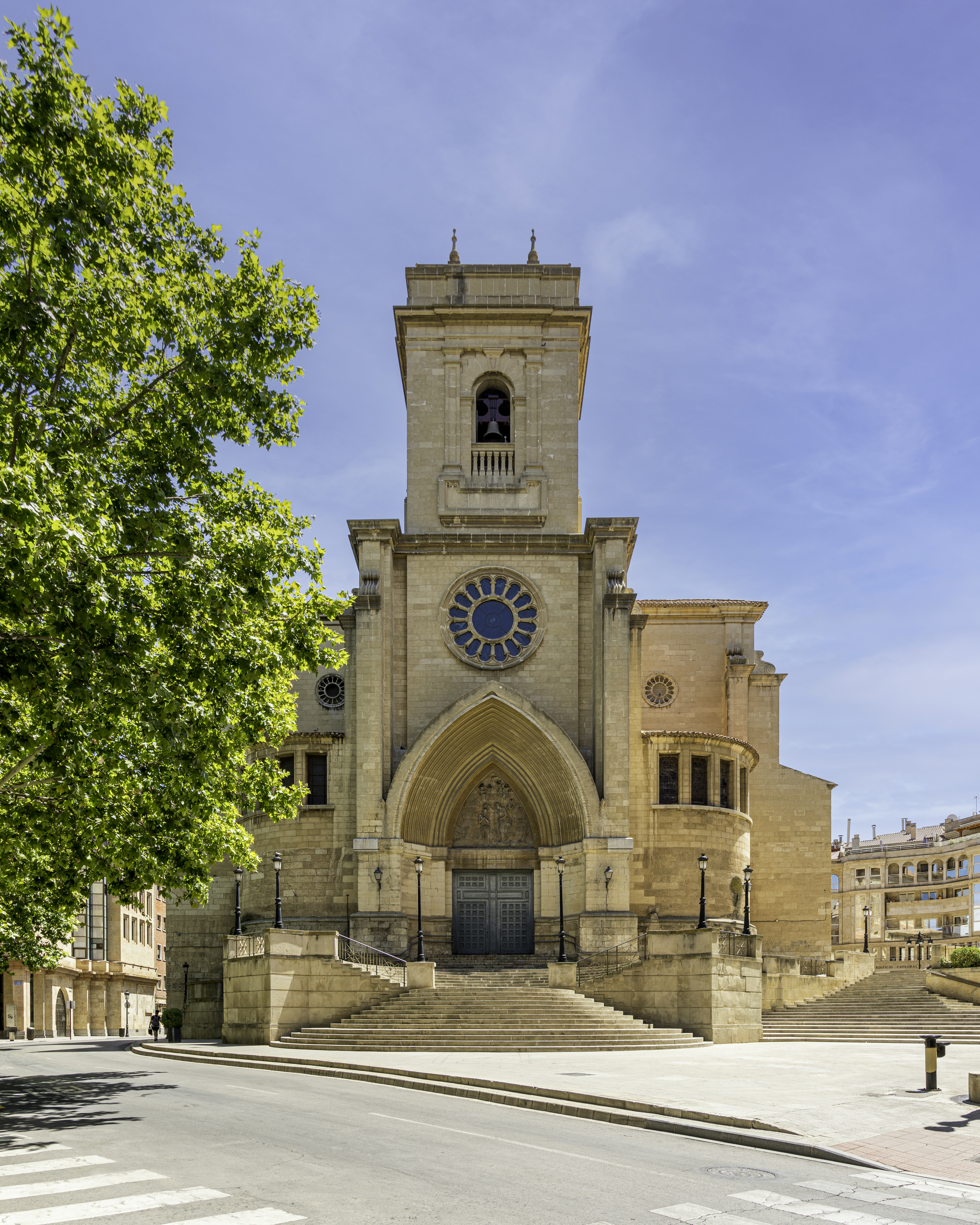
- West Gothic revival façade.
- Albacete Cathedral
- 38.995728°N 1.856202°W
- Location: Albacete
- Address: Plaza de la Catedral
- Country: Spain
- Denomination: Catholic

History
- Status: Cathedral
- Dedication: John the Baptist
- Dedicated: 5 May 1955

Architecture
- Style: Mudejar, Gothic Revival, Romanesque Revival
- Groundbreaking: 1515

Administration
- Metropolis: Toledo
- Diocese: Albacete

Clergy
- Bishop: Ángel Fernández Collado

Spanish Cultural Heritage
- Type: Non-movable
- Criteria: Monument
- Designated: 26 March 1982
- Reference no.: RI-51-0004621

The Cathedral of Saint John the Baptist (Spanish: Catedral de San Juan Bautista) is a Roman Catholic church located in Albacete, Spain. It was declared Bien de Interés Cultural in 1982.

== History ==
The church of San Juan was constructed in 1515 in place of a Mudéjar edifice. At this time, Albacete belonged to the Diocese of Cartagena. In the 16th century the previous Gothic vaults were demolished and replaced with the current Baroque ones. In 1936, during the Spanish Civil War its bells were melted down only to be replaced in 1947 by its current bells. It was also during this post war period, in 1949 when the principal facade was finished and the Diocese of Albacete was formed, elevating the church to cathedral status. In 1960 the lateral facade was finished in a Romanesque Revival style.
