= Ireneo García Alonso =

- Bishop of the Diocese of Albacete (emeritus)
- Church: Roman Catholic Church
- See: Roman Catholic Diocese of Albacete
- In office: 1968-1980
- Predecessor: Arturo Tabera Araoz
- Successor: Victorio Oliver Domingo

Orders
- Ordination: 27 March 1948

Personal details
- Born: 25 March 1923 Quintanilla Vivar, Spain
- Died: 4 June 2012 (aged 89) Toledo, Spain

Ireneo García Alonso (25 March 1923 – 4 June 2012) was a Spanish prelate of the Catholic Church.

García Alonso was born in Quintanilla Vivar, Spain and ordained a priest on 27 March 1948. García Alonso was appointed bishop of the Diocese of Albacete on 7 December 1968 and ordained a bishop on 25 January 1969. He resigned as bishop of Albacete on 4 August 1980. He died in Toledo on 4 June 2012, aged 89.

== See also ==
- Diocese of Albacete
