= Victorio Oliver Domingo =

Spanish Roman Catholic bishop (born 1929)

The Most Reverend Victorio Oliver Domingo
- Bishop Emeritus of Orihuela-Alicante
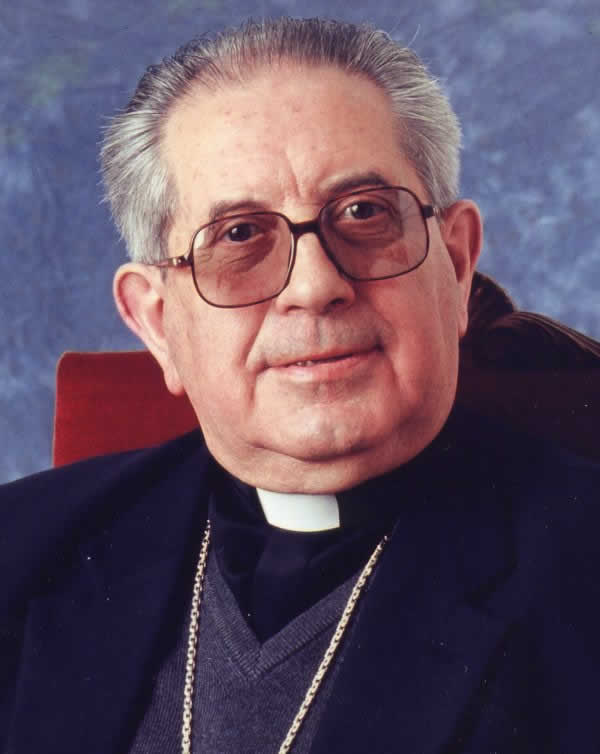
- Church: Catholic Church
- Diocese: Roman Catholic Diocese of Orihuela-Alicante
- Appointed: 22 February 1996
- Term ended: 26 November 2005
- Predecessor: Francisco Álvarez Martínez
- Successor: Rafael Palmero Ramos
- Other posts: Bishop of Albacete (1981–1996); Bishop of Tarazona (1976–1981)

Orders
- Ordination: 27 June 1954
- Consecration: 12 October 1972 by Vicente Enrique y Tarancón

Personal details
- Born: Victorio Oliver Domingo; 23 December 1929 (age 96) Mezquita de Jarque, Teruel, Spain
- Education: Pontifical Biblical Institute
- Motto: En el nombre del Señor
- Coat of arms

Victorio Oliver Domingo (born 23 December 1929) is a Spanish Roman Catholic prelate, who served as Bishop of Orihuela-Alicante from 1996 until his retirement in 2005. He previously served as Bishop of Tarazona and Bishop of Albacete.

== Early life and education ==
Victorio Oliver Domingo was born on 23 December 1929 in Mezquita de Jarque, in the province of Teruel, Spain. He completed his ecclesiastical studies in Spain and later pursued advanced studies in Sacred Scripture at the Pontifical Biblical Institute in Rome.

== Priesthood ==
Oliver Domingo was ordained a priest on 27 June 1954. He served in the Roman Catholic Diocese of Teruel and Albarracín as a seminary professor, prefect of discipline, and vice-rector. He was also a canon lectoral of the cathedral and held various pastoral and diocesan responsibilities, including involvement in Catholic Action.

== Episcopal ministry ==
On 5 September 1972, Pope Paul VI appointed him Titular bishop of Limisa and Auxiliary Bishop of Madrid. He received episcopal consecration on 12 October 1972 from Vicente Enrique y Tarancón, Archbishop of Madrid.

=== Bishop of Tarazona ===
Oliver Domingo was appointed Bishop of Tarazona on 20 December 1976 and took canonical possession of the diocese on 30 January 1977.

=== Bishop of Albacete ===
On 29 May 1981, Pope John Paul II appointed him Bishop of Albacete. During his tenure, he also served within the Spanish Episcopal Conference, notably as President of the Episcopal Commission for the Apostolate of the Laity.

=== Bishop of Orihuela-Alicante ===
Oliver Domingo was appointed Bishop of Orihuela-Alicante on 22 February 1996. He took possession of the diocese on 23 March 1996. His resignation was accepted by Pope Benedict XVI on 26 November 2005, upon reaching the age limit established by canon law.

== Later life ==
After his retirement, Oliver Domingo continued to reside in the province of Alicante. In 2019, a bronze bust honoring his episcopal ministry was inaugurated in Orihuela, the episcopal see of Orihuela-Alicsnte, in the Vega Baja del Segura shire in the Alicante province, commemorating and acknowledging his pastoral service and relationship with the local community.
