= Álvaro Delgado (journalist) =

Mexican writer and journalist

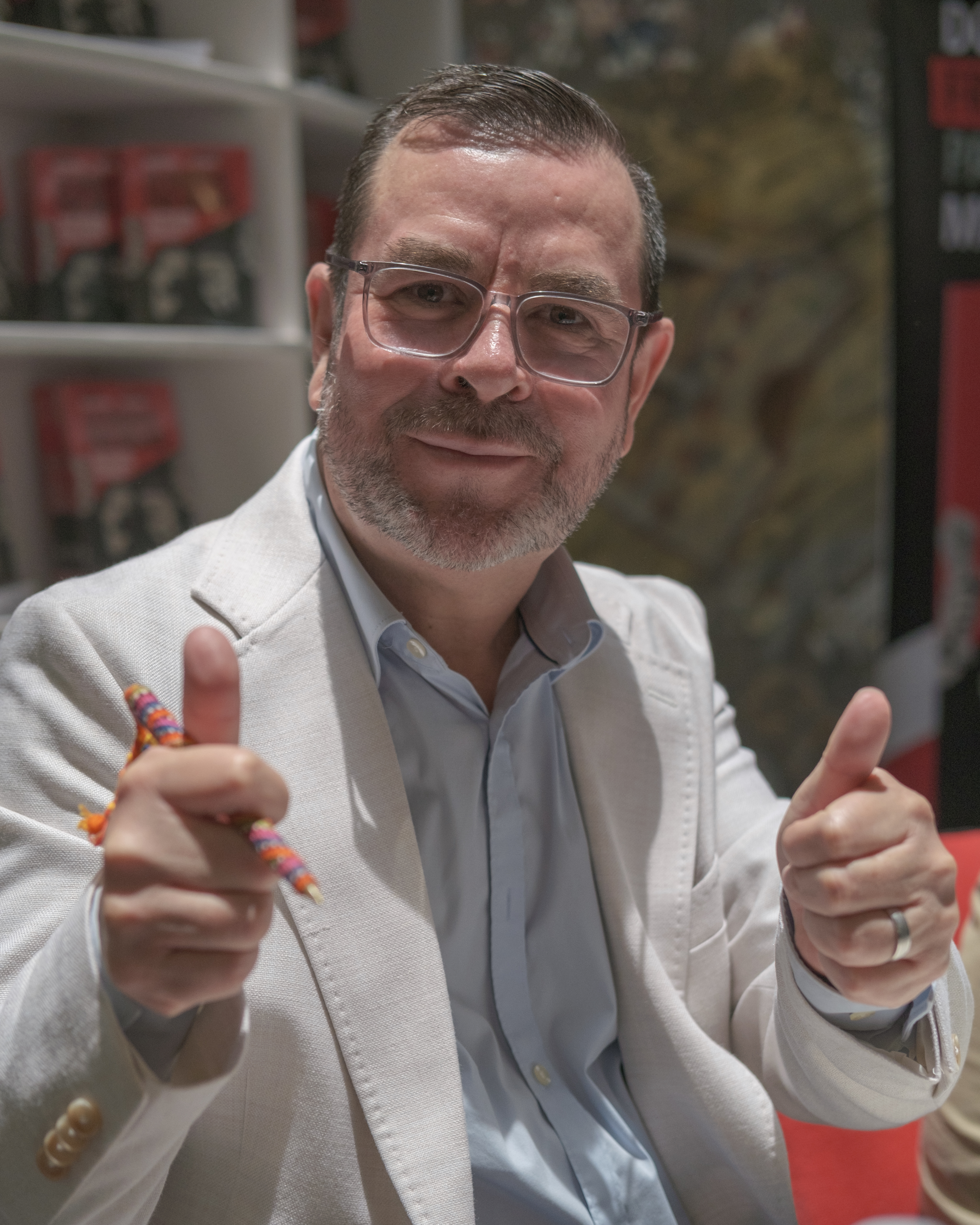
Álvaro Delgado

Álvaro Delgado Gómez (born 1966) is a Mexican political investigative journalist and author.

He studied journalism at the National Autonomous University of Mexico (UNAM) and has worked in the Mexican national newspapers El Nacional, El Universal, and El Financiero, as well as the political newsmagazine Proceso.

In 2003, he published the book El Yunque – La ultraderecha en el poder, the continuation of a series of articles for Proceso magazine in which he researched a secret Roman Catholic fascist organization called El Yunque, ("The Anvil"), active in Mexico since the 1950s, many of whose high-ranking members then held high positions in the PAN administration of President Vicente Fox. The book won him the Mexican national prize for journalism in 2003, but he also received several death threats.
