= Pimenio =

7th-century bishop

Pimenio, (Pymenius) was Bishop of Assidonia (Medina Sidonia). He participated in the Fourth Council of Toledo in AD 633 and sixth in the year 638, being represented by the priest Ubiliensio in the seventh council of Toledo 646. He devoted several churches, putting in them further relics of martyrs, what various inscriptions are preserved in the chapel of Saints in Medina Sidonia (year 630), in the Saint Ambrosio church Vejer de la Frontera (year 644), in Salpensa (near Utrera) of 648, and in Alcalá de los Gazules 662. He carried out substantial work of renewal in his diocese and his episcopate lasted at least 18 years from 629 until after 646.

He was buried in a monastery in the village of Aquis (Talavera de la Reina) where in the year 681 in honor of the Saint, the Visigoth king Wamba established the bishopric of aquense-eborense dependent of the pontifical chair of Merida.
