= Mezquita de Jarque =

- municipality
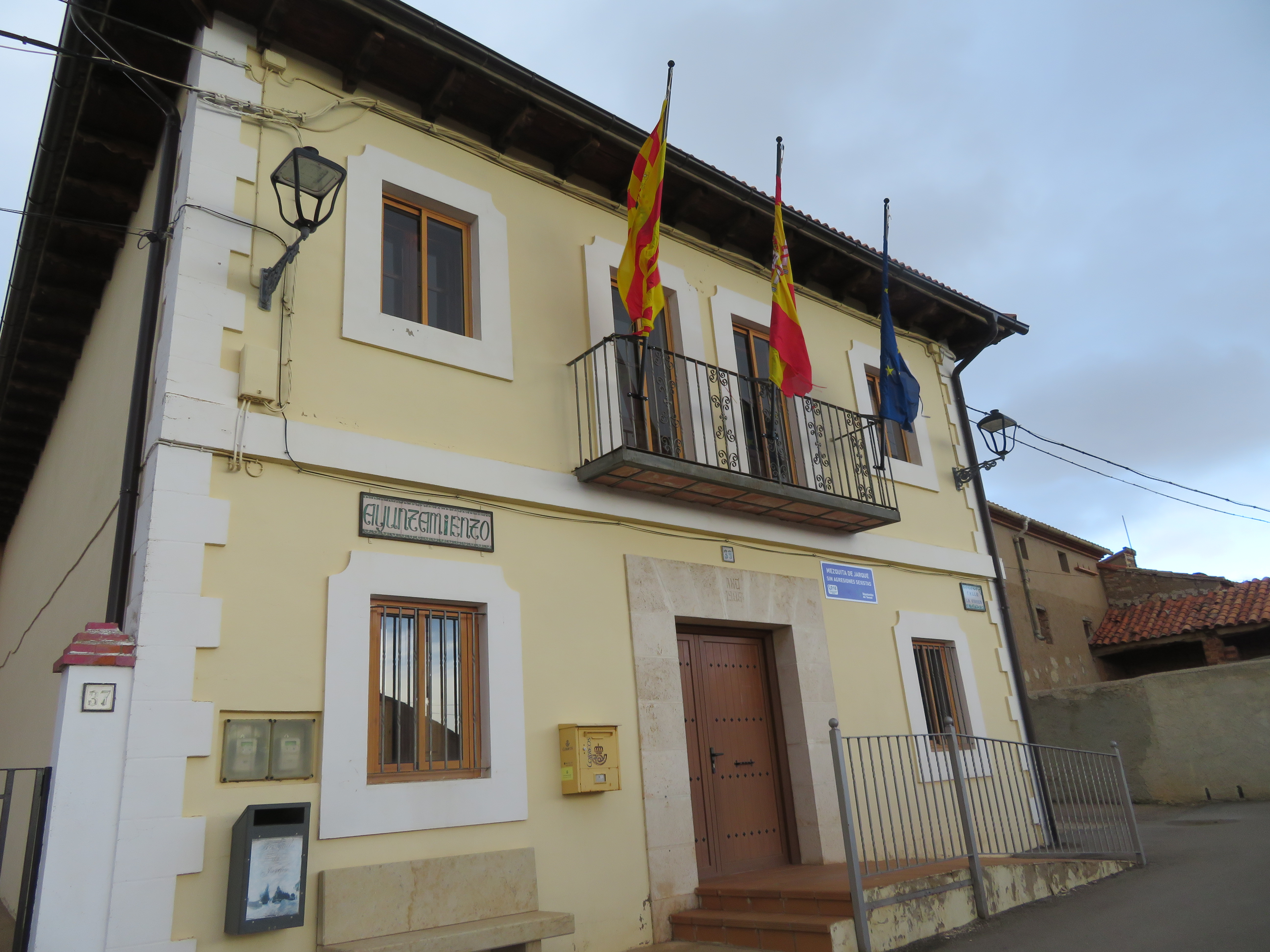
- Town hall

- Location within Spain
- Coordinates: 40°43′N 0°52′W
- Country: Spain
- Autonomous community: Aragon
- Province: Teruel

Area
  - Total: 31.14 km^{2} (12.02 sq mi)
- Elevation: 1,251 m (4,104 ft)

Population (2025-01-01)
  - Total: 83
  - Density: 2.7/km^{2} (6.9/sq mi)
- Time zone: UTC+1 (CET)
  - Summer (DST): UTC+2 (CEST)

Mezquita de Jarque is a municipality located in the province of Teruel, Aragon, Spain. According to the 2004 census (INE), the municipality has a population of 123 inhabitants. Mezquita lies approximately mid way between Teruel (the capital) to the west and Alcañiz to the east. The village hosts an annual street music festival 'Tamborile' in June each year. There is a constant drive to maintain the population which has suffered from a loss of mining in the region and from continued mechanization and economies of scale in agriculture. Mezquita is a 'go ahead' village which has welcomed investment in renewable energy in the village and surrounding area.

== See also ==
- List of municipalities in Teruel
