= Juan del Río Martín =

Catholic archbishop (1947–2021)

- Military Ordinary of Spain
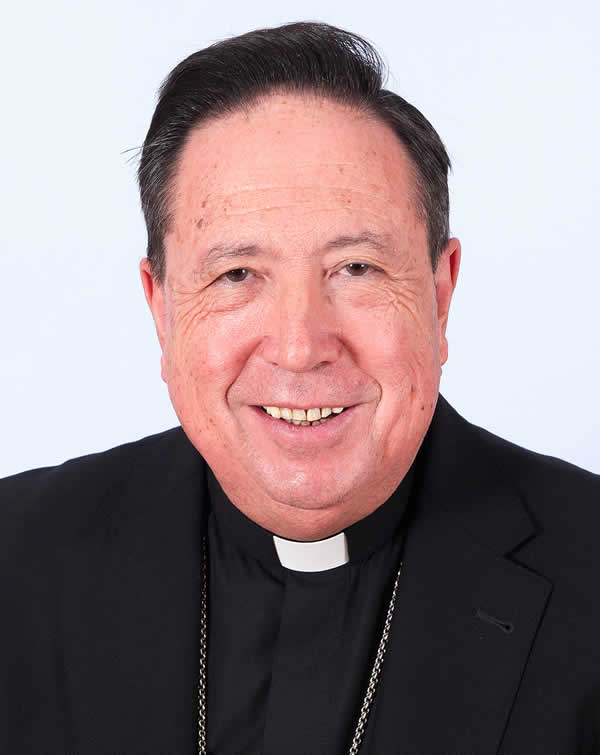
- Church: Catholic Church
- Appointed: 30 June 2008
- Term ended: 28 January 2021
- Predecessor: Francisco Pérez González
- Successor: Juan Antonio Aznárez Cobo
- Previous post: Bishop of Asidonia-Jerez (2000–2008)

Orders
- Ordination: 2 February 1974 by Leopoldo Eijo y Garay
- Consecration: 23 September 2000 by Manuel Monteiro de Castro

Personal details
- Born: Juan del Río Martín; 14 October 1947 Ayamonte, Spain
- Died: 28 January 2021 (aged 73) Madrid, Spain
- Education: Pontifical Gregorian University; University of Granada
- Motto: Opus Iustitiae Pax
- Coat of arms

Juan del Río Martín (14 October 1947 – 28 January 2021) was a Spanish archbishop, Military Ordinary of Spain from 2008 until his death in 2021.

== Career ==
In 1964 he obtained the Baccalaureate in his hometown. He entered the Seminary of Seville in 1965, where he would study Philosophy and Theology until 1973. In 1975 he obtained the title of social graduate from the University of Granada. Sent to Rome in 1979, he received a degree in Dogmatic Theology from the Pontifical Gregorian University, subsequently obtaining a Ph.D. degree in the same specialty with a thesis on the ecclesiology of Saint John of Avila.

Ordained priest on 2 February 1974 in Seville, he developed his entire pastoral ministry in the Archdiocese of Seville. On 29 June 2000, he was appointed second bishop of the Diocese of Asidonia-Jerez by John Paul II. His consecration was carried out by the Apostolic Nuncio in Spain Manuel Monteiro de Castro on 23 September of that year. Benedict XVI appointed him Military Ordinary of Spain on 30 June 2008.

== Death ==
On 21 January 2021, he was admitted to the Gómez Ulla Military Hospital in Madrid after contracting COVID-19 during the COVID-19 pandemic in Spain. Although during the first days it was reported that he was recovering, soon his condition worsened and he succumbed to the disease on 27 January.
