= José Rico Pavés =

Spanish Roman Catholic bishop

- Bishop
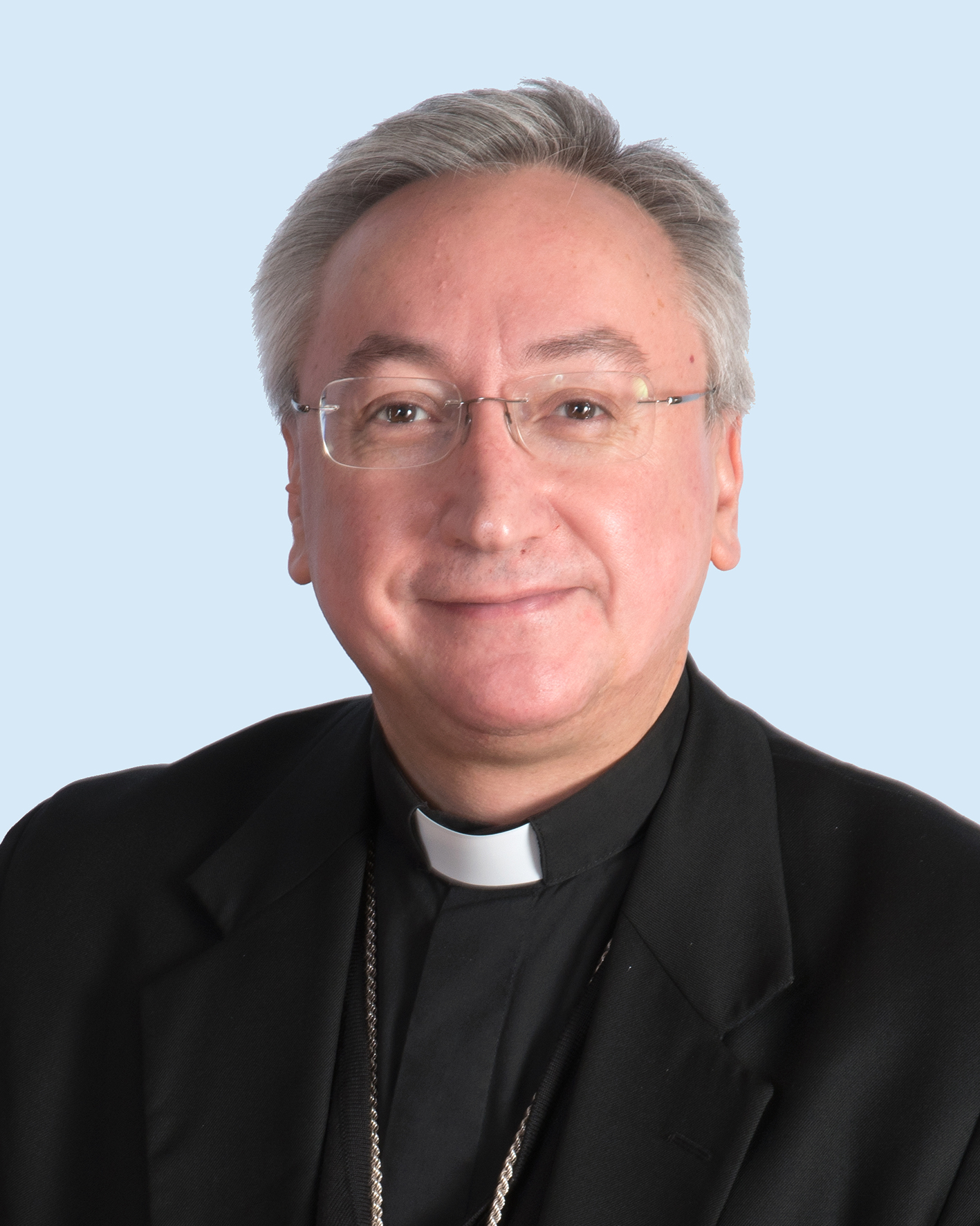
- Church: Catholic Church
- Diocese: Jerez de la Frontera
- Appointed: 6 July 2012

Orders
- Ordination: 11 October 1991 by Cardinal Marcelo González Martín
- Consecration: 21 September 2012 by Bishop Joaquín María López de Andújar y Cánovas del Castillo

Personal details
- Born: 9 October 1966 (age 58); Granada, Spain

- Coat of arms

José Rico Pavés (9 October 1966) is a Spanish Catholic clergyman, and since 9 June 2021 the Bishop of Jerez de la Frontera.

== Biography ==
He was born in Granada on 9 October 1966.

=== Priesthood and ministry ===
He completed his ecclesiastical studies in Toledo from 1985 to 1992, and continued his studies between 1987 and 1989, attending a course in spirituality and another in classical languages. During that time, he translated two patristic works of St. Gregory the Great for Editorial Ciudad Nueva, a publishing house. He continued his studies at the Pontifical Gregorian University in Rome where he obtained a licentiate in systematic theology in 1994 and a degree in patristics in 1998, obtaining a medal for his thesis.

On 11 October 1992, he was ordained a priest for the archdiocese of Toledo by Cardinal Marcelo González Martín. He was later a coadjutor vicar in a parish in Granada; an adjunct professor at the Pontifical Gregorian University from 1996 to 1998; served as a theology professor and faculty in several universities; worked for the parish of San Tommaso in Toledo from 2001 to 2012; director of the secretariat for the faith and ecumenism of the archdiocese of Toledo from 2005 to 2012 and director of a theological institute from 2008 to 2012.

He was also a visiting professor at the Leo XIII Institute of Social Doctrine of the Church in Madrid and at the Faculty of Theology of the University of Navarre and a member of the Association of Patrologists of the East and West of the Pro Oriente Foundation. based in Vienna, from 2001 to 2012.

=== Episcopal ministry ===
On 6 July 2012, Pope Benedict XVI appointed him auxiliary bishop of Getafe and titular bishop of Mentesa. He received episcopal ordination on the following 21 September in the basilica of Cerro de los Ángeles by the bishop of Getafe Joaquín María López de Andújar y Cánovas del Castillo, co-consecrating Cardinal Antonio María Rouco Varela, metropolitan archbishop of Madrid, and the metropolitan archbishop of ToledoBraulio Rodríguez Plaza.

On 9 June 2021, Pope Francis appointed him bishop of Jerez de la Frontera. He took control of the diocese on the following 31 July.

Within the Spanish Episcopal Conference, he has been head of the catechumenate of the commission for evangelism since March 2020 and head of the same commission since April 2022. Previously he was a member of the commission for the doctrine of the faith from 2012 to 2014, a member of the subcommittee for catechesis from 2014 to 2017, and a member of the commission for education and catechesis from 2014 to 2020.

== Works ==
- Escatologia Cristiana: Para comprender que hay tras la muerte. Introducción teológica. Madrid: UCAM-AEDOS. 2002. ISBN 978-84-953-8318-1.
- Terrorismo y nacionalismo: comentario a la instrucción pastoral de la Conferencia Episcopal Española "Valoración moral del terrorismo en España, de sus causas y de sus consecuencias". Madrid: Biblioteca de Autores Cristianos. 2005. p. 560. ISBN 978-84-791-4768-6.
- Los sacramentos de la iniciación cristiana: introducción teológica a los sacramentos del Bautismo, Confirmación y Eucaristía. Madrid: I.T. San Ildefonso. 2006. ISBN 978-84-934-2539-5.
- La fe de los sencillos. Madrid: Biblioteca de Autores Cristianos. 2012. ISBN 978-84-220-1618-2.
- con Yónatan Melo Pereira, José Miguel Rodríguez García, Juan Cerezo Soler e Juan Salvador Turmo (2015). Misterio de comunión en el amor: Trinidad. Edice Editorial. p. 492. ISBN 978-8471418548.
- con Yónatan Melo Pereira, José Miguel Rodríguez García e Juan Cerezo Soler (2015). ¡Tú eres el Mesías, el Hijo del Dios vivo!: Cristología. Editorial Edice. p. 720. ISBN 978-8471418531.
- Cristología y soteriología. Introducción teológica al misterio de Jesucristo. Madrid: Biblioteca de Autores Cristianos. 2016. p. 2012. ISBN 978-84-220-1827-8.
- Origen y desarrollo del Catecumenado en la antigüedad cristiana. Edice Editorial. 2018. p. 268. ISBN 978-8471419057.
