= Joaquín María López de Andújar y Cánovas del Castillo =

2º Bishop of Getafe

His Excellence Joaquín María López de Andújar y Cánovas del Castillo
- Bishop of Getafe
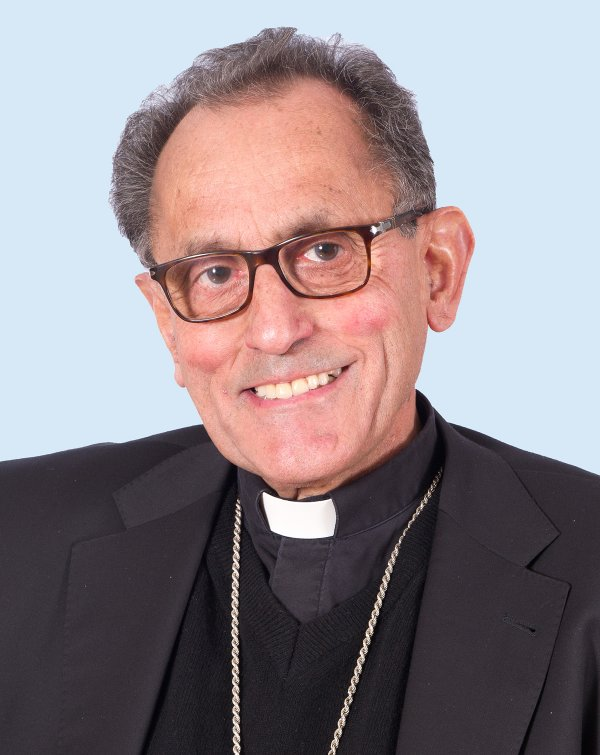
- Diocese: Getafe
- Appointed: 19 December 2004
- Term ended: 28
- Predecessor: Francisco José Pérez y Fernández-Golfín
- Previous post: Auxiliar Bishop of Getafe (2001-2004)

Orders
- Ordination: 30 November 1968 by Casimiro Morcillo González
- Consecration: 6 May 2001 by Francisco José Pérez y Fernández-Golfín

Personal details
- Born: Joaquín María López de Andújar y Cánovas del Castillo; 13 September 1942 (age 84) Madrid, Spain
- Denomination: Roman Catholicism
- Motto: Veritatem facientes in caritate
- Coat of arms

Styles of Joaquin Maria Lopez de Andujar y Canovas del Castillo
- Reference style: His Excellence
- Spoken style: Your Excellence
- Religious style: Bishop

Joaquín María López de Andújar y Cánovas del Castillo (born 13 September 1942) is a Spanish prelate of the Catholic Church. He previously served as the bishop of Getafe from 2004 to 2017.

== Biography ==
Joaquín María was born on Madrid on 13 September 1942, the son of Joaquín López de Andújar y Gil de Arana, and his wife Isabel Cánovas del Castillo y Teresa. He is the great-grand-nephew of Antonio Cánovas del Castillo, who served six terms as Prime Minister of Spain. He graduated in Law at the Complutense University of Madrid, and later studied at the Seminario Conciliar de Madrid and was ordained as a priest on 30 November 1968.

His first post as a priest was at the Parish of the Ascension of Our Lady, in Colmenar Viejo. In 1969, he moved to the Parish of Saint Mary, as parish vicar. In 1976, he became the parish priest of the Parish of Our Lady of Africa in Madrid; and two years later he was chosen to be the Archpriest of San Roque. In 1984 he became the Episcopal Vicar of the Fifth Vicarage of Madrid, where he stayed until the Archdiocese of Madrid-Alcalá was split in 1991, when he became the General Vicar of the Diocese of Getafe.

He was ordained as a bishop on 6 May 2001. After the passing of his predecessor Francisco José Pérez y Fernández-Golfín on 24 February 2004, he was chosen by the Colegio de Consultores Administrador diocesano the next day to serve as Bishop of Getafe, and was appointed on 29 October 2004. Fr. Joaquín María focused on increasing youth participation during his time as head of his diocese, including an annual tradition of providing buses for children from his diocese to go on pilgrimage to Guadalupe, and increasing his diocese's social media presence, to make religion feel more contemporary and accessible to young people.

He resigned when becoming 75 years old, as regulated by the Canon law of the Catholic Church, and was succeeded by Ginés Ramón García Beltrán, the then-Bishop of Guadix, Granada. He took a post as an Apostolic administrator until 24 February 2019, when he retired to the chaplains' convent in La Aldehuela.
