= White Towns of Andalusia =

Series of whitewashed towns in southern Spain

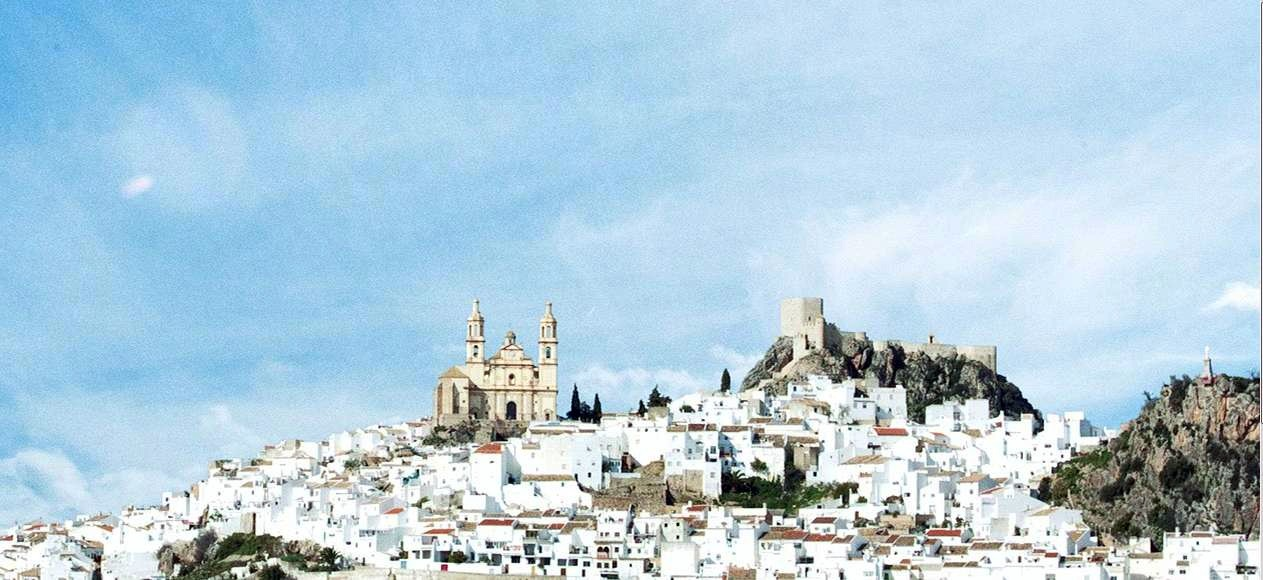
Olvera

Vejer de la Frontera

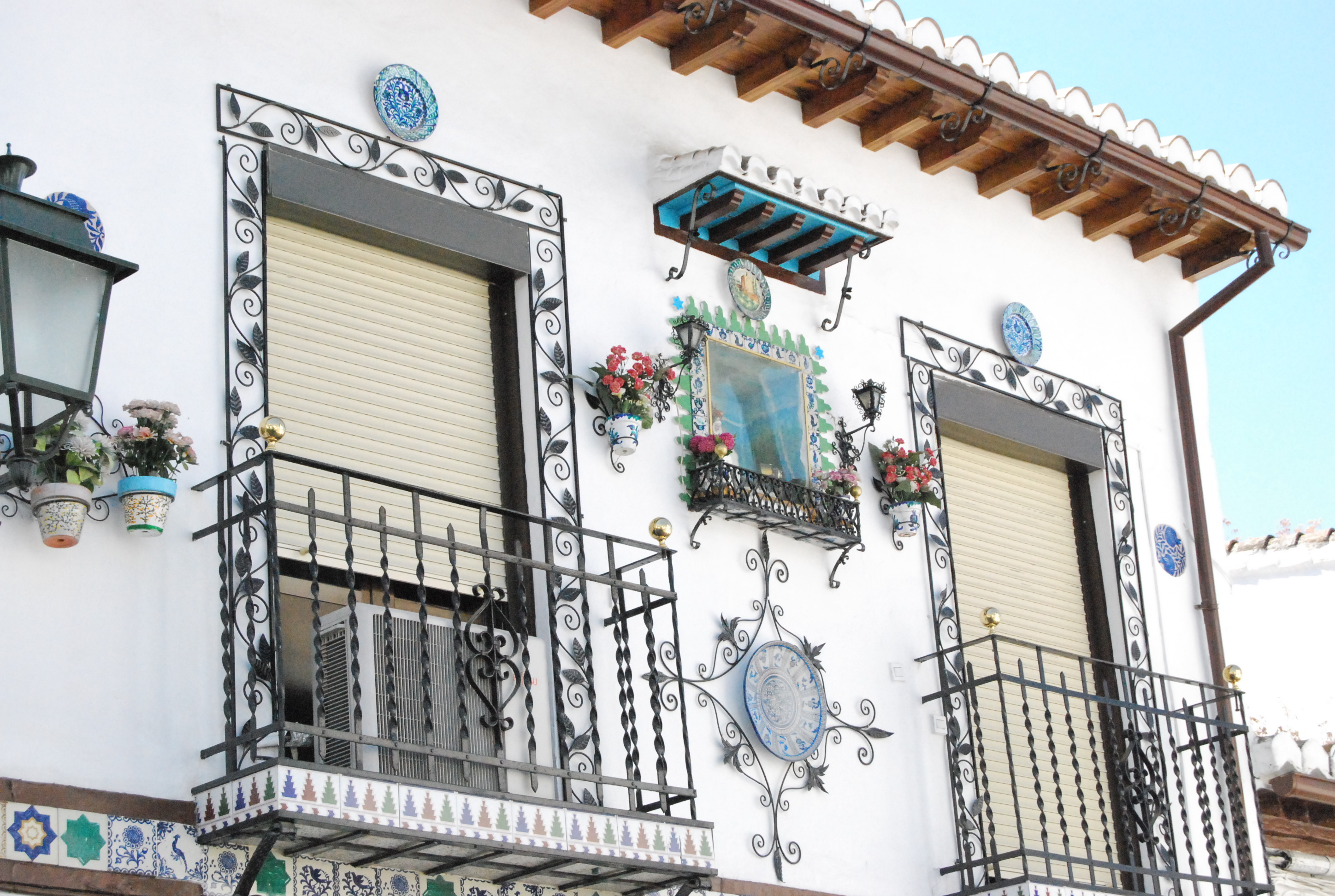
Typical house in the province of Granada.

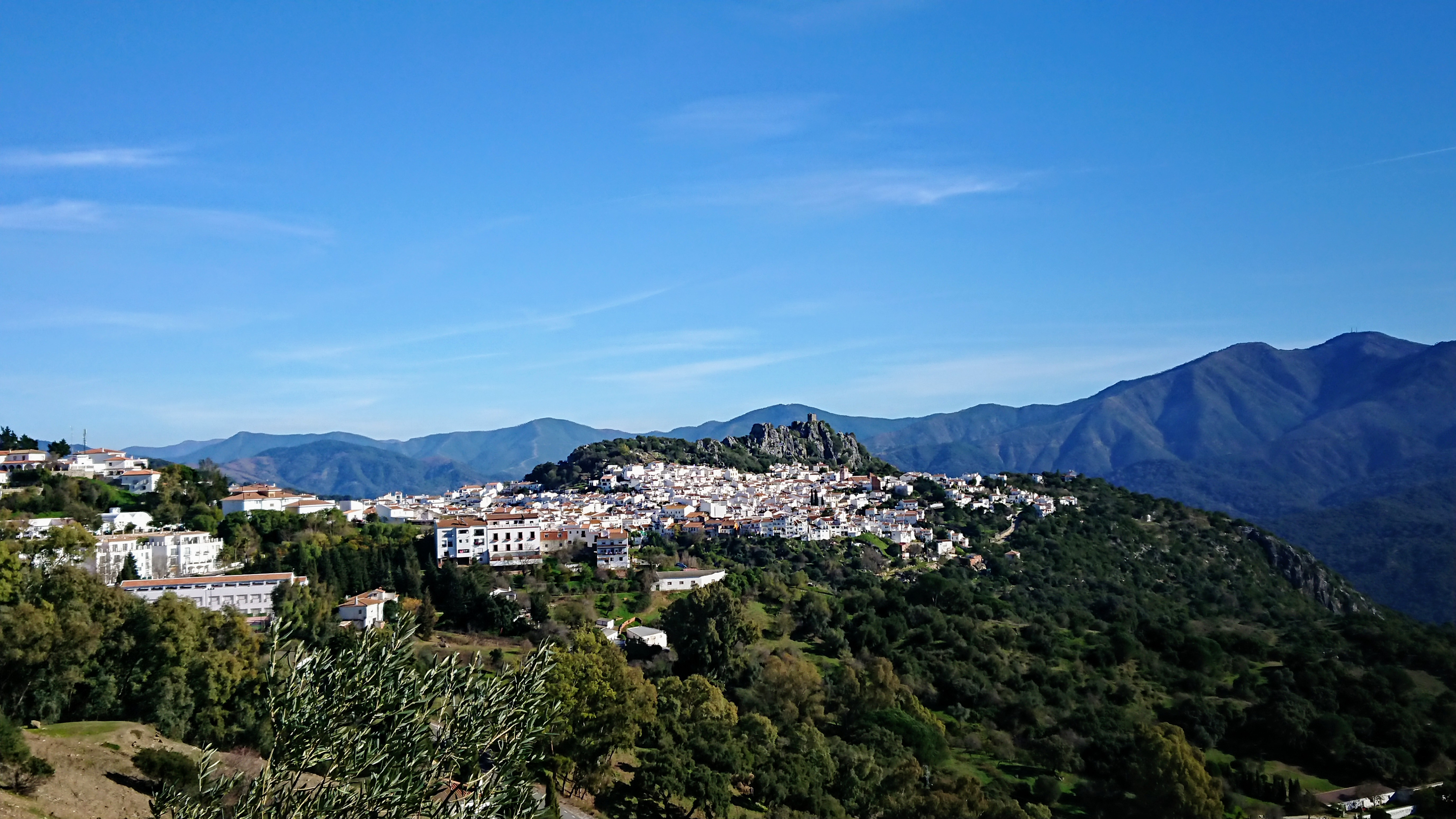
Gaucín

The White Towns of Andalusia, or Pueblos Blancos, are a series of whitewashed towns and large villages in the northern part of the provinces of Cádiz and Málaga in southern Spain, mostly within the Sierra de Grazalema Natural Park.

== History and description ==
The area has been settled since prehistoric times, and some of the local caves have ancient rock paintings. Iberian people, Roman, Visigoths and Berbers are some of the settlers before the Modern Era that left their print. It was precisely during Roman times that whitewashing was introduced, but it was later during the pandemic plague waves during 14th and later centuries when whitewashing exterior but also interior walls of houses and churches - the latter often visited by disease-affected inhabitants - became predominant. These villages punctuate or are close to natural parks in the south of the Iberian Peninsula, including Sierra de Grazalema Natural Park that is listed as a biosphere reserve and is the highest rainfall area in Spain, or Los Alcornocales Natural Park with its cork oak protected landscape.

All of the villages are characterised by whitewashed walls and red or brown tiled roofs. They also commonly present narrow alleyways, steep hills, lookouts, and town squares with a church and town hall. Often local institutions manage archeological museums with Roman or Arab artifacts, as well as others dedicated to local customs, crafts or trades.

== Villages and routes ==
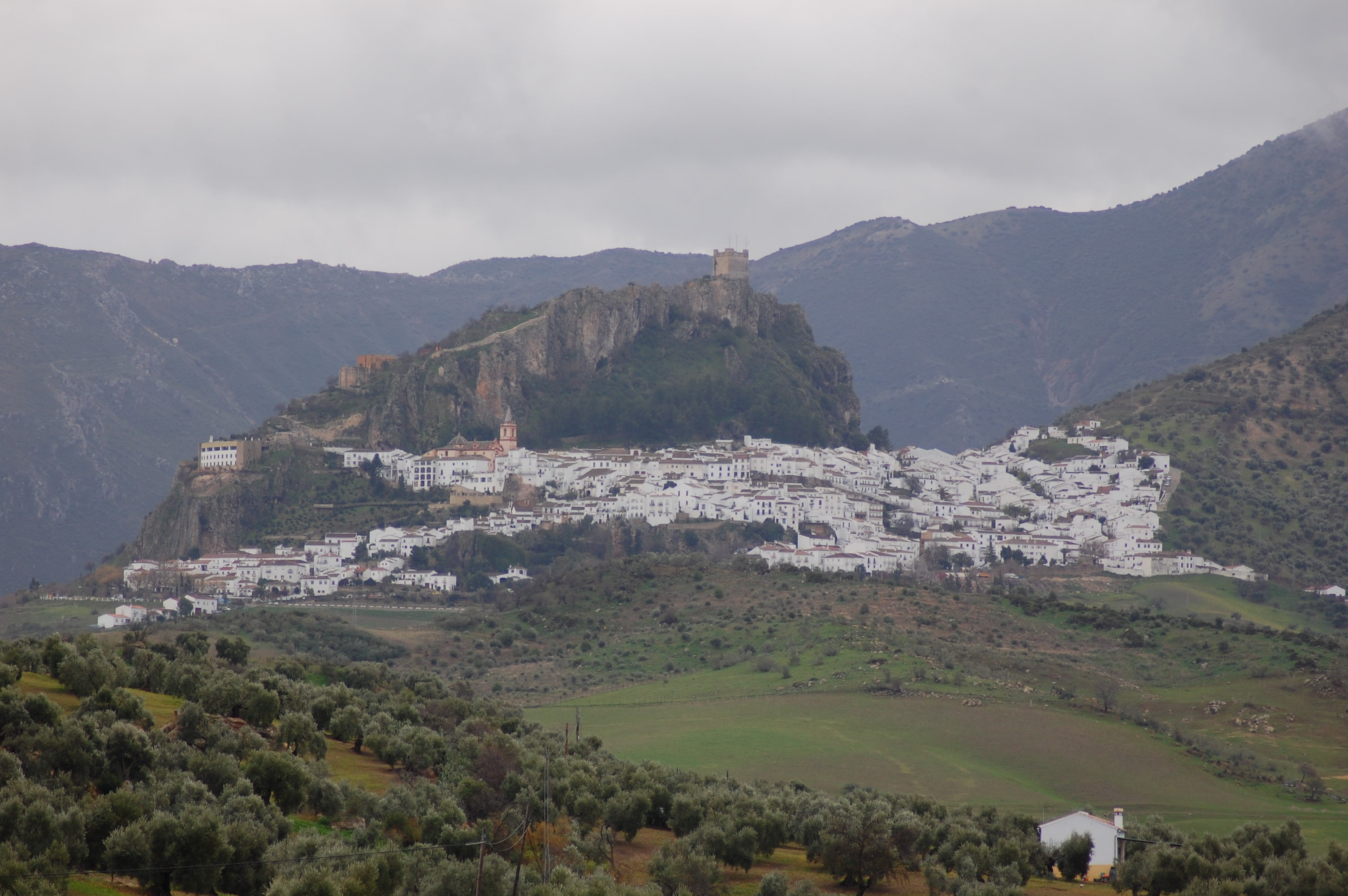
Zahara de la Sierra

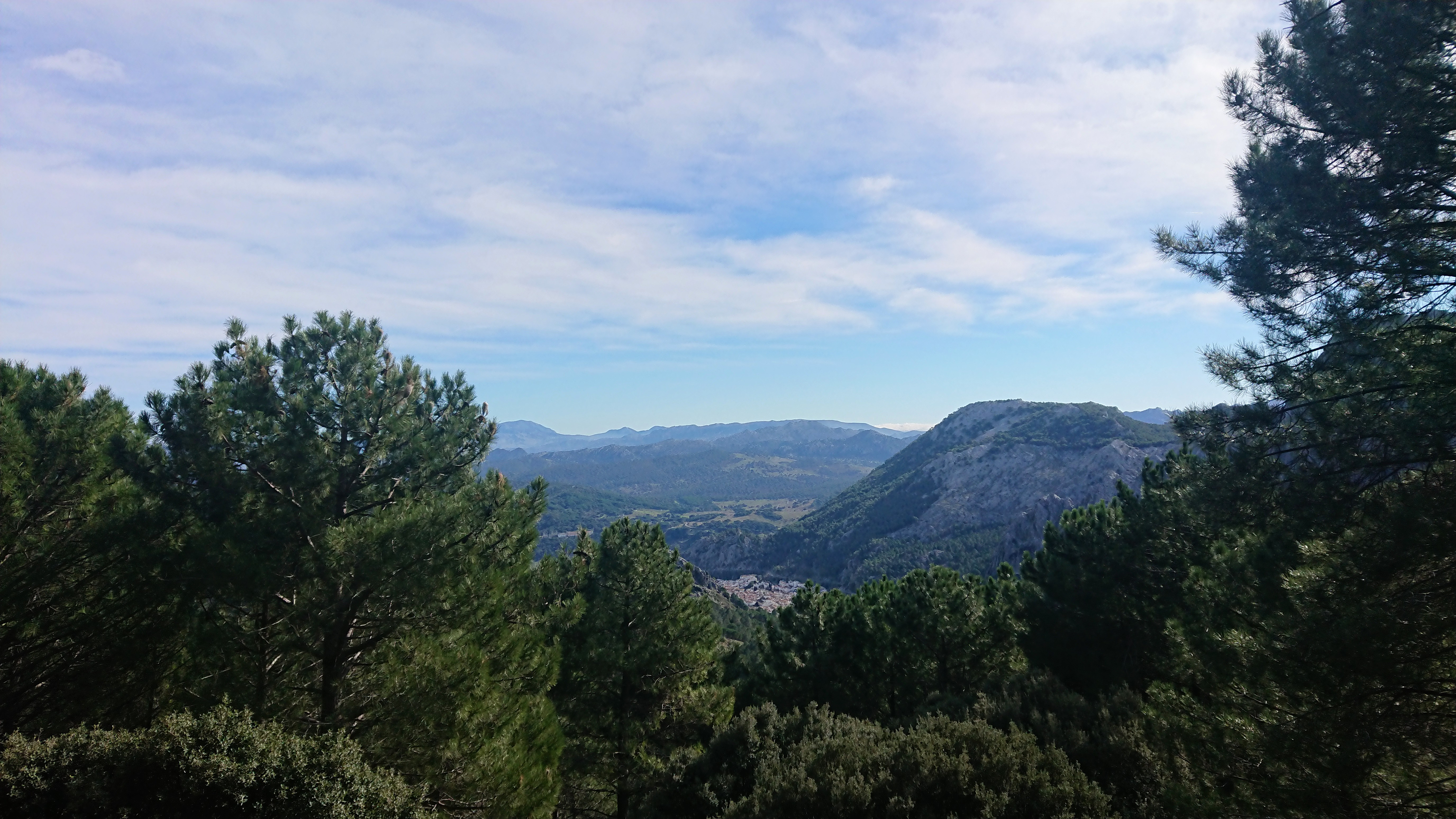
Grazalema

There are proposed routes to visit some of the villages. The better known ones are those close to Ronda (Serranía de Ronda comarca, province of Málaga) and Arcos de la Frontera (Sierra de Cádiz comarca, Province of Cádiz).

Ronda's White Towns route

- Ronda, including the ancient Roman settlement of Acinipo archeological site.
- Setenil de las Bodegas, Sierra de Cádiz comarca; some parts of the village use the rocky mountains as walls and roof of the houses.
- Torre Alháquime, Sierra de Cádiz comarca
- Olvera, Sierra de Cádiz comarca
- Algodonales, Sierra de Cádiz comarca; 16th-century town with some Roman ruins
- Zahara de la Sierra, Sierra de Cádiz comarca; it is in the Sierra de Grazalema Natural Park next to a reservoir.
- Grazalema, Sierra de Cádiz comarca
- Benaocaz, Sierra de Cádiz comarca; small village with a fortress
- Cartajima, Serranía de Ronda comarca, province of Málaga
- Canillas de Albaida, Axarquía comarca, Province of Málaga; its name says of its whiteness in Arabic.

Arcos de la Frontera's White Towns route

- Alcalá de los Gazules, La Janda comarca, province of Cádiz
- Medina Sidonia, La Janda comarca, province of Cádiz; including the Roman settlement of Asido.
- Arcos de la Frontera, Sierra de Cádiz comarca; perched on a cliff with Baroque churches.
- Bornos and Villamartín, Sierra de Cádiz comarca; reservoir, Roman ruins
- Ubrique, Sierra de Cádiz comarca; largest of the white towns, high quality leather crafts among other features (as of 2023, it is the world’s largest leather bag producer and exporter).
- Casares, Costa del Sol Occidental comarca, province of Málaga
- Jimena de la Frontera, Campo de Gibraltar comarca, province of Cádiz
- Castellar de la Frontera, Campo de Gibraltar comarca, province of Cádiz

Other villages and places to visit

- Mijas Pueblo (town center of Mijas), Málaga comarca, province of Málaga; Burro Taxi, Old Cathedral; typical Spanish white village
- Mojacar, Levante Almeriense comarca, province of Almeria; Mountain village and beach village, both white villages
- Garganta Verde and Ermita de la Garganta; caves with stalactites and stalagmites
- Puerto de las Palomas, Sierra de Cádiz comarca; mountain pass with panoramic views
- Villaluenga del Rosario, Sierra de Cádiz comarca; highest of the white towns
- Benamahoma, Grazalema municipio, Sierra de Cádiz comarca; white village, includes the source of Majaceite river
- El Bosque, Sierra de Cádiz comarca;white village, trout fishing and hang gliding.
- Prado del Rey, Sierra de Cádiz comarca; a more modern white village
- Puerto Serrano, Sierra de Cádiz comarca; a quiet white village
- El Gastor, Sierra de Cádiz comarca; Balcón de los Pueblos Blancos with a church
- Alcalá del Valle, Sierra de Cádiz comarca; white village with megalithic standing stones nearby
- Algar, Sierra de Cádiz comarca; white village up a mountain road
- Espera, Sierra de Cádiz comarca; white village, panoramic views
- Vejer de la Frontera, La Janda comarca, province of Cádiz; white village.
- Frigiliana, Axarquía comarca, province of Málaga; white village, musk wine and olive oil
- Montefrío, Loja comarca, province of Granada; a top 10 National Geographic views in the world
- Zuheros, Subbética comarca, province of Córdoba; white village.
- Cabra, Subbética comarca; white village.
- Iznájar, Subbética comarca; white village.
- Priego de Córdoba, Subbética comarca; white village.
- Almedinilla, Subbética comarca; white village.
- Lucena, Subbética comarca; white village.

== Climate ==
The climate is mild and the surrounding countryside is green. Tourist activities available include hiking, rock-climbing, pot-holing, cycling, horseback riding, nature walks and the local food.
