= Battle of Majaceite =

Battle of the First Carlist War

- Part of First Carlist War
Date	23 November 1836
Location	Majaceite River, near Arcos de la Frontera, Andalusia, Spain
Result	Liberal victory

Belligerents
Carlists supporting Infante Carlos of Spain	Liberals (Isabelinos or Cristinos) supporting Isabella II of Spain and her regent mother Maria Christina

Commanders and leaders
Miguel Gómez Damas	Ramón María Narváez y Campos

Strength
6,000	25,000

Casualties and losses
High	Moderate

The Battle of Majaceite was fought in the First Carlist War. Ramón María Narváez y Campos was ordered to intercept the expedition of the Carlist general Miguel Gómez Damas. Narváez left Madrid in October 1836 with three divisions, while Gómez Damas left Ronda on 18 November 1836, entering Algeciras on 22 November.

On 23 November, when he departed Algeciras, Gómez Damas found himself surrounded at the citadel known as Alcalá de los Gazules. Gómez Damas attempted to reach Arcos de la Frontera, but met Narváez's army at the Majaceite River. The battle resulted with Gómez Damas’ withdrawal to Villamartín. An English commentator wrote that “it was at Majaciete that [Narváez] rescued Andalucía from the Carlist invasion by a brilliant coup de main, in a rapid but destruction action, which will not readily be effaced from the memory of the southern provinces.”
