= Benamahoma =

Town in Cádiz province, Spain

Coordinates: 36°46′N 5°28′W

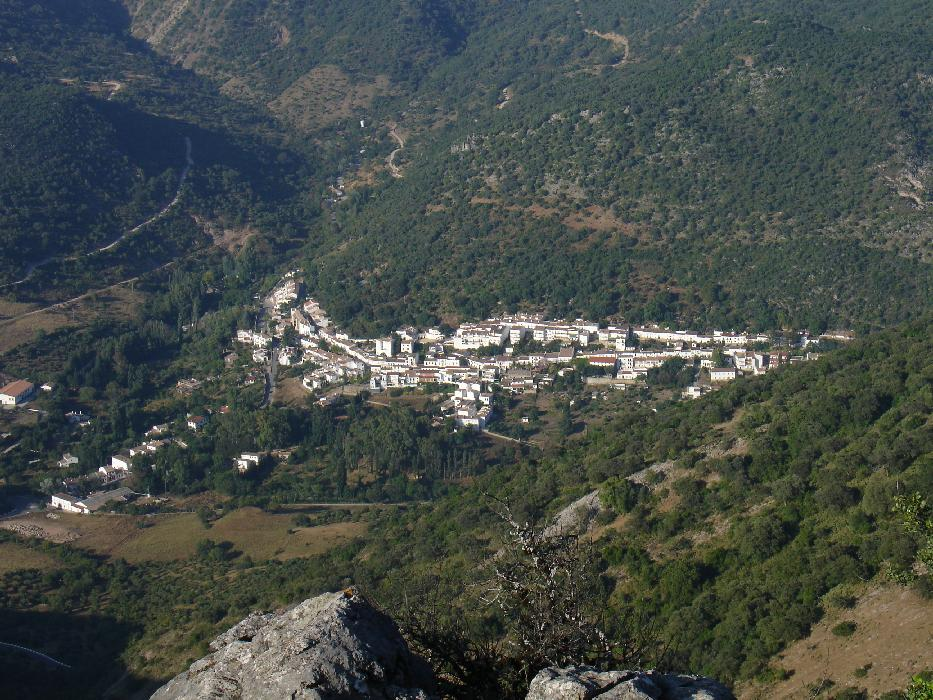
View of Benamahoma

Benamahoma (Arabic “Sons of Muhammad”), one of the White Towns of Andalusia, is a town of some 400 inhabitants in Cádiz province, Spain. It is located 5 km from El Bosque, Cádiz, and lies within the Sierra de Grazalema Natural Park.

== Culture ==
It is well known for its festival of Moros y Cristianos (Moors and Christians), which is celebrated in the first week of August in honor of Saint Anthony of Padua, patron saint of the town.

== Nature ==
It contains the Fuente de Nacimiento or Manantial de El Nacimiento, a natural spring that gives rise to the river Majaceite.

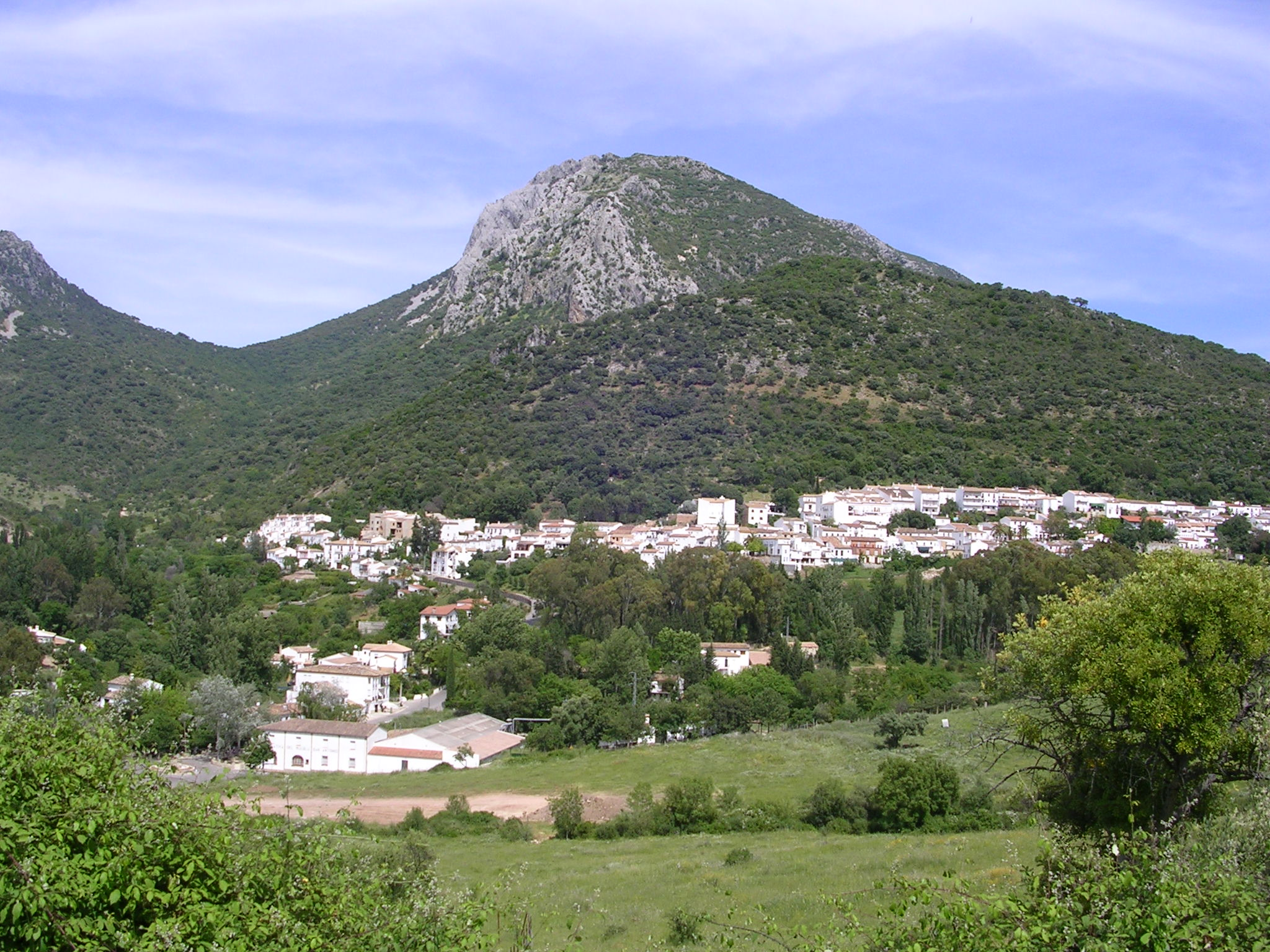
Benamahoma
