= Olvera =

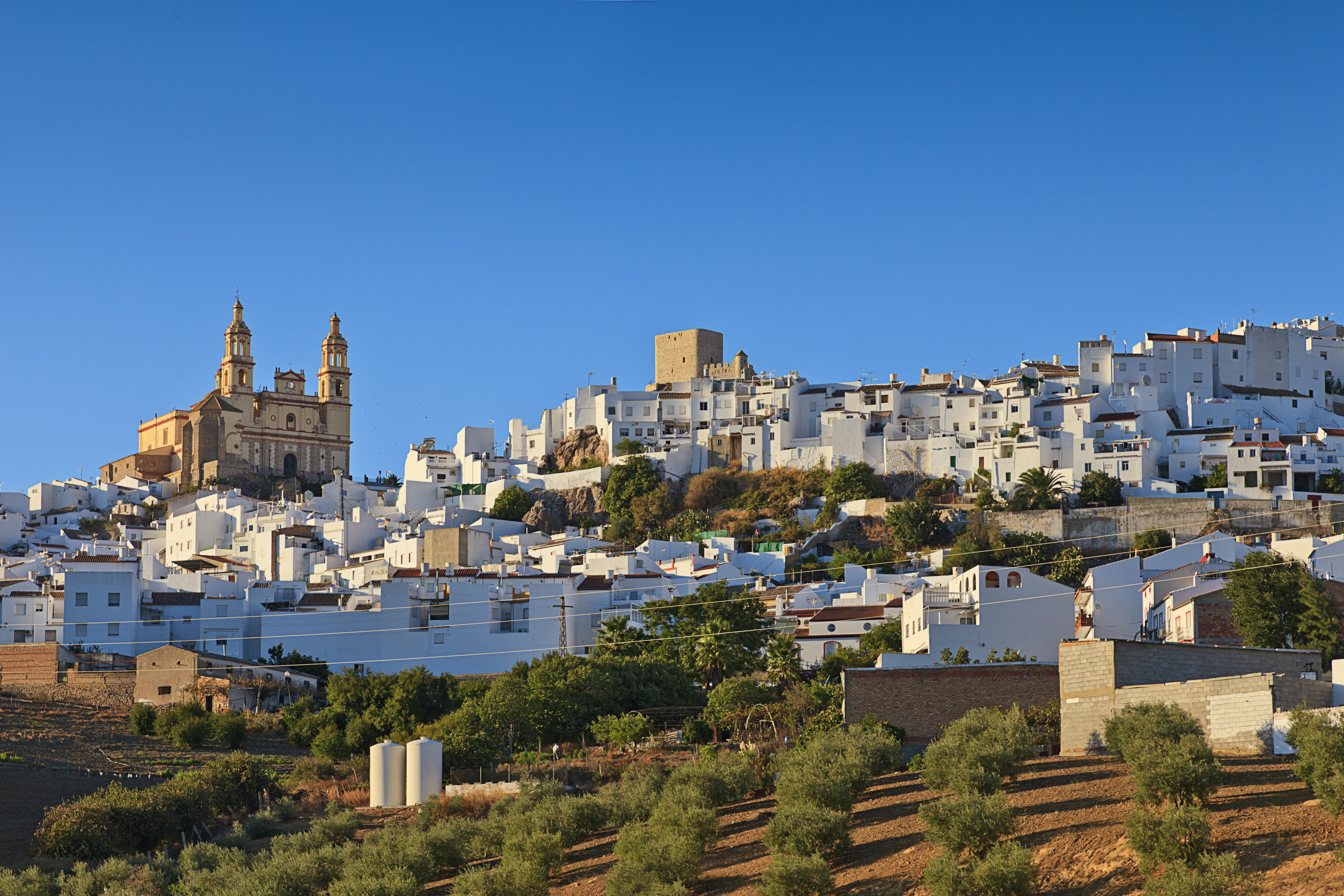
- Olvera at sunset

- Flag Coat of arms

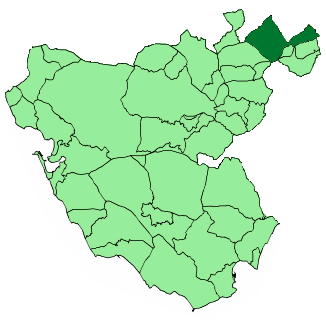
- Location of Olvera

- Location in the province of Cádiz Olvera (Andalusia) Olvera (Spain)
- Coordinates: 36°56′4″N 5°15′35″W
- Autonomous community: Andalusia
- Province: Cádiz
- Comarca: Sierra de Cádiz

Government
  - Mayor: Francisco Parraga Rodríguez (PSOE)

Area
  - Total: 194 km^{2} (75 sq mi)
  - Land: 194 km^{2} (75 sq mi)
  - Water: 0.00 km^{2} (0 sq mi)

Population (2025-01-01)
  - Total: 7,842
  - Density: 40.4/km^{2} (105/sq mi)
- Time zone: UTC+1 (CET)
  - Summer (DST): UTC+2 (CEST)
- Website: olvera.es

Olvera is a town in the province of Cádiz, Andalusia, Spain. According to the 2005 census, the city has a population of 8,585 inhabitants.

== Overview ==
At the tip of the "White towns route", the city of Olvera is in the province of Cadiz, in the northwest of the Serranía Gaditana area, near the borders of the provinces of Seville and Malaga, on 36º56' north and 5º16' west, at a height of 643 metres (2,110 ft) above sea level and has a land surface of 194 km^{2} (75 sq mi).

The distance between the capital and the Olvera is 139 km (86 mi). The number of inhabitants, according to the INE of 2021, is 8,016, although the number of "Olvereños" is possibly greater as migration to the coast (specifically to the Costa de la Luz) in search of employment where individuals decided to change their address to their place of work.

Two million olive trees are estimated to grow on the hills surrounding Olvera. In recent years it has received the award of the "Denominación de Origen de la Sierra de Cádiz", which is a standard that is recognised by participants including nearby towns of Setenil, Algodonales, Alcalá del Valle, Torre Alháquime etc. While olive groves are of great importance to the economy, the largest economic source of the town is the cooperative, and the prize "Arco Iris" of 1989 was won due to the town having the greatest number of cooperatives per inhabitant.

Of great interest within the municipality is a large colony of Andalusian griffon vultures (Gyps fulvus) to be found within the natural reserve of the "Peñon de Zaframagón", a huge rock outcrop that is located 14 km to the northwest of the town centre.

== History ==
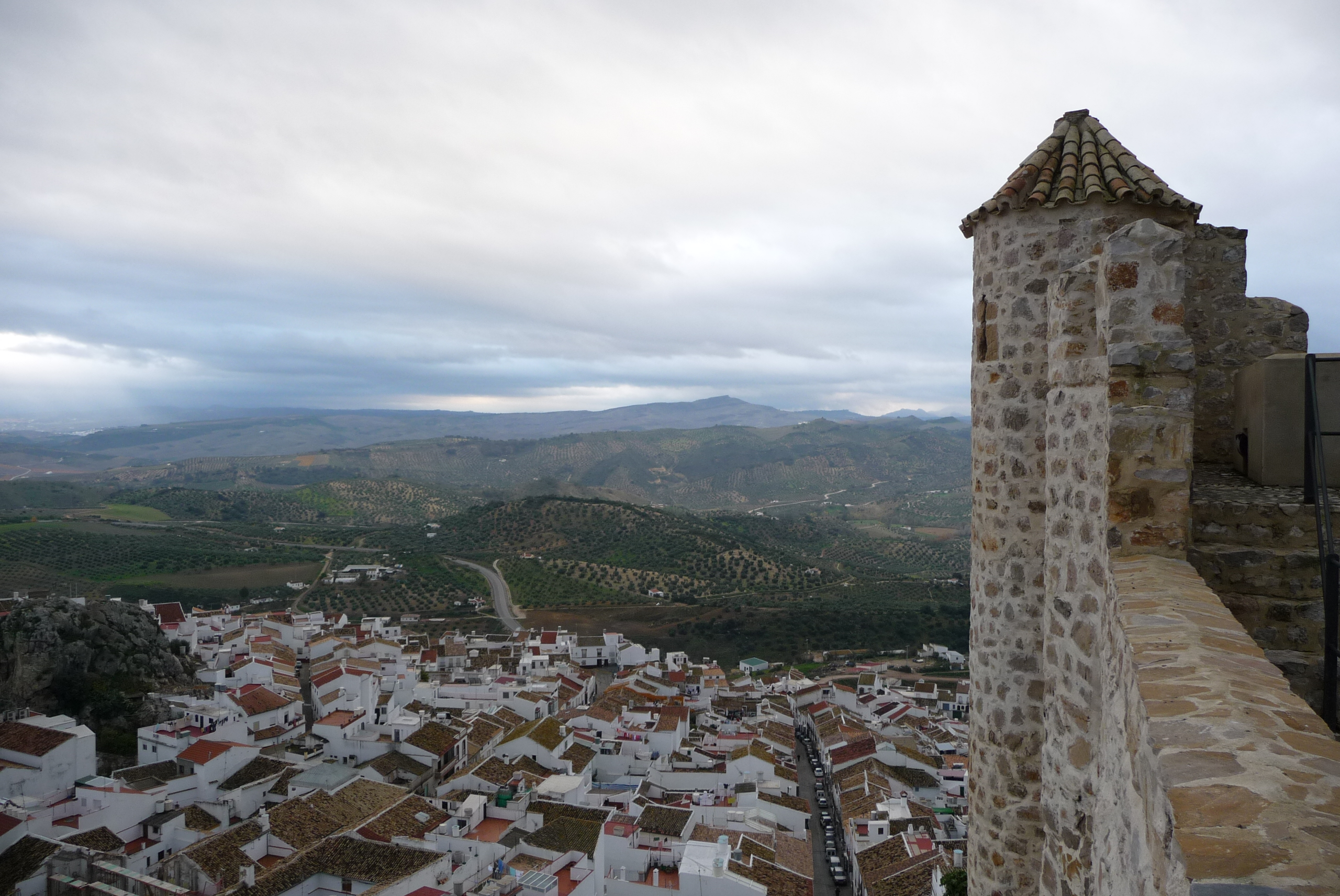
Olvera from its castle

Historical population
Year	Pop.	±%
1999	8,818	—
2000	8,685	−1.5%
2001	8,538	−1.7%
2002	8,614	+0.9%
2003	8,584	−0.3%
2004	8,549	−0.4%
2005	8,585	+0.4%
Source: INE (Spain)

There is a lack of specific data and studies into the true origin of the town. This means it is of conjecture to historians, some thinking that the present city was an establishment named Caricus, about the time of the Celts. Professor Ramos Santana posits that the legendary Cenosia, the original name of Olvera, located near the present city centre, was known as Vallehermoso (beautiful valley), existing at the time of the Visigoths.

In this area of the mountain range of Sierra de Lijar are numerous Roman camps and remains. The archaeologist Lorenzo Perdigones' report (1986) shows the existence of a Roman establishment in the area, dated the end of 3rd century B.C. Indeed, the foundations of the city castle were found to be Roman, during the removal of some of the rubble. The original name of Olvera could be "Ilipa", (established by geographically adjusting in a map of Roman Spain, published in 1879, between Morón and Ronda). Hippa and Hippo Nova are likely names of the original village.

But the first demonstrably reliable origin of Olvera is within Muslim documentation, in the mid 12th Century, when it is chronicled as an outpost in the mountains called "WUBIRA" or "URIWILA" (year 1327) when king Alfonso XI wrested it from the Arabs. As part of the Christian conquest plans emanating from Seville, Olvera formed part of the advance strategy towards the Straits of Gibraltar to prevent the reinsurgence of Muslims. In one first expedition the Christians lost the banner of Seville that flew in Olvera castle. After the negotiations that followed the surrender of the town, Ibrahim-ibn-Utmain secured concessions, in respect of the Moors of Olvera, that each one of the inhabitants could keep their houses and goods.

The village was repopulated through a decree, a 'Letter of Population', issued on the 1 of August 1327, in which all criminals and debtors could, and had to, remain a year within the borders of Nazarí (Granada province?) in order that their debt to society be removed. This new acquisition for the King of Castilla was named Olivera to commemorate the sea of olive trees that surround it. With time, the "i" was phonetically lost giving rise to the present name.

In the middle of the 14th century the town passed to Don Alfonso Perez de Guzman. It is known that in 1395 Perez de Guzman arranged the marriage of his daughter with the son of the Muslim, Zunigaga.

Olvera was host to a detachment of Napoleonic troops, who were constantly harassed by the activities of guerrillas from the town until the French retreated in 1812.

Subsequently, two stately houses had the dominion over Olvera, the last of which was Tellez Giron and the Dukes of Osuna. The later was the feudal lord until 1843, when the family went bankrupt.

Some of the advances and episodes of great importance in Spanish history during the 19th century were echoed in Olvera, for instance the revolution of September 1868, (known as 'The Glorious One'), when (after a brief period as a Republic) the Monarchy granted Olvera, by Royal Decree on 8 May 1877, the title of "City" by Alfonso XII, in gratitude for certain horses that sped him from the town of Olvera to one of the Carlist wars.

The years of the dictatorship of Franco provided opportunities for the Olvereños, who benefited from the building of the Jerez-Almargen railroad which terminated within the municipality. The project was never finished. This is now a well known "Via Verde" - a nature walk of some 40 km.

In 1983 Olvera was declared “A Protected Area of Artistic and Historical Importance”.

At the present time, Olvera is dedicated to agriculture, forestry and animal husbandry, activities that are complemented by the tourist activities and the cooperatives.starting in Olvera and reaching Puerto Serrano.

Nicholas de Ribera, El Viejo, 'the old one', was born in Olvera in 1487 and took part in the conquest of Peru. In 1535 he was named the first mayor of Lima.

== Economy ==
Nowadays Olvera largely survives through family cooperatives, based on agriculture, tourism and the construction industry at the coast.

== Monuments of interest ==
The main monument of this city is itself. A phrase that exemplifies this reality is "OLVERA is a street, a church and a castle, BUT what a street, what a church and what a castle!", for that reason Olvera was declared “A Protected Area of Artistic and Historical Importance” in 1983.

=== Nuestra Señora de la Encarnación church ===
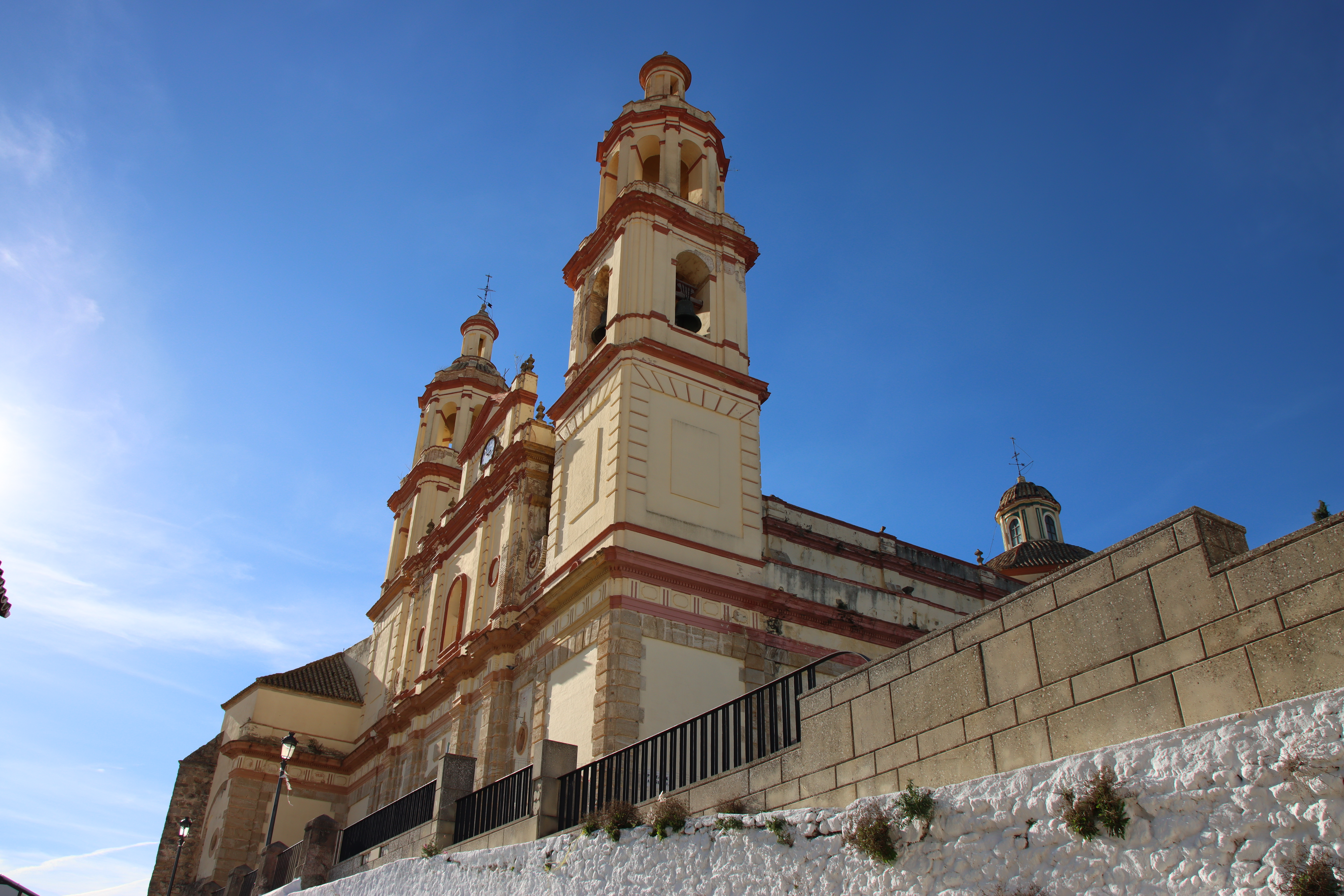
Parish of Our Lady of the Incarnation, Olvera

Dominating the area, like the top of a pyramid, is Parroquia de Nuestra Señora de la Encarnación (the Parish of Our Lady of the Incarnation) next to the Arabic Castle: it is the vertex of a white expanse of houses amongst olive groves. This church, in neoclassic style, was built by the orders of the Duke of Osuña in 1822 (which created a debt with the Olvera township by not investing the taxes in the improvement of the town) on the foundations of a small gothic- mudéjar (Andalucian Moorish) style church (conserving and incorporating a small baptismal room), which in turn was built on the foundations of an Arabic mosque. The work was finished in 1843, culminating in one of the greatest churches of the province, with dimensions worthy of cathedral. In 1936 republican revolutionaries burnt some of the icons and images along with the interior during the Spanish Civil War. In the interior are several frescos, stained glass windows of great value and images of the different phases of the death of Christ can be found, among them a Crucified Christ from the 16th century, discovered 15 years ago in the cellars of the building. The last restoration started in 1994 being closed to the congregation until the conclusion of works at the end of the 1999. At present the greater church of Olvera is again closed, due to a fire lasting 15 hours of an image/statue in September 2004, leaving the sacred place in lamentable condition. It is hoped that the necessary money will soon be obtained to reopen the church.

=== The Arab castle ===
As it stands, the castle was constructed at the end of the 12th century, mostly in the 13th, on a strategic rock, giving the ability to communicate with other nearby castles through signals (e.g. reflecting light with mirrors). Its structure was created deliberately to disadvantage enemy to the maximum.

=== The Moorish Wall ===
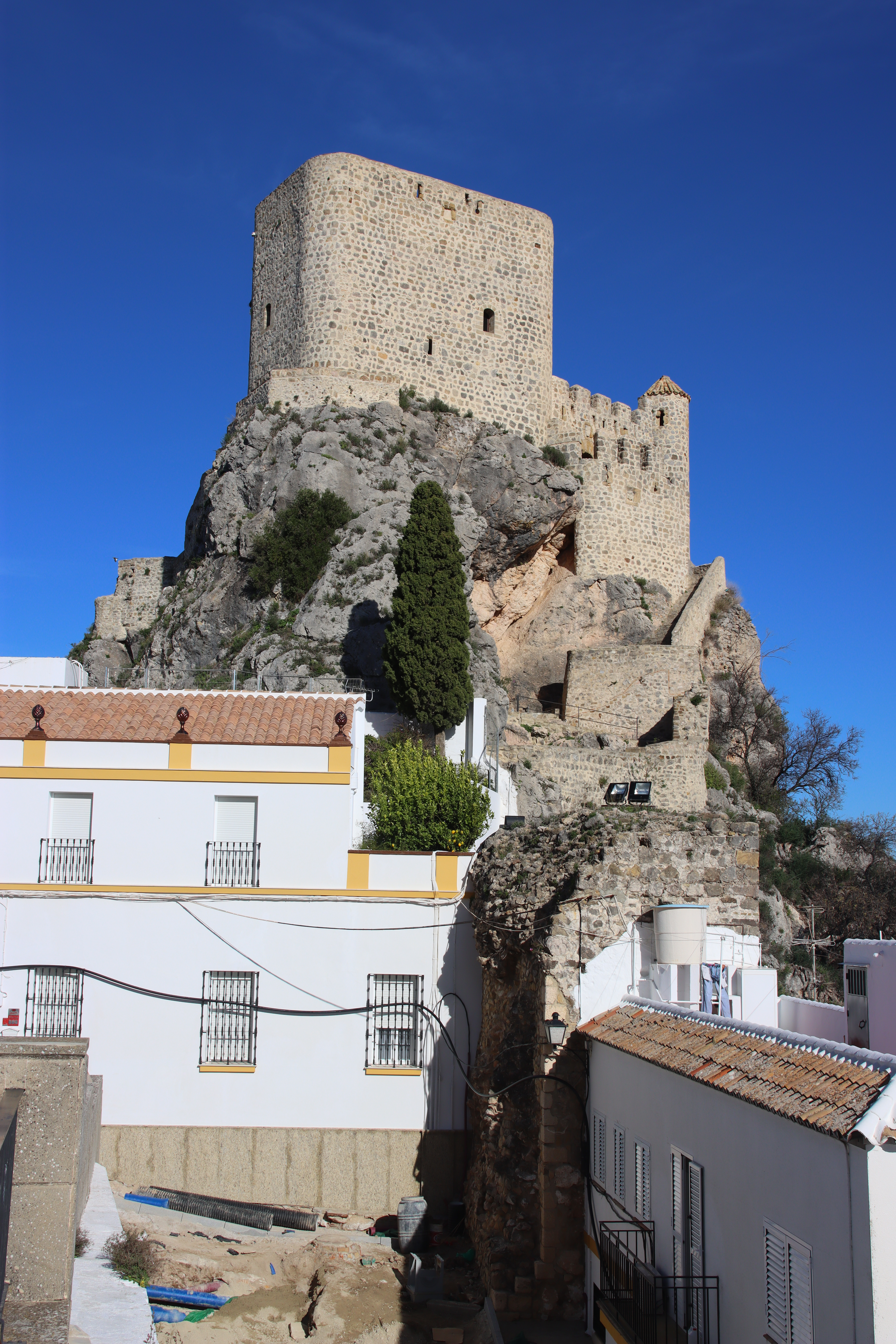
Castle of Olvera

There exists seven buttresses that support the wall, demolition of some of the wall has emphasized the "Cilla", which served as a jail and a ducal barn, amongst other uses. Today it is a tourist office and a municipal museum, comprising four display rooms and a patio with a majestic view. In one of its rooms there is a permanent exhibition on "the Castles and Strengths of the Nazarí Kingdoms".

=== La Villa District ===
Near these other buildings, in the “Casco Antigüo” (the ancient town center) within the old town walls is la villa (the village). To walk its streets is to travel 700 years back, to when an older Olvera existed. This was where the Visigoth town called Wubira existed. The towns origins are evident here, (narrow streets, strategic corners, old cottages, etc.), exposing the visitor to the old architecture of the Muslim town entwined with the modern.

=== La plaza de Andalusia ===
The plaza, also called "La Alameda" (tree lined area), has a majestic stone fountain/waterfall constructed in 2004. Above this is el Peñón del Sagrado Corazón de Jesús (the Rock of the Sacred Heart of Jesus), a great rock garden full of ivy, flowers, birds and animals. The reason for its name is the Christ statue, with arms raised, on the highest part of the rock carved by Jose Even Navas, in 1929.

=== El Santuario de Nuestra Señora de Los Remedios ===
The Sanctuary of Our Lady of the Remedies is 2 km from the town centre. It was constructed in the 18th century, in Andalucian style on the foundations of a small hermitage. It venerates the patron of the locality, Nuestra Señora de Los Remedios, who is loved by the town of Olvera and many towns around, known collectively as “las cientos sierras” (the 100 mountain ranges). Unknown persons created an original statue to her during the 16th century, which was restored 10 years ago. The head of the statue is in poor condition as the galleries became infested with termites for more than a century, however, the best possible restoration has been applied to it. The Archbishop of Seville, Don Good Jose Maria Monreal, was crowned here in 1966.

=== El Monasterio de Caño Santos ===
Located 7 km from Olvera, it was constructed in 1542. For many years it was the seat of the old patrona of the city, the Holy virgin of Caño, an image kept by the local Franciscan friars who inhabited the interior. In 1835 they were expelled and the monastery confiscated and abandoned. After many years, when the building was all but lost, the council of Andalusia decided to restore it. Although the monument is within the municipality of Olvera, this monastery is property of the city council of Alcala del Valle.

== See also ==
- List of municipalities in Cádiz
