= Castle of Matrera =

Castle in Spain

- Castillo de Matrera (Spanish)
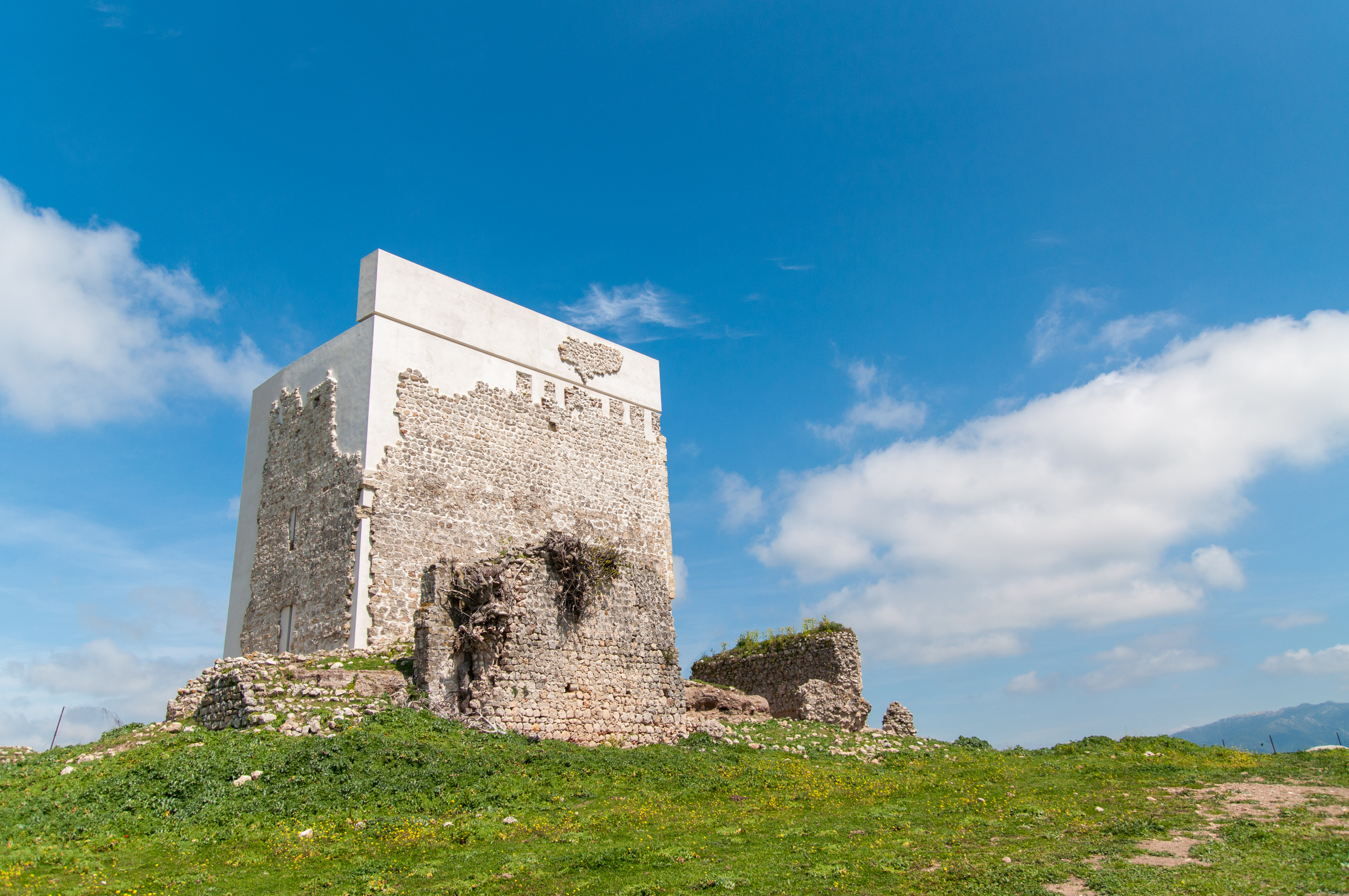
- The renovated Castle of Matrera

- Location within Spain
- 36.807256°N 5.565622°W
- Location: Villamartín, Spain

History
- Built: 9th century

Spanish Cultural Heritage
- Official name: Castillo de Matrera
- Type: Non-movable
- Criteria: Monument
- Designated: 1985
- Reference no.: (R.I.) – 51 – 0008200 – 00000

Castle of Matrera (Spanish: Castillo de Matrera or Torre Matrera) is a medieval castle at Villamartín near Prado del Rey in Spain dating back to the 9th century. It was declared a national monument in 1949 and an example of Bien de Interés Cultural ("Heritage of Cultural Interest") in 1985. The structure underwent a controversial restoration in 2015.

== History ==
It was built in the ninth century by Umar ibn Hafsun to defend Iptuci, the most advanced city of the Cora de Ronda. However, Mount Pajarete was a place of human settlement since Antiquity.

In the 13th century, it was conquered by Ferdinand III, who rebuilt it. Nevertheless, at the beginning of the XIV century, it returned to Muslim hands before being definitively reconquered by Alfonso XI in 1341. However, being located in the middle of the Moorish Border, it was besieged by the Muslims of Granada in 1408 and in 1445.

== Renovation ==
By 2010, only a few walls of the castle remained standing, and the ruins were further damaged by rain in 2013. A restoration project was launched in 2010, led by the architect Carlos Quevado, and completed in 2015. Parts of the tower were rebuilt with lime plaster similar to samples found on the site, with large, plain blocks defining the original shape of the castle. Quevado described his aim as being not only to protect the ruin, but to "recover the volume, texture, and tonality that the tower would originally have had", and to differentiate new additions from the original structure.

The renovation received negative reactions from some locals, with Spain's cultural heritage organization Hispania Nostra calling the project "absolutely terrible". It was praised by the architectural community, and was nominated for the 2016 Architizer A+ Award, in the Architecture Preservation category, winning the public choice vote. The Guardian described the design as neo-brutalist, and praised it for restoring "the clout its Moorish creators originally intended".

== Conservation ==
In 2013, a large part of the tower collapsed due to the scarce work of repairing the structural problems detected decades ago.

The subsequent work of preservation in 2016 with the authorization of the Junta de Andalucía was very controversial, receiving both criticism and a nomination to the New York A + Architizer awards, which ultimately ended up winning in the "Preservation" category.

== See also ==
- List of castles in Spain
