= Gaucín =

- Municipality
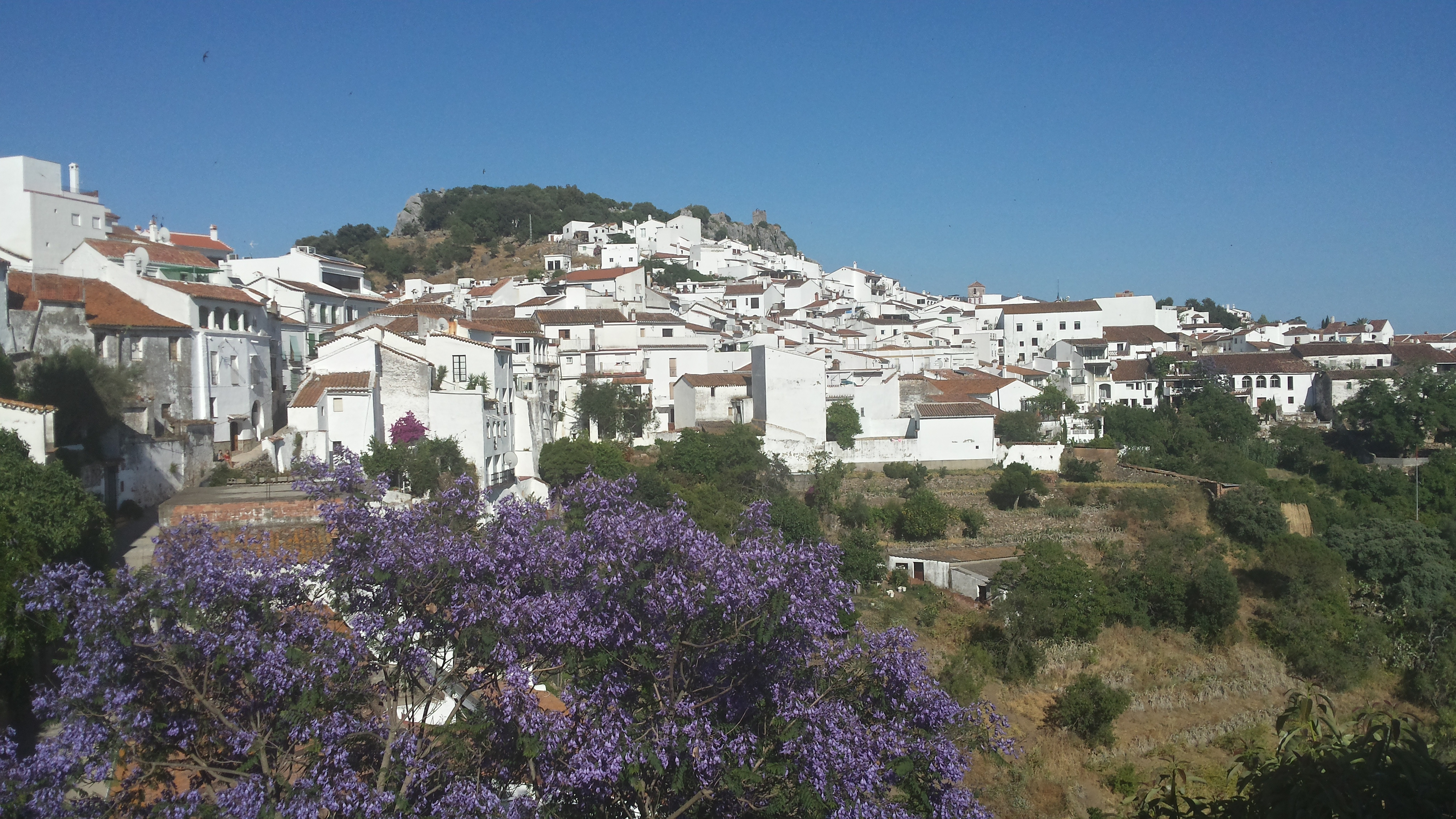

- Flag Coat of arms

- Location in Andalusia
- Coordinates: 36°31′N 5°19′W
- Sovereign state: Spain
- Autonomous community: Andalusia
- Province: Málaga

Area
  - Total: 98 km^{2} (38 sq mi)

Population (2025-01-01)
  - Total: 1,620
  - Density: 17/km^{2} (43/sq mi)
- Time zone: UTC+1 (CET)
  - Summer (DST): UTC+2 (CEST)

Gaucín (Spanish pronunciation: [ɡawˈθin]) is a town and municipality located in the mountains of Andalusia in the province of Málaga in southern Spain. It is inland from Marbella, Puerto Banús and Estepona and not far from Ronda.

The village has a population of approximately 2,000. It lies about 600 metres above sea level in the Sierra del Hacho, dominated by the Castillo del Aguila (Eagle's Castle), originally a Roman stronghold, expanded by the Arabs.

== Tourist appeal ==
Gaucín is known for its views of Gibraltar, the Strait of Gibraltar and Morocco, as well the surrounding mountain scenery. It can be used as a base for visits to the so-called pueblos blancos of Andalusia. The village is reached by a 24 km climb up a mountain road and presided over by a medieval castle. The population is augmented by a growing international community.

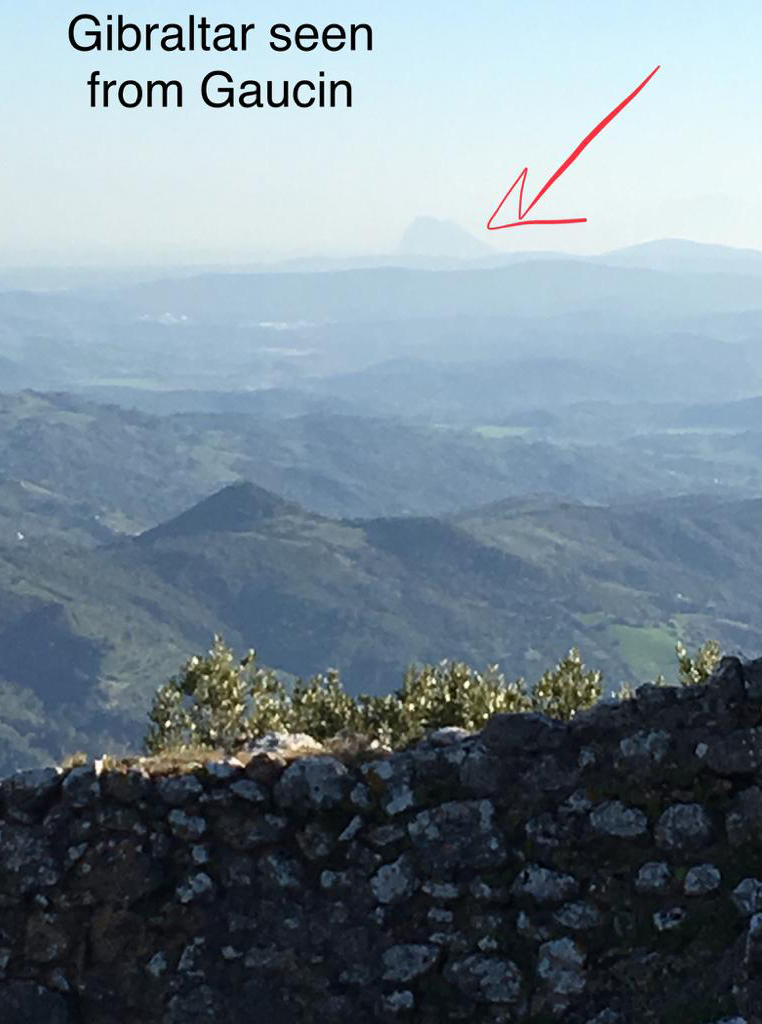
Gaucín offers visitors a window facing the Mediterranean sea

Gaucín has been the inspiration of a number of artists and writers, and has been referred to as the "balcony of the Ronda Mountains, where the Holy Child appeared to St. John of God: the illustrious, always noble, very hospitable village of Gaucín." Gaucín offers visitors to the region a panoramic view to the Mediterranean including the rock of Gibraltar.

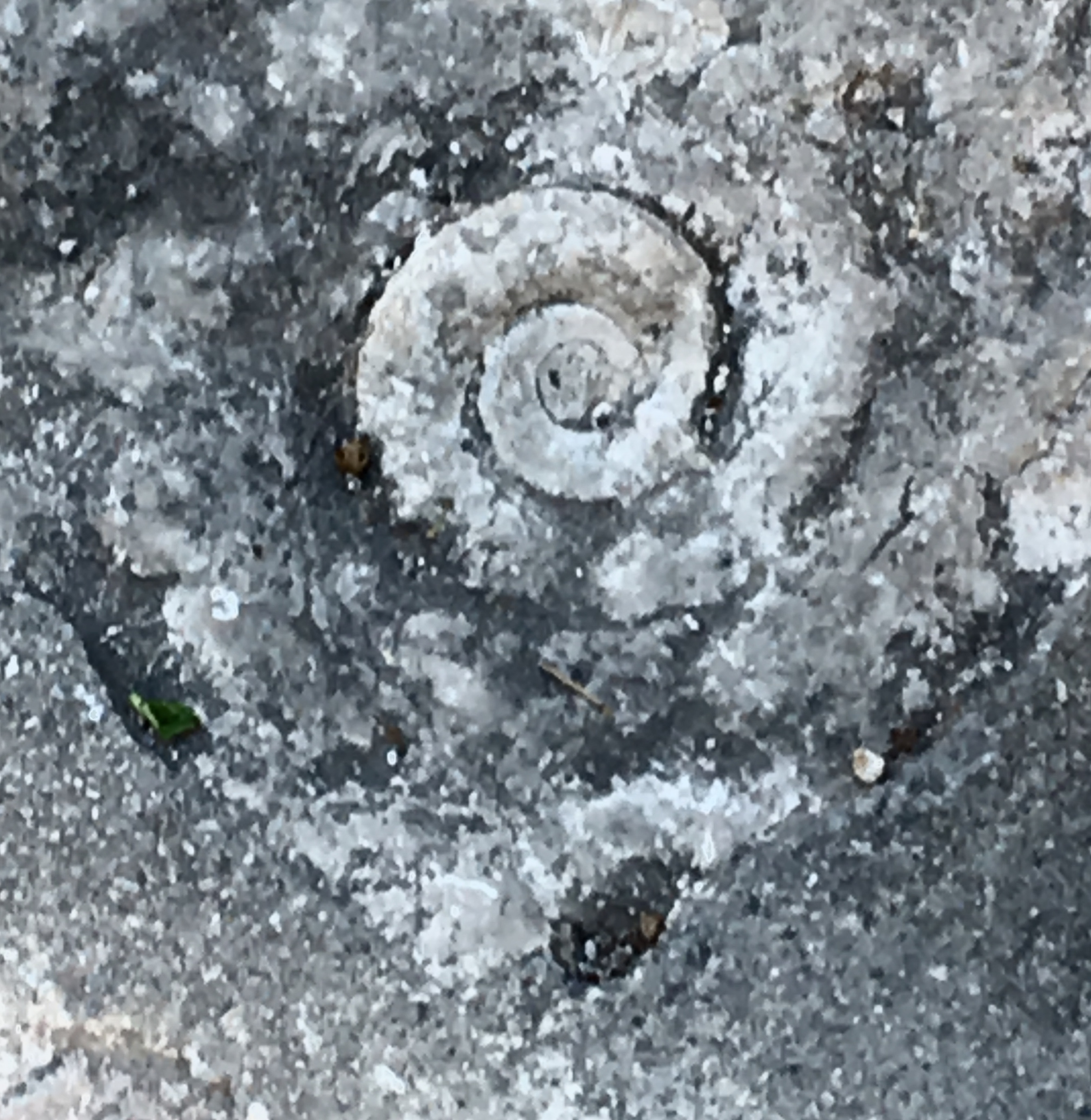
An example fossil that can be found in Gaucín

In Gaucín fossils can be found in the stoneworks of city building and street constructions.

== Cultural life ==
Palm Sunday includes a procession to the church. A widely attended Easter vigil takes place the night before. Easter Sunday celebrations include the traditional 'toro de cuerda', where a bull is released on a cord in the morning and sold in the afternoon.

A large carnival features chirigotas, costumed groups that sing of current events in a humorous way. A party held on the main square with an orchestra goes on until dawn.

The village holds a 'cultural week' in late July, with wine and meat tasting, as well as live musical performances in the main square.

The feria, which lasts three days, is a celebration of the town itself and is held annually in early August. It is complete with a variety of carnival rides and games booths. The festivities also include a large pavilion where visitors can eat, drink, and watch musicians perform and a procession of horse riders competing for an award for the best presented.

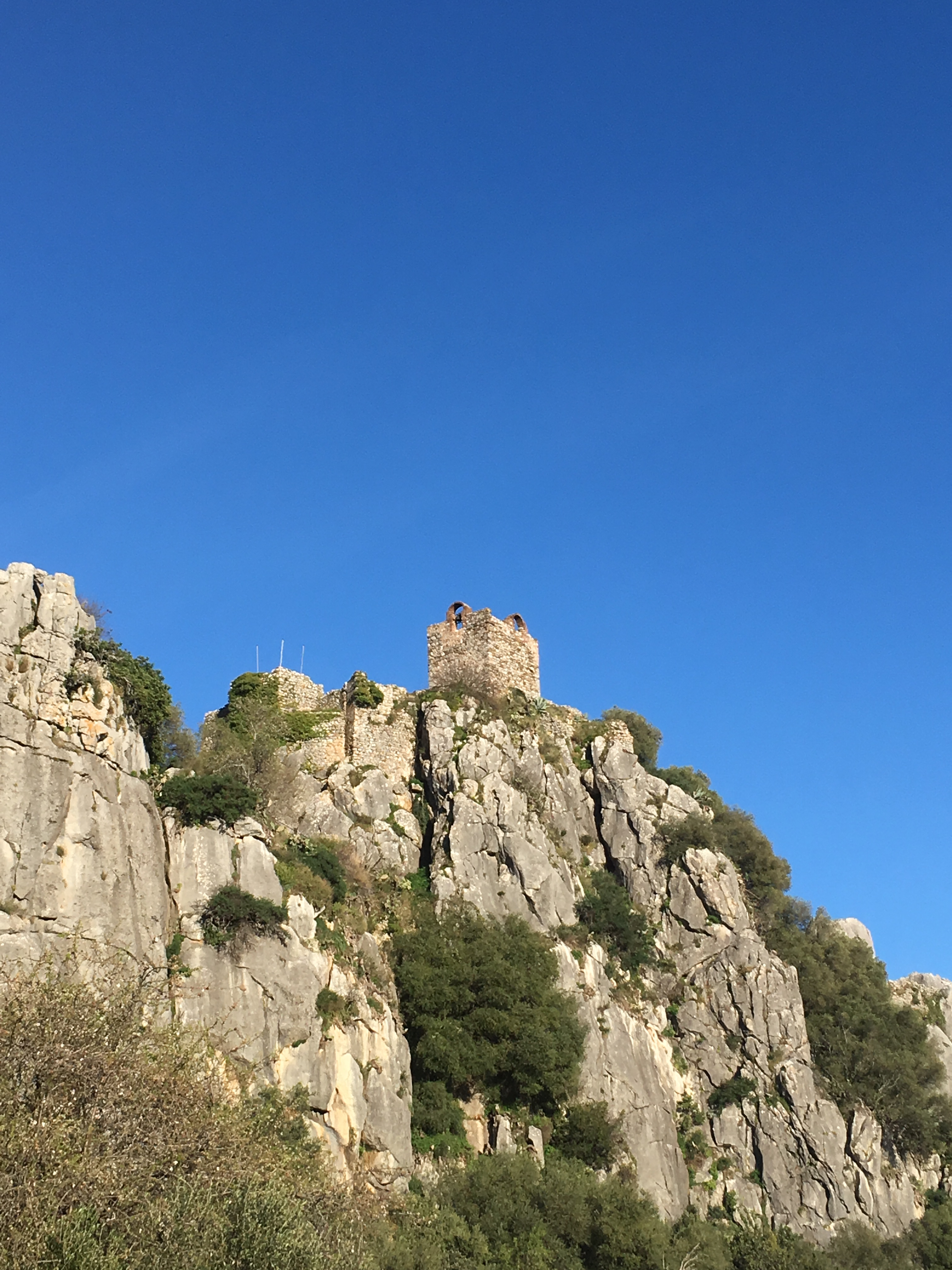
Castillo in Gaucín

The pilgrimage of the Holy Child is a romeria on the last Sunday of August. The image of the Holy Child is taken in procession from the castle to the site of his supposed apparition, now a hermitage, for a rociera (flamenco) mass followed by dancing, singing, eating and drinking until dawn.

A feast in honour of the Holy Child takes place on 7 and 8 September. Over nine days townsfolk climb to the castle for a novena, held in the Chapel of the Holy Child. Mass is celebrated and guest preachers preach. A party is given in the main square with processions, food, drink, music, and dancing.

== See also ==
- List of municipalities in Málaga
