= Majaceite =

River in Andalusia, Spain

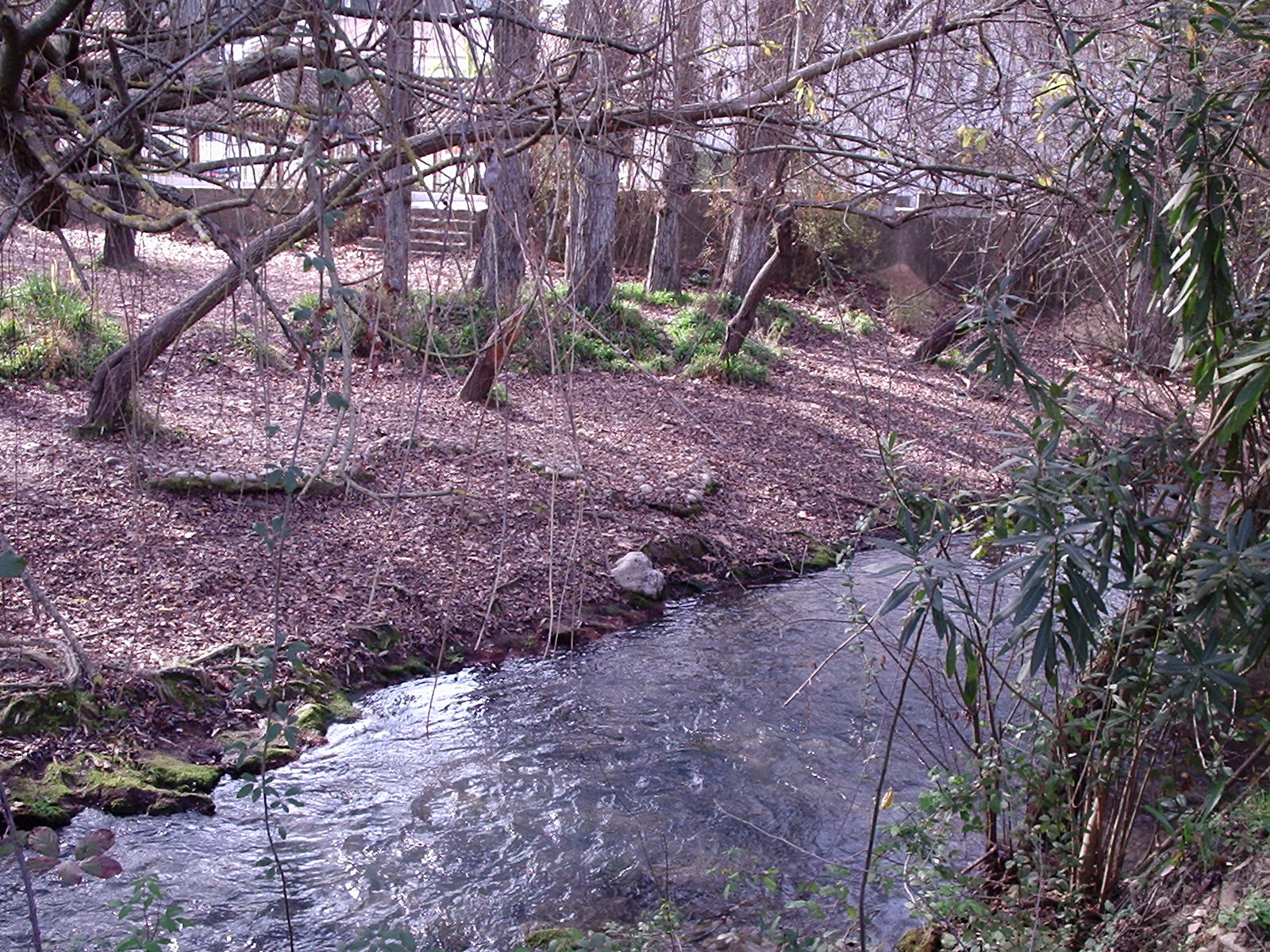
- The Majaceite as it passes through El Bosque, Cádiz

Location
- Country: Spain
- Region: Andalusia

Physical characteristics
- Source: Benamahoma
  - location: Cádiz (province), Spain
- Mouth
  - location: Junta de los Rios, Cadiz Province, Spain
- Length: 49 km (30 mi)

The Majaceite, also known as the Guadalcacín, is the main tributary of the river Guadalete in Andalusia, Spain. Most of its course runs through the national park of the Sierra de Grazalema. The Battle of Majaceite took place on its banks in 1836.

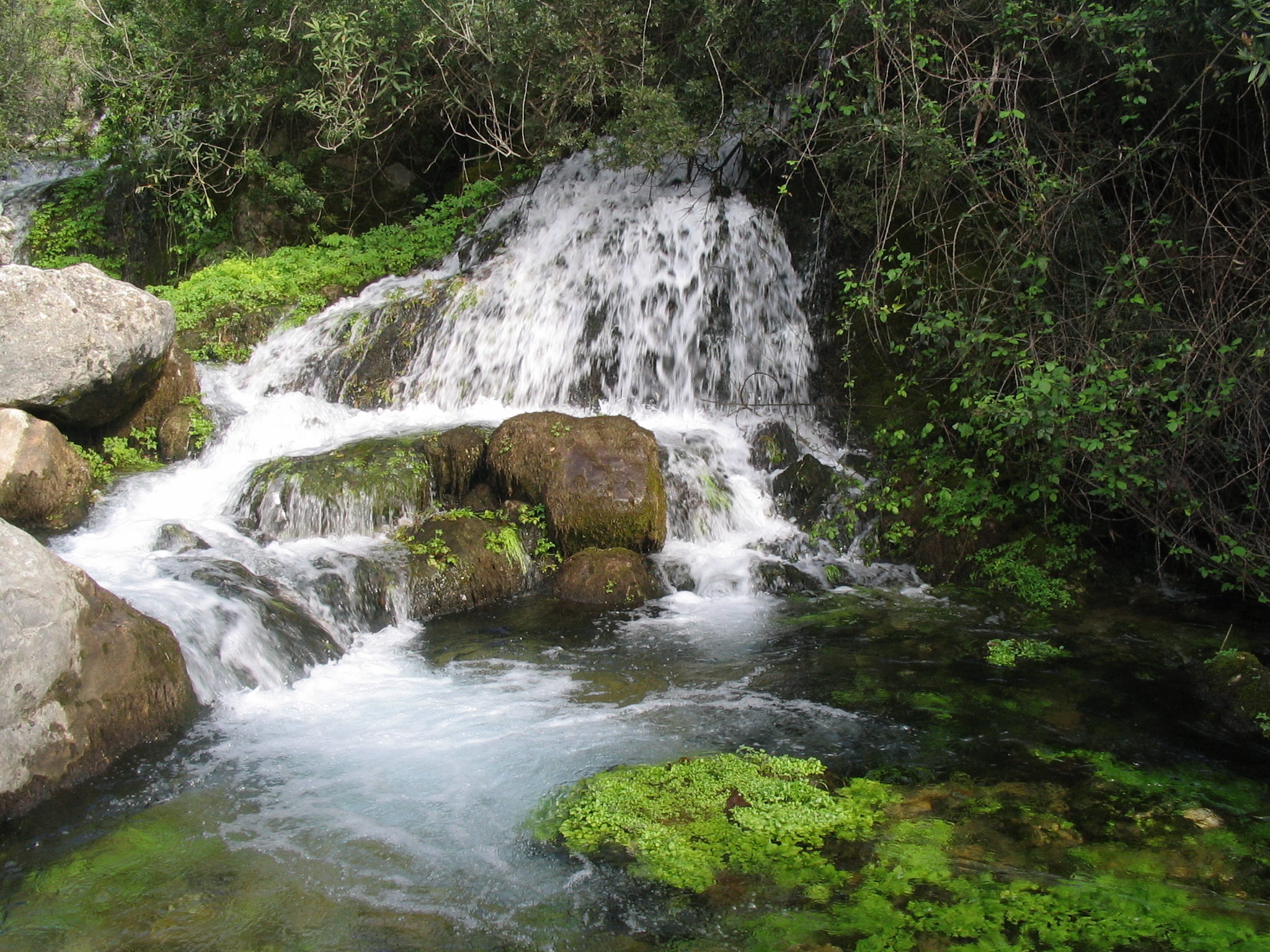
Source of the Majaceite, at Benamahoma

== See also ==
- List of rivers of Spain
