= El Bosque, Spain =

El Bosque
- Municipality
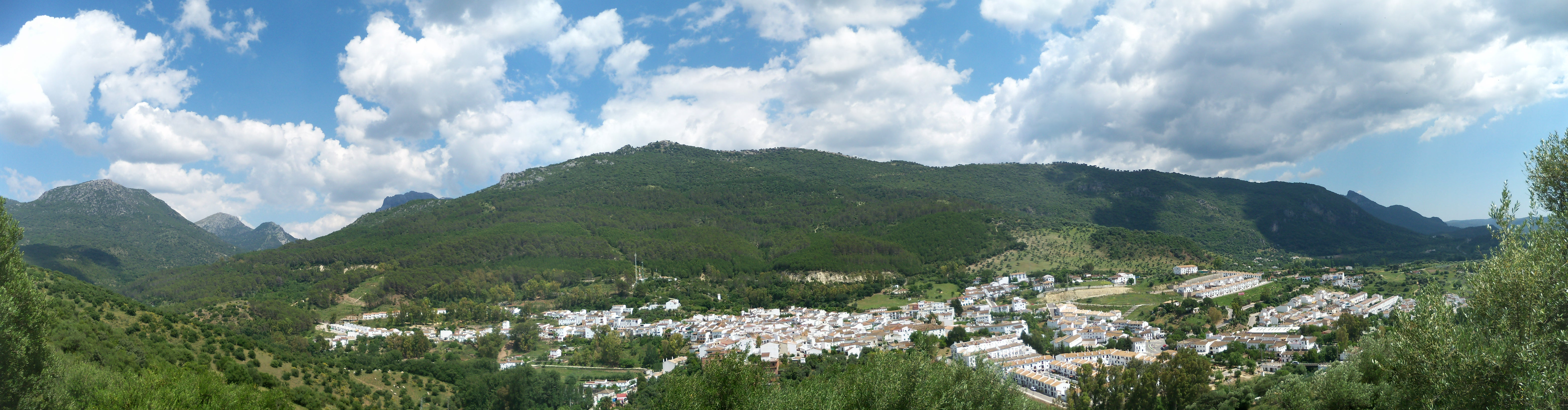

- Coat of arms

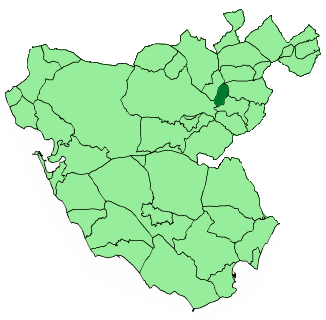
- Location of El Bosque

- Location in Spain
- Coordinates: 36°45′N 5°30′W
- Country: Spain
- Autonomous community: Andalusia
- Province: Cádiz
- Comarca: Sierra de Cádiz

Government
  - Alcaldesa: Inmaculada Gil López (2011) (PP)

Area
  - Total: 30.75 km^{2} (11.87 sq mi)
- Elevation: 298 m (978 ft)

Population (2025-01-01)
  - Total: 2,242
  - Density: 72.91/km^{2} (188.8/sq mi)
- Demonym: Bosqueño/a
- Time zone: UTC+1 (CET)
  - Summer (DST): UTC+2 (CEST)
- Postal code: 11670
- Website: www.ayto-elbosque.es

El Bosque is a town and municipality located in the province of Cádiz, Spain. According to the 2005 census, the city has a population of 2,004 inhabitants.

== Demographics ==
Historical population
Year	Pop.	±%
1999	1,847	—
2000	1,875	+1.5%
2001	1,868	−0.4%
2002	1,911	+2.3%
2003	1,977	+3.5%
2004	1,978	+0.1%
2005	2,004	+1.3%
Source: INE (Spain)

== Gallery ==
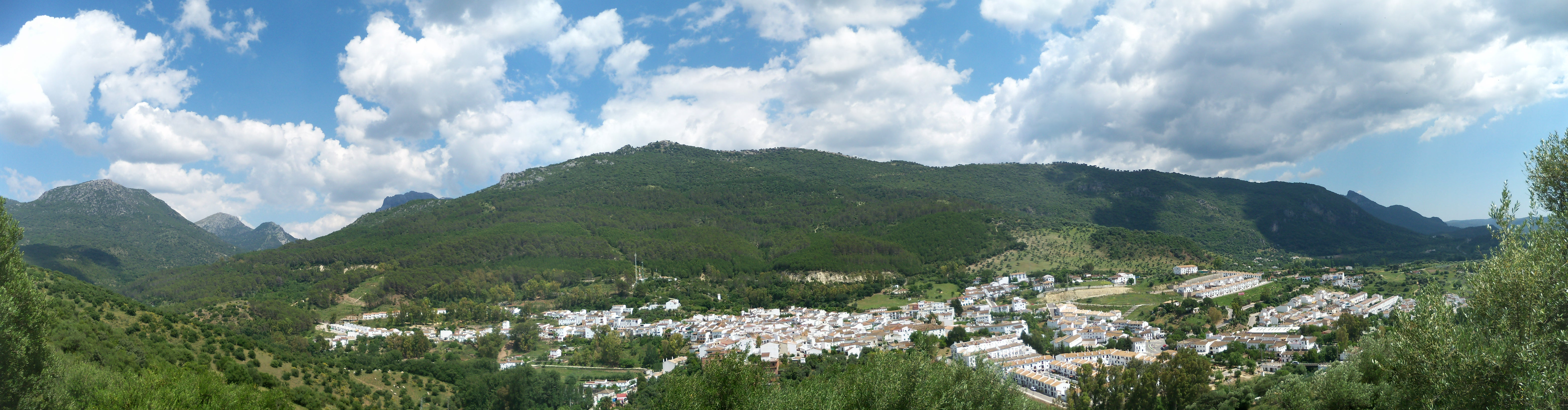
El Bosque from "Lomo de Enmedio"

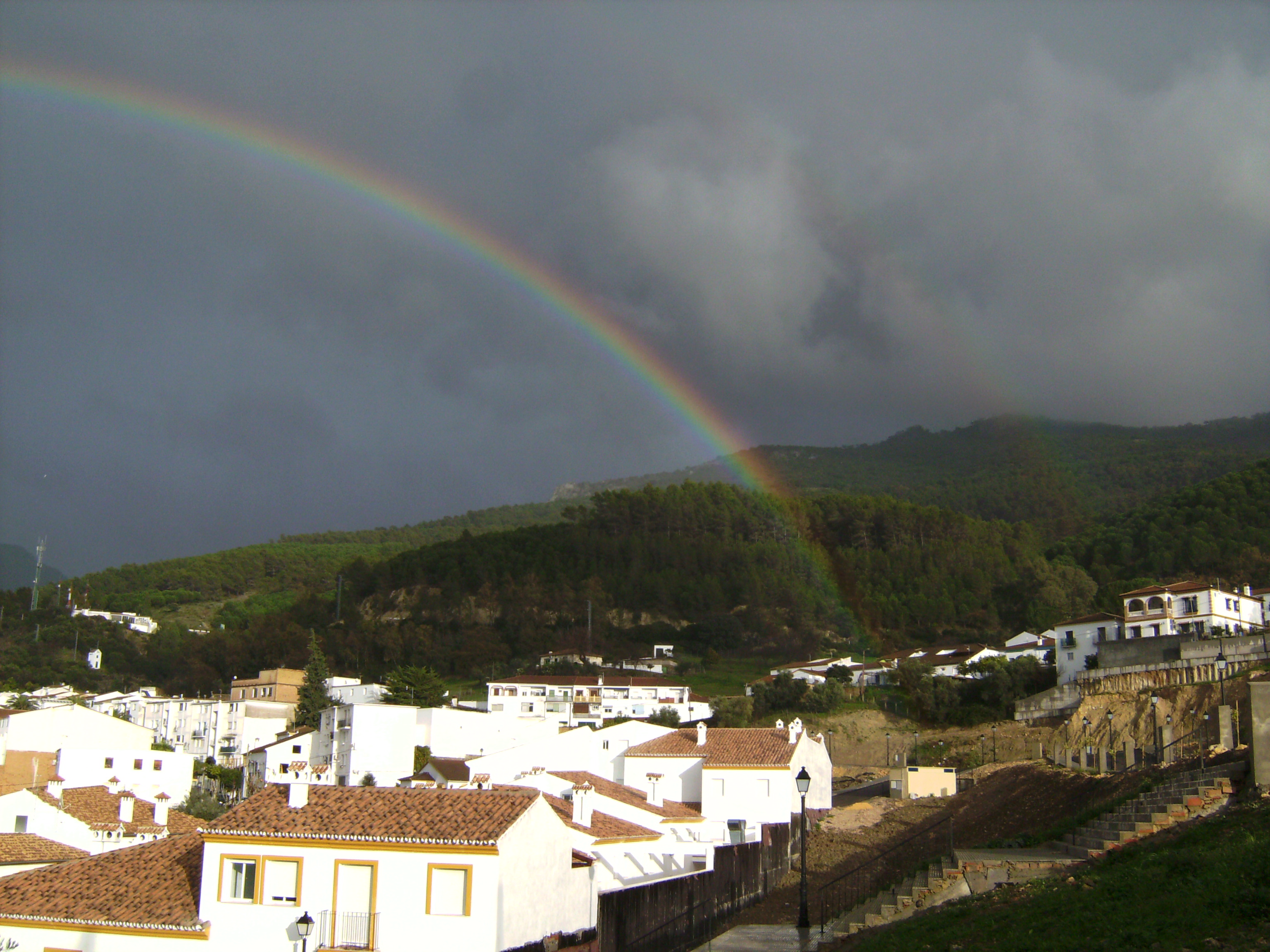
Double rainbow in El Bosque

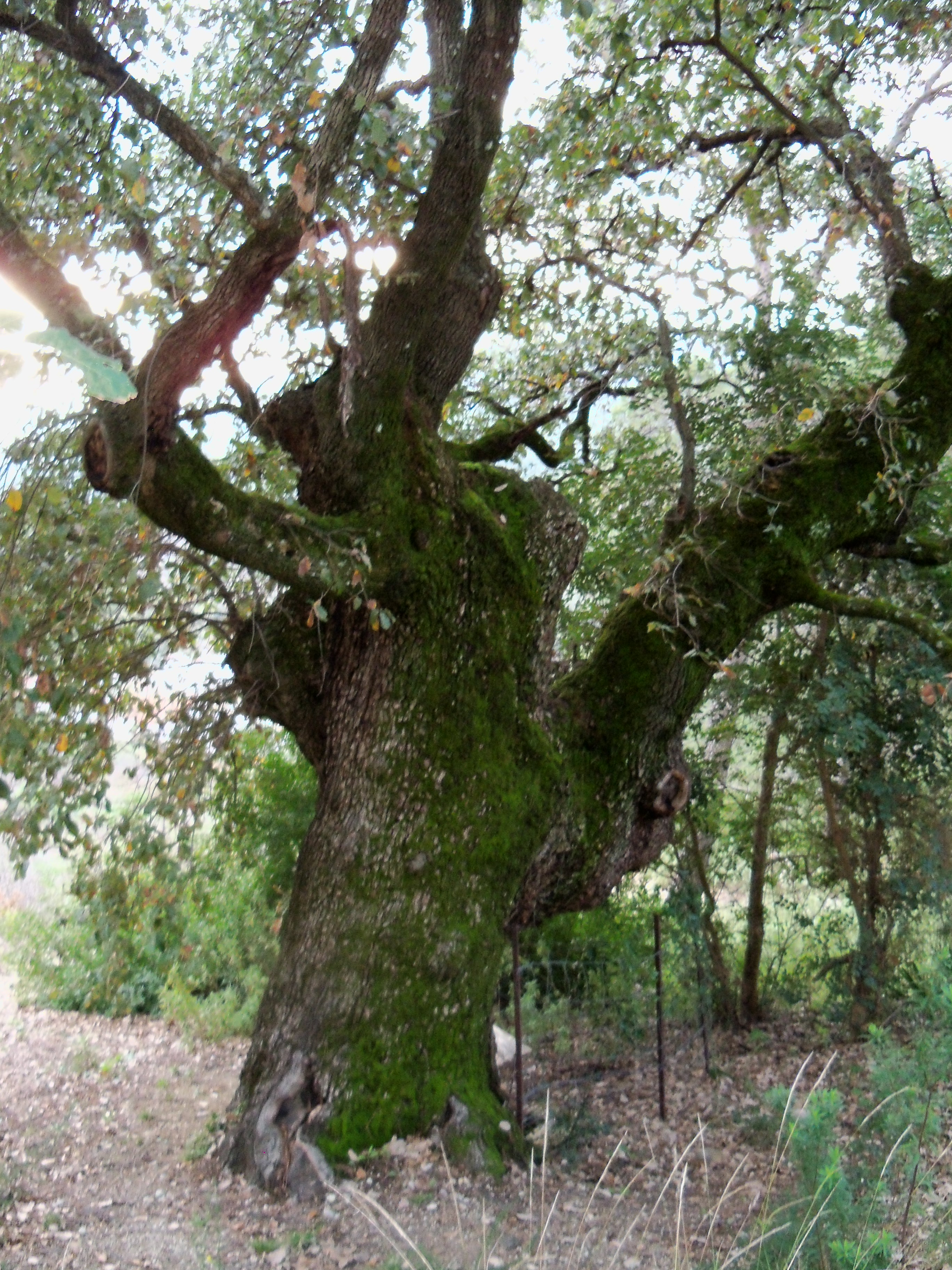
Quejigo (Quercus faginea) in El Bosque

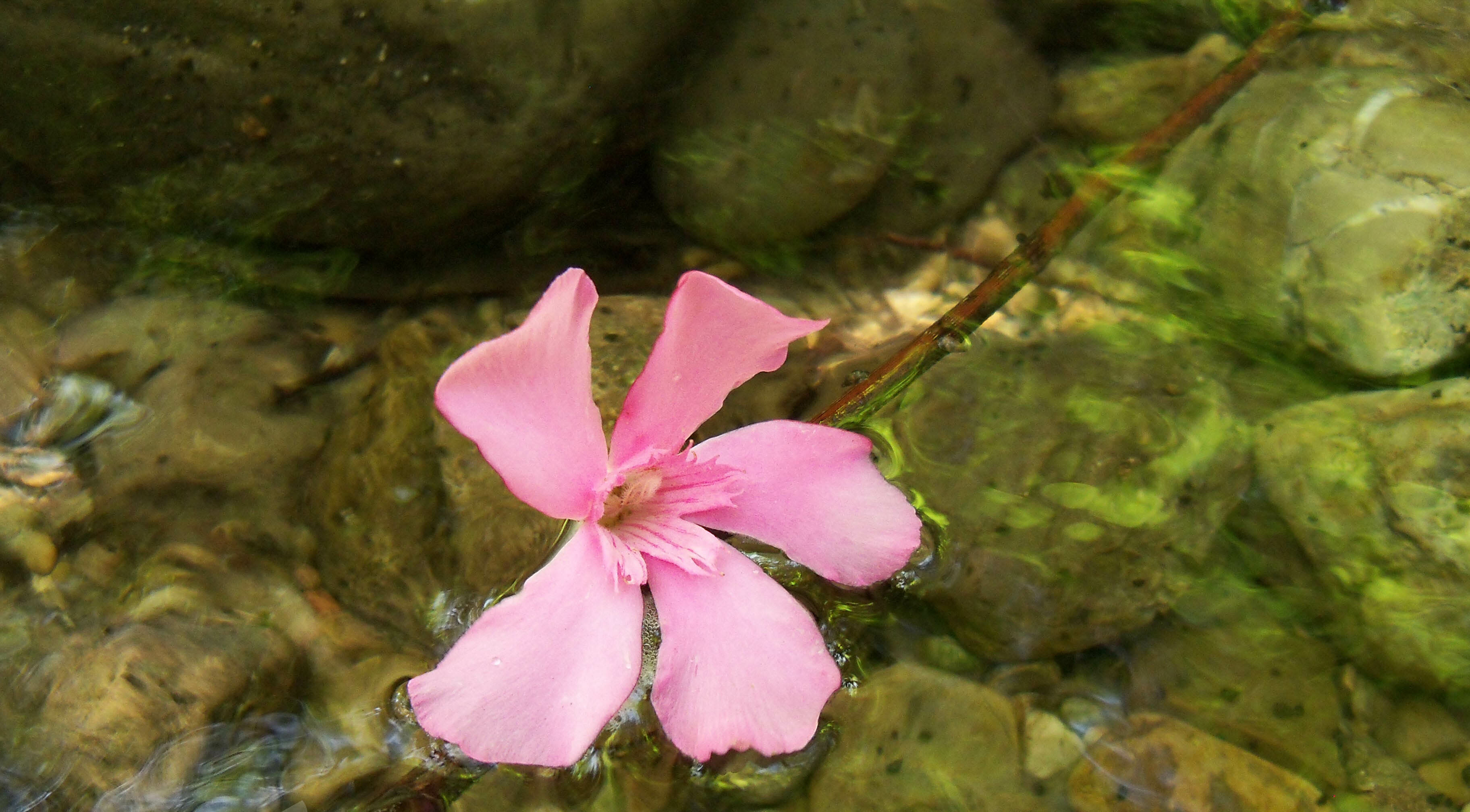
Flower on the river

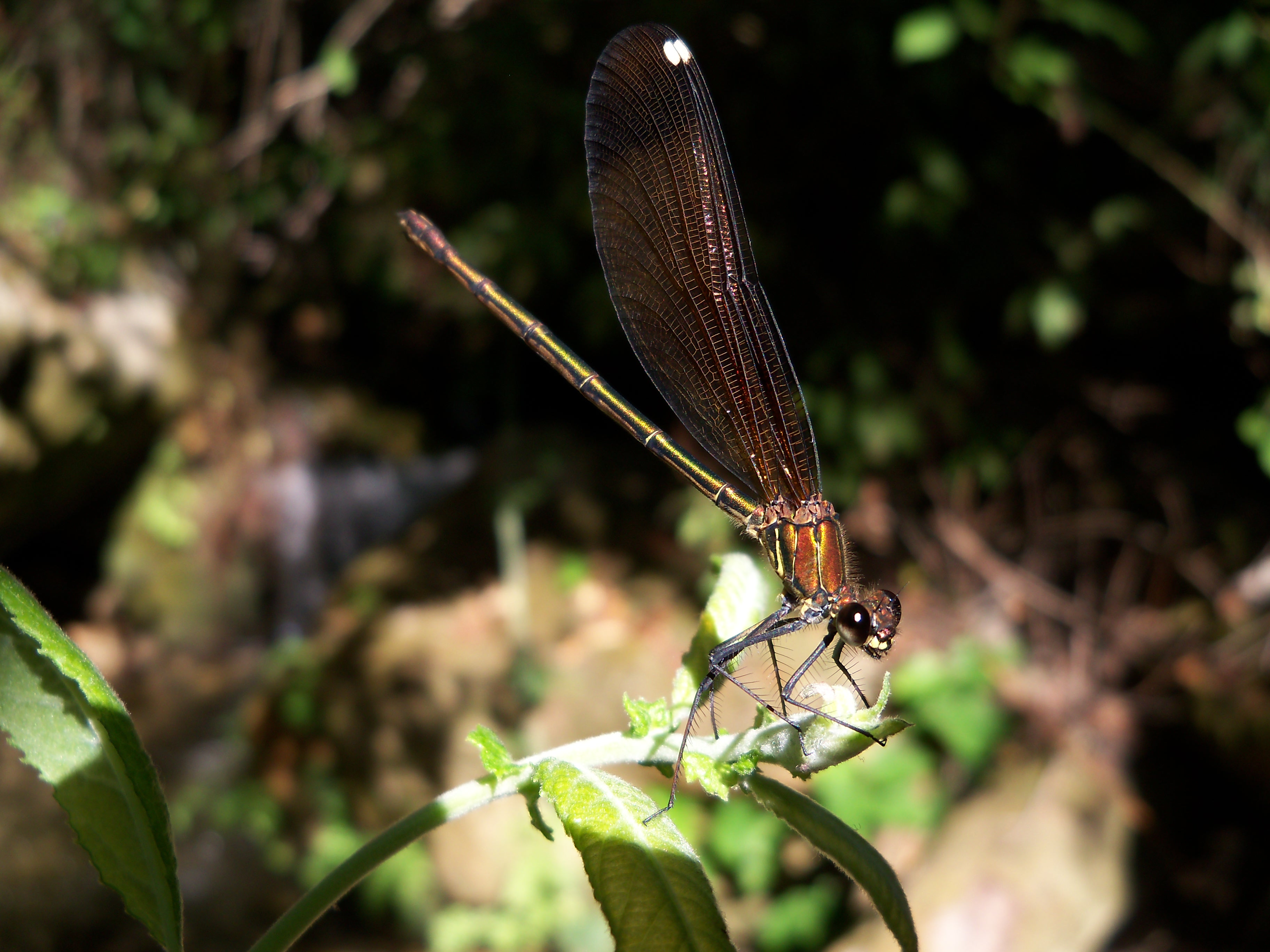
River fauna

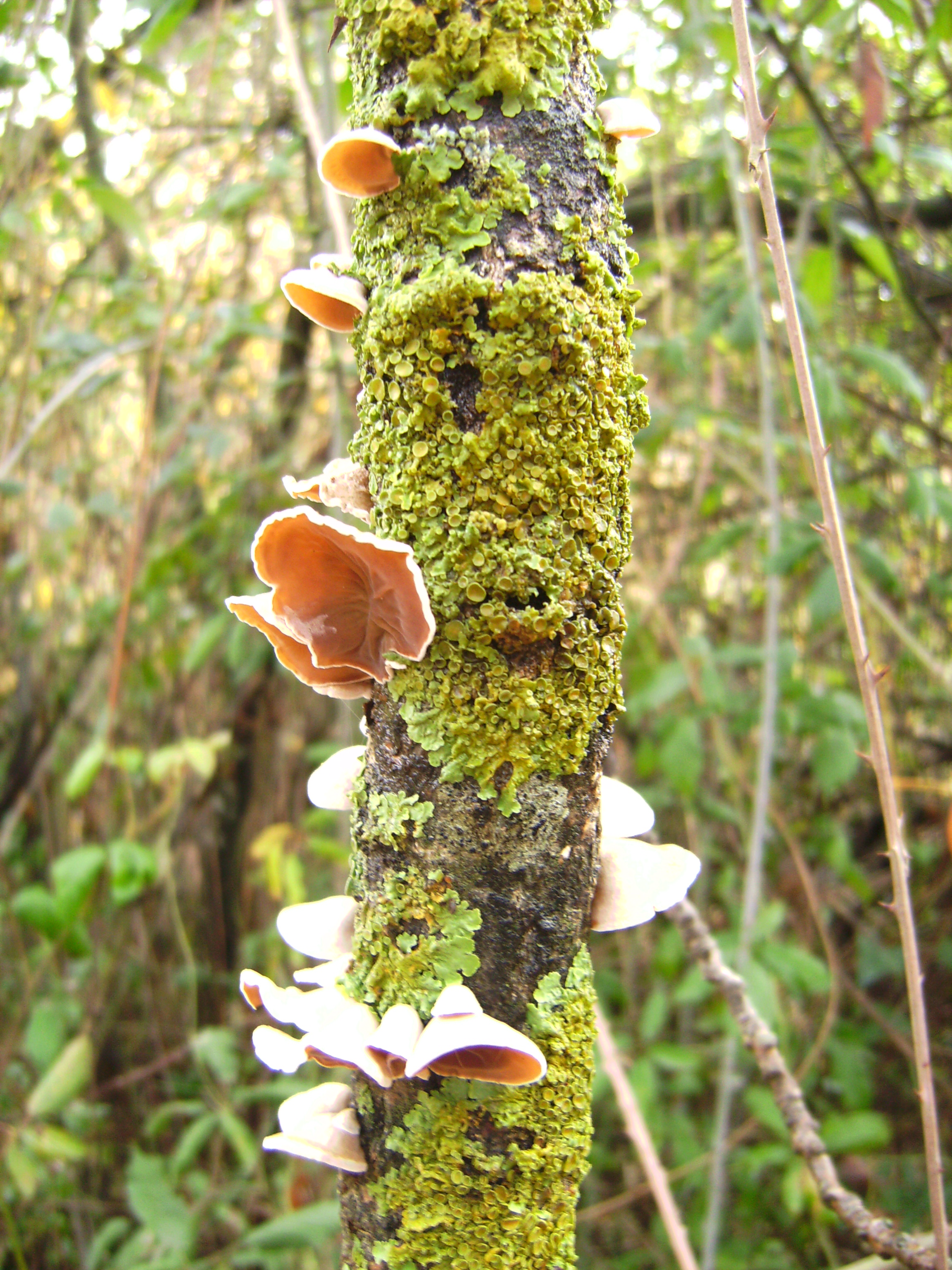
Fungus in El Bosque

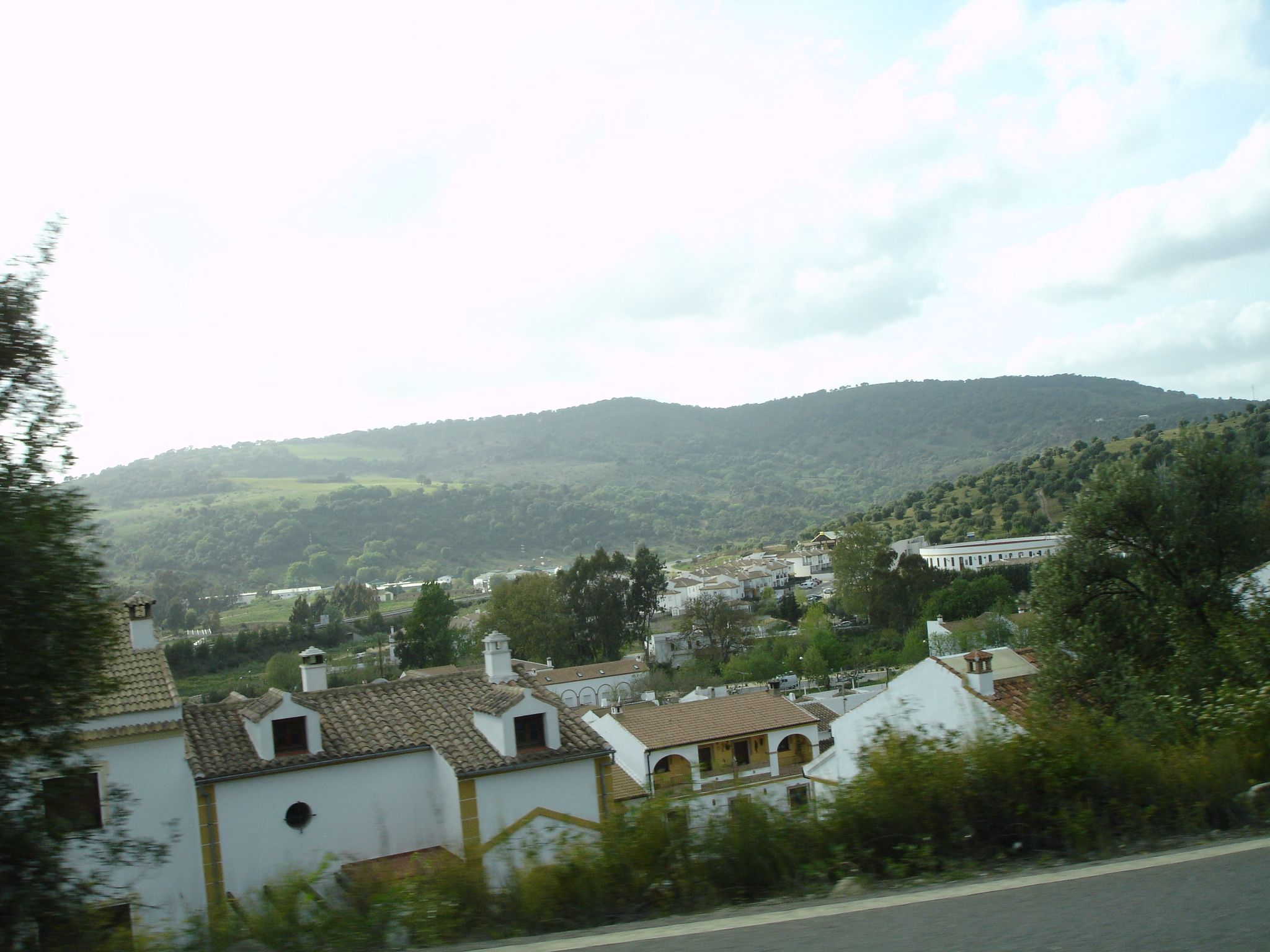
El Bosque from the road to Benamahoma

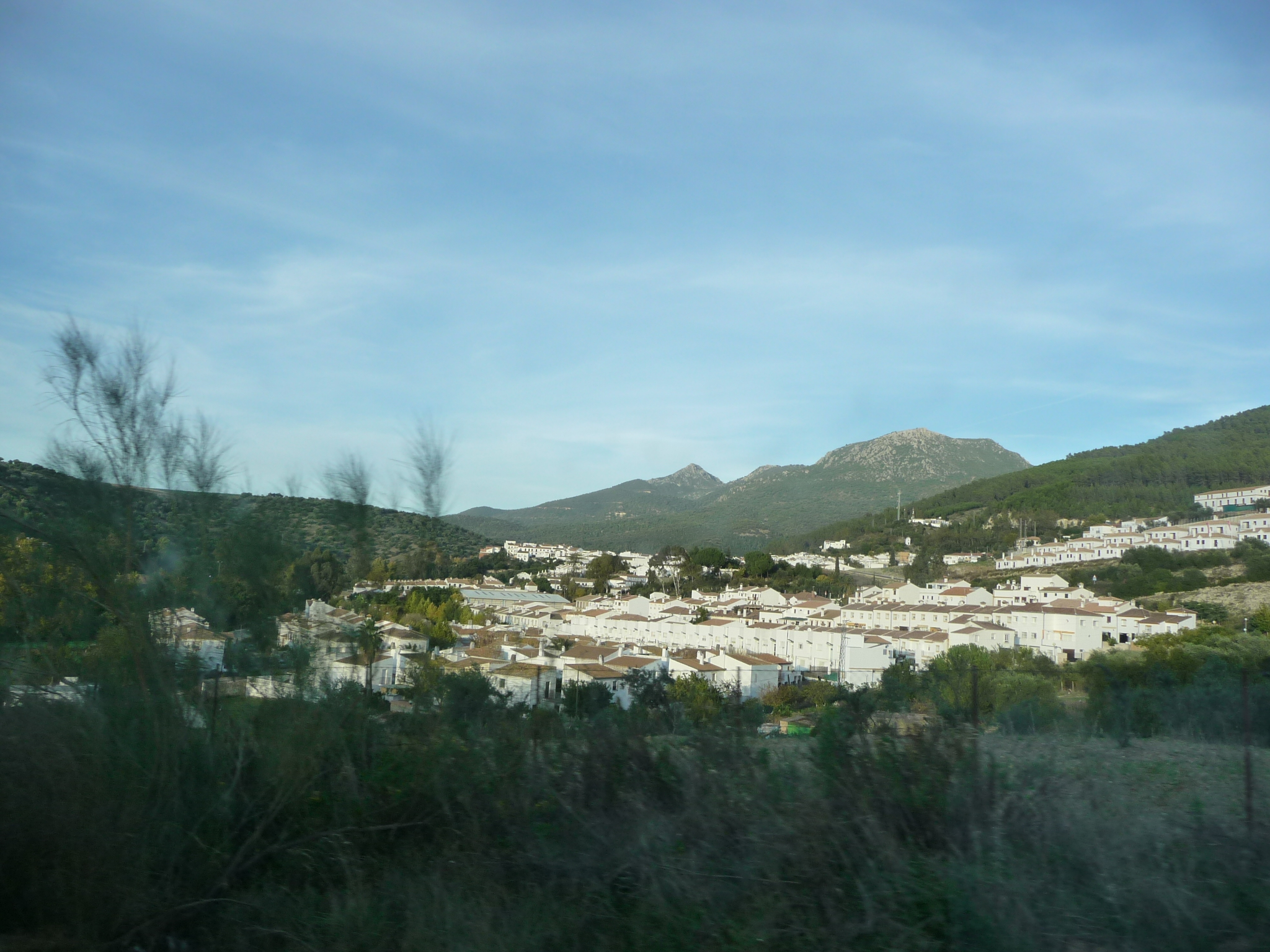

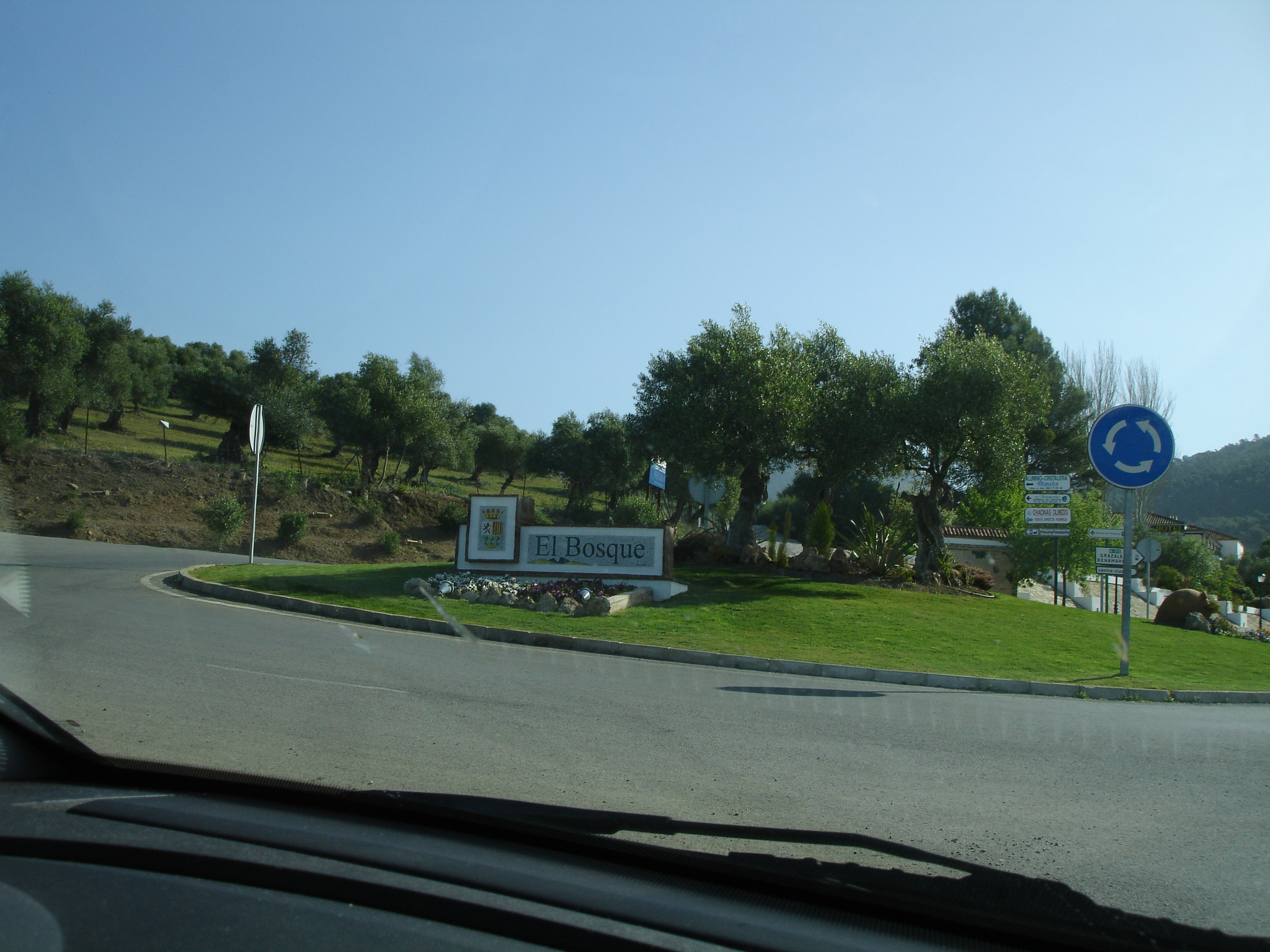
Entrance from road to Arcos de la Frontera

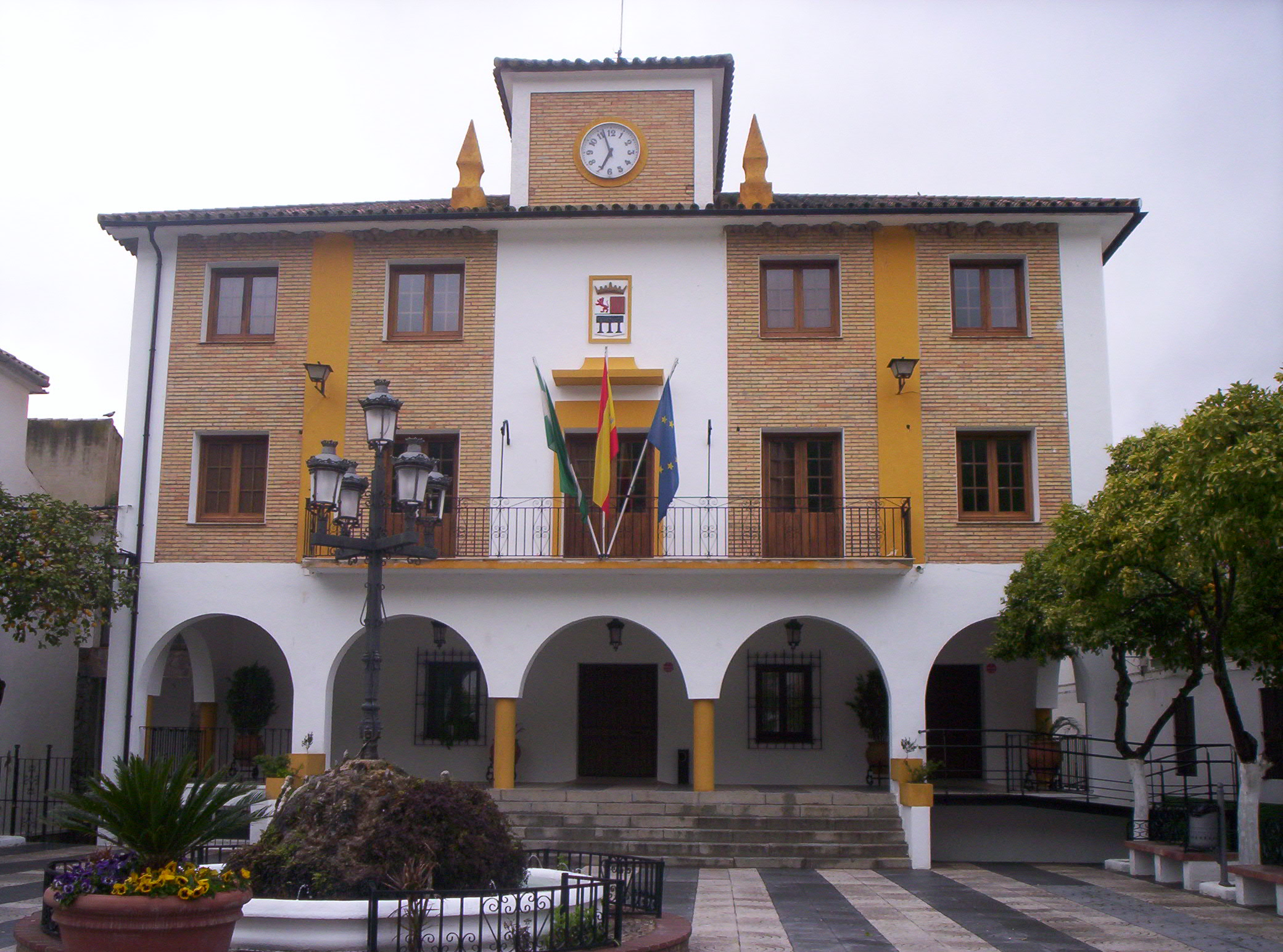
El Bosque town hall

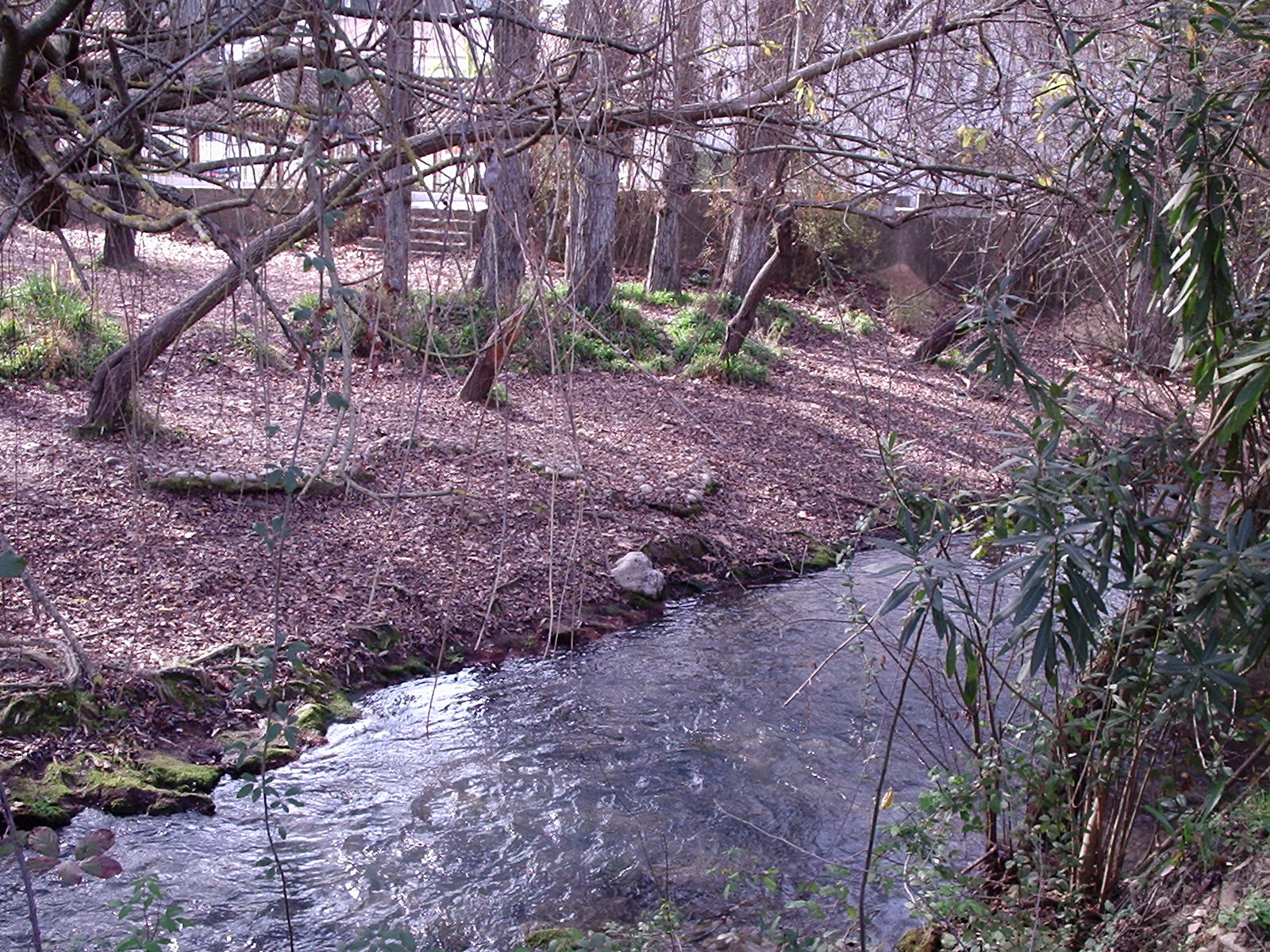
Majaceite river at El Bosque

== See also ==
- List of municipalities in Cádiz
