= Villamartín =

Villamartín, Spain
- Flag Coat of arms

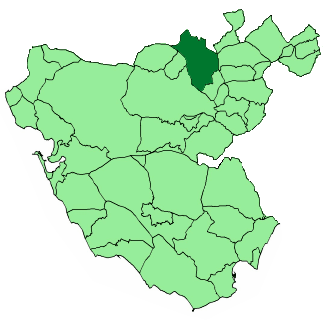
- Location of Villamartín
- Coordinates: 36°52′N 5°39′W
- Country: Spain
- Autonomous Community: Andalucía
- Municipality: Cádiz
- Comarca: Sierra de Cádiz

Government
  - Mayor: Juan Luis Morales Gallardo (AxSí)

Area
  - Total: 211.42 km^{2} (81.63 sq mi)
  - Land: 211.42 km^{2} (81.63 sq mi)
  - Water: 0.00 km^{2} (0 sq mi)

Population (2023)
  - Total: 12,165
  - Density: 57.539/km^{2} (149.03/sq mi)
- Time zone: UTC+1 (CET)
  - Summer (DST): UTC+2 (CEST)
- Postal code: 11650
- Website: www.villamartin.es

Villamartín is a city located in the province of Cádiz, Spain. According to the 2023 Register, the city has a population of 12,165 inhabitants. It is the location of Castle of Matrera.

== Demographics ==
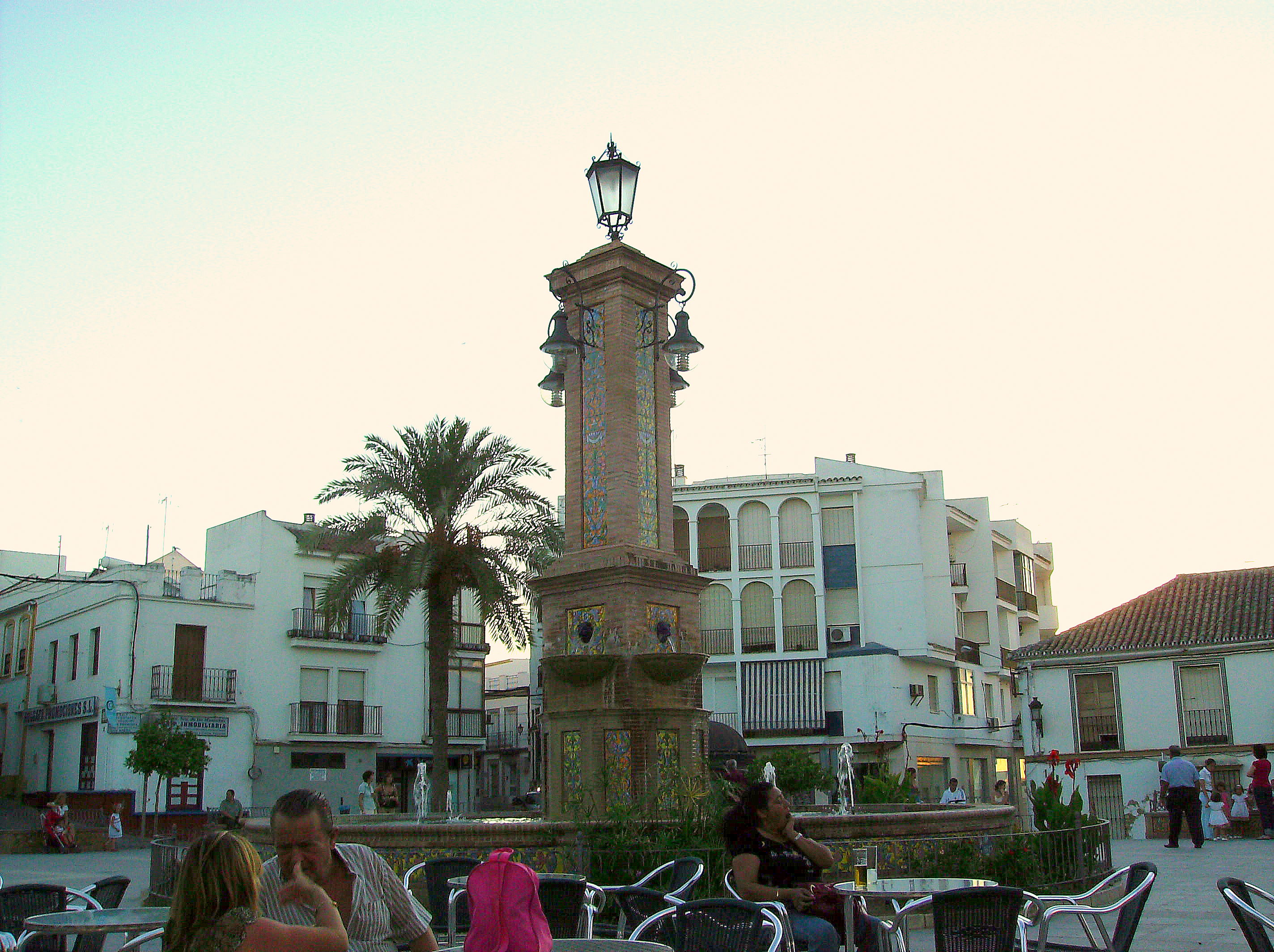
Square by the town hall

Historical population
Year	Pop.	±%
2001	11,954	—
2002	12,069	+1.0%
2003	12,069	+0.0%
2004	12,038	−0.3%
2005	12,145	+0.9%
2006	12,291	+1.2%
2007	12,362	+0.6%
Source: INE (Spain)

== See also ==
- List of municipalities in Cádiz
