= El Palmar de Vejer =

- Village
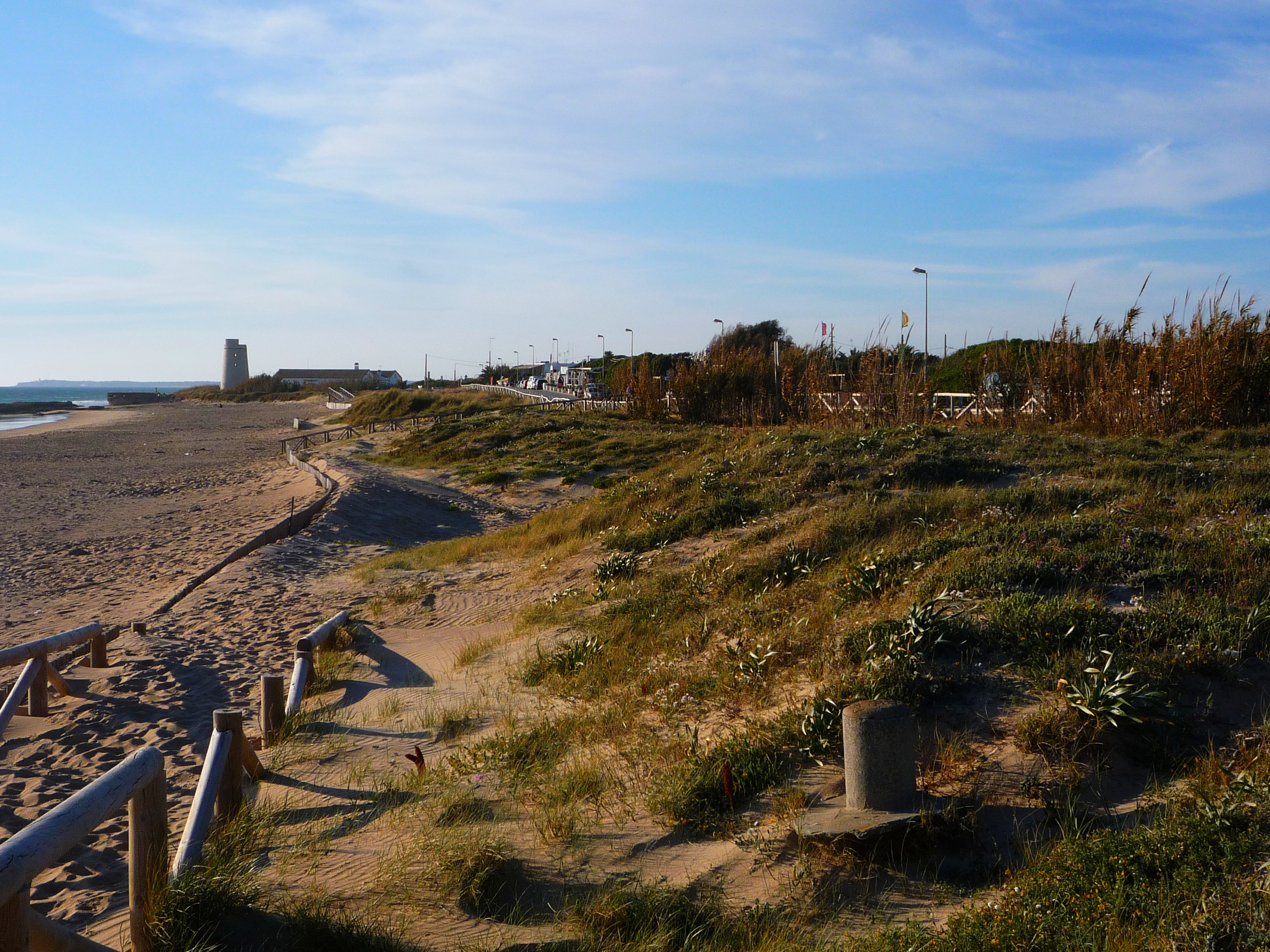

- Location within Province of Cádiz Location within Spain
- Coordinates: 36.235°N 6.065°W
- Country: Spain
- Autonomous community: Andalusia
- Province: Cádiz
- Comarca: La Janda
- Municipality: Vejer de la Frontera

Population (2015)
  - Total: 909
- Time zone: UTC+1 (CET)
  - Summer (DST): UTC+2 (CEST)
- Official language(s): Spanish

El Palmar de Vejer is a village in the municipality of Vejer de la Frontera in the Province of Cadiz, which stretches for 8 km along the Atlantic coast. It is 11 kilometers away from the municipality of Vejer de la Frontera (Cádiz, Spain), of which it is part.

== Geography ==
According to the national census, there were 909 inhabitants in El Palmar in 2015. It is located in the south of the province, between Conil de la Frontera and Zahora (Barbate). El Palmar is known for beet and wheat farming, as well as for its vast meadows, dotted with palm trees, where cattle graze.

== History ==
Historically, the village of El Palmar comprises a little rural core surrounded by the meadow that goes from the A-2233 county road to the beach. The area was complicated to access before the construction of the A-2233 county road. The only access from Conil, the closest village, involved crossing a river estuary, known as Río Salado, that connects with the sea. This was problematic because the area often flooded in the rainy season, making it impossible for cars and animals to traverse. Having been illegally built, some of the local residences were demolished in 2018.

== Economy ==
The main source of income is tourism, with the high season taking place in July and August. Services offered to tourists include several coastal restaurants where tourists can eat local dishes

El Palmar is often visited by surf, bodyboard, kite surf, paddle surf and kayak surf lovers. The windy conditions there, caused by the proximity to the Strait of Gibraltar, are ideal for these kinds of sports. The local surf breaker is known for its quality and predominant easterly winds. The high season takes place in the winter, from October to March. Especially famous in El Palmar are left waves, which are highly appreciated by the Spanish surfing community. In the summer, the area called La Torre is available for surfers, whereas the rest of the beach is reserved for sunbathers and swimmers. The white, fine-sand beaches are emblematic of the area.

== Gastronomy ==
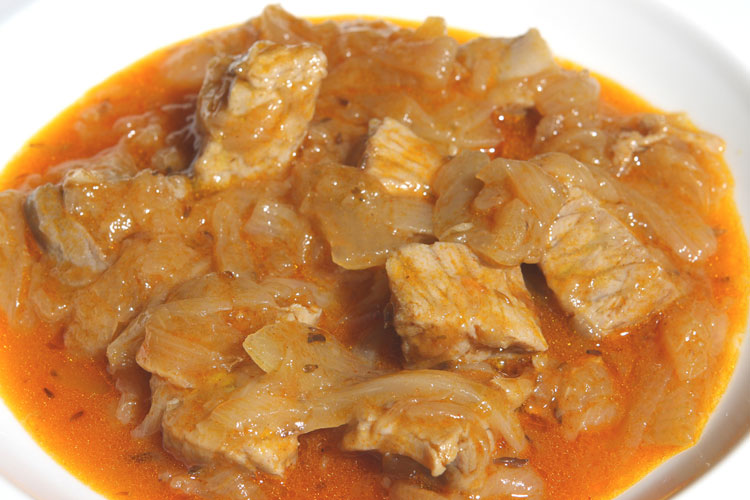
Atún encebollado, a typical dish of this village

El Palmar´s gastronomy is based on seafood, especially tunny fishery products. In the many local restaurants and bars, common dishes are: Tuna onion stew, a traditional local dish. Tuna with peas. Salted sea bream. Tuna and onion stew. Tuna flank. Salted or grilled snapper. Grilled swordfish.

== Culture ==
=== Festivals ===
- Following Cádiz province’s folklore, carnival in El Palmar is celebrated a week after that in Cádiz city, with dancing and costume contests.
- The May Fair is based on equestrian events and takes place in the month of May over a four-day period. There are fair marquee tents and fairground rides.
- Night of San Juan. After the burning of “Juanillos y Juanillas”, locals take a nocturnal dip in the sea, lit a bonfire at the beach and spend the night in good company.

== Leisure ==
The most popular aquatic sports are surfing, bodyboarding and kite surfing. Other newer sports such as paddle surfing and kayak surfing can also be practiced. El Palmar is probably the best place to surf in Andalusia, given its unique conditions. Due to the shape of the surrounding shore, El Palmar sea funnels the Andalusian wave currents, receives heavy surge, and is able to keep the swell longer. These optimal conditions for surfing are provided by the direction of the swell: west-southwest between 250 and 290 degrees, similar to the optimal swell conditions in the Canary Islands. Likewise, the most favorable wind condition is in the east-northeast direction, with the south wind being the least favorable. The best time of year to practice this sport is from winter to spring.

The beach has different surfing spots:

- La Torre: This watchtower, located at the north of the village, was used to defend the area and as a reference point since the 16th century, as it can be seen from any point on the beach. The sea in the area produces less swell, which makes it a great spot for days with big waves forecast. It provides clean and hollow waves when the rest of local surfing swells produce big waves. Although the waves can look small from the shore, they are really powerful, especially the lip wave.
- Alferez (roundabout, aid station): The central area of the beach has been named after a local bar and first aid station. Here, surfers benefit from more swell than in La Torre, so the conditions are ideal when swell is moderate. When swell is intense, the waves keep their quality, but surfers will find difficulty in making it to the sea due to the strong currents created by several spots in the beach break. Although wave quality is high, the fact that it is a beach break must be taken into consideration.
- El Dorado: The left area of the beach is the spot that produces the largest swell. When waves are choppy, people tend to go to the northern area of La Torre. Nevertheless, this is an excellent spot when they are not, due to its well-formed waves.

== Patrimony ==
=== El Palmar Beach ===
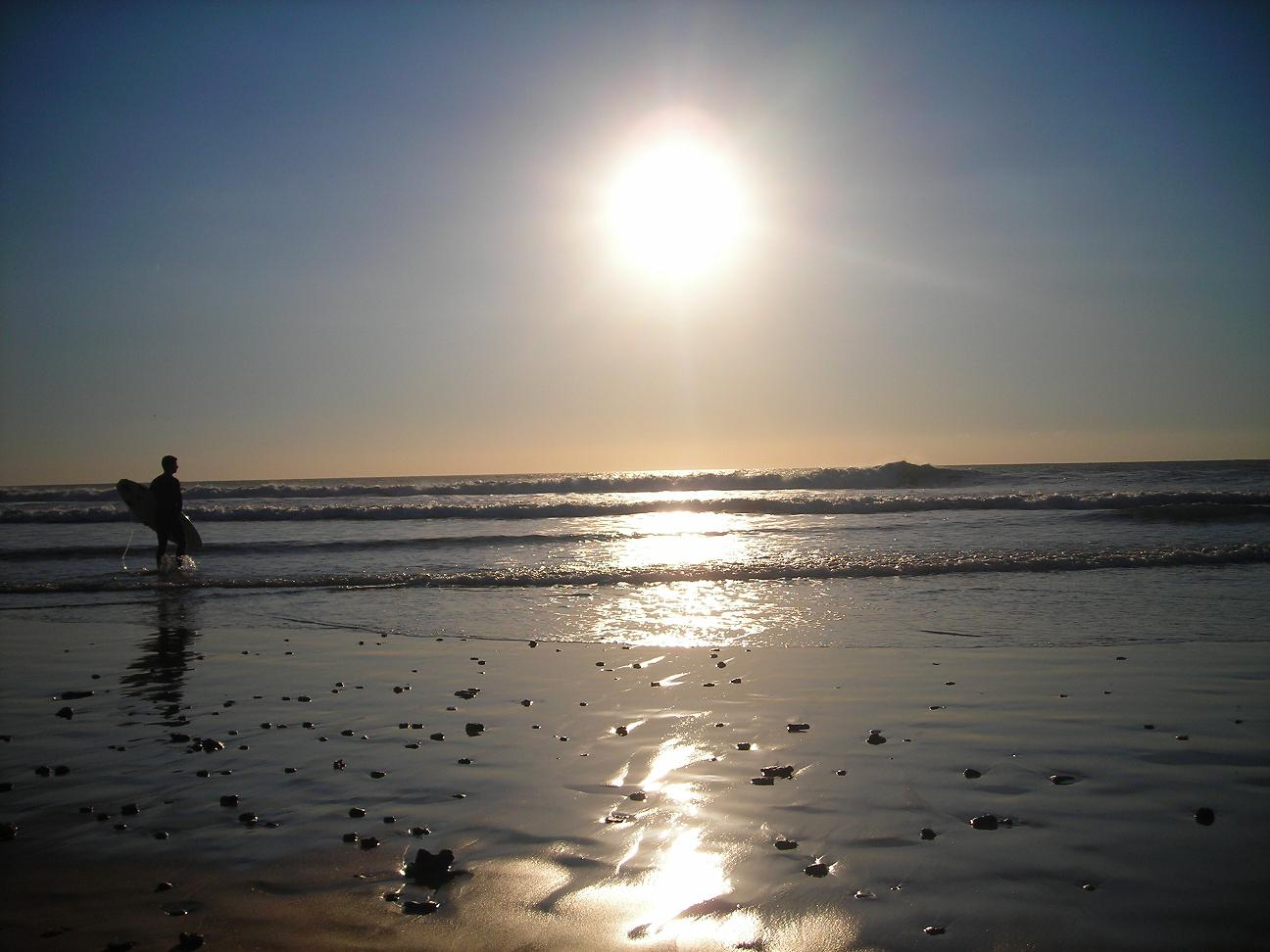
El Palmar beach

El Palmar beach is made of fine, white sand, and is one of the longest in the La Janda region. It is 4,200 meters long and 80 meters wide in many cases. The water is clean and not too deep in most parts. Although there are no private residences, the area has many public services such as supermarkets, a pharmacy, restaurants, inns, lifeguards, a first aid station, a police station, a beach cleaning service, access gateways, danger signs, parking, among others. The beach is delimited by natural dunes, where access gateways have been built to improve their preservation. That is why El Palmar beach was granted the “Q” distinction of touristic quality by the Institute of the Spanish Touristic Quality, after enhancing the services provided at the beach. The implementation and follow-up of the project for the Quality Management System was completed in 2008. The beach is divided into zones with significant differences. From north to south, it goes from Castilnovo beach (Conil de la Frontera) to the tower of Torrenueva, which is a less crowded area normally frequented by families. Closer move to Castilnovo, the beach becomes quieter. It is near the main access to El Palmar that the majority of surf schools and restaurants are located. In the summer, the zone is frequented by young people, surfers and families resting. Finally, the area between El Baba and Mangueta beach (part of the municipality of Barbate) is quiet, perfect for a relaxing walk. The local flora and fauna are threatened by many invasive species.

=== Torre Almenara ===
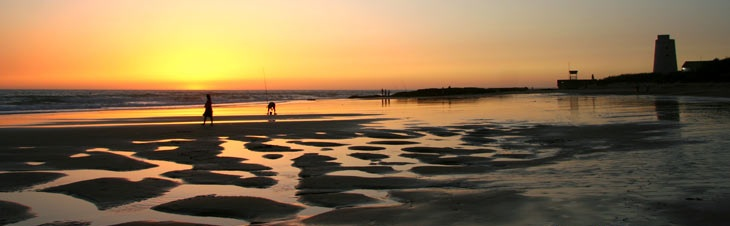
Torre Almenara on the background

The “Torre Nueva” or “Torre de El Palmar” is one of the most typical coastal watchtowers in Cádiz province. It was built in the 16th century to alert the population in case of danger, mainly from the arrival of Berber pirates, using fire as a form of communication between the towers. It fell into disuse in the 19th century. As its name implies, the “Torre Nueva” tower was built after other towers in the area. The access door is a few meters high, opposite the shore. Thus, it was easier to defend in the event of siege. During the 20th century, the tower was left to gradually fall into ruin. The tower has since been renovated.

== Transport ==
There is a bus line that connects Cádiz with El Palmar. The route as well has bus stops at San Fernando, Chiclana, San Andrés Golf, El Colorado and Conil before reaching El Palmar. The timetable is valid from Monday to Friday from the 3 September 2012.

== Communications ==
Since 2020, the village has a local radio station and a local magazine.

== Conflict ==
In recent years, a conflict between the City Council of Vejer and the PELP platform has arisen. Currently, there is a huge economic project pending planning permission in the beach area. The project involves the construction of a large holiday resort. In opposition to the project, there is a huge group of people defending the area, who claim that such a construction would mean the end of the beautiful natural park. On the other hand, those who support the project say that it is an economic necessity in the area. While the economic crisis and environmentalists´ efforts seemed to have stopped the project for some time, it was resumed in 2019.

Salvarelpalmar.es has carried out protests against it, and reported complaints to the Andalusian, Spanish and European Authorities, the Spanish Environmental Prosecutor, and the European Commission for the Environment (who are completing a thorough study of the project´s effects). In addition, the zone has been declared an IBA (important bird area) by the SEO (Spanish Association of Ornithology).
