= La Janda =

- Comarca
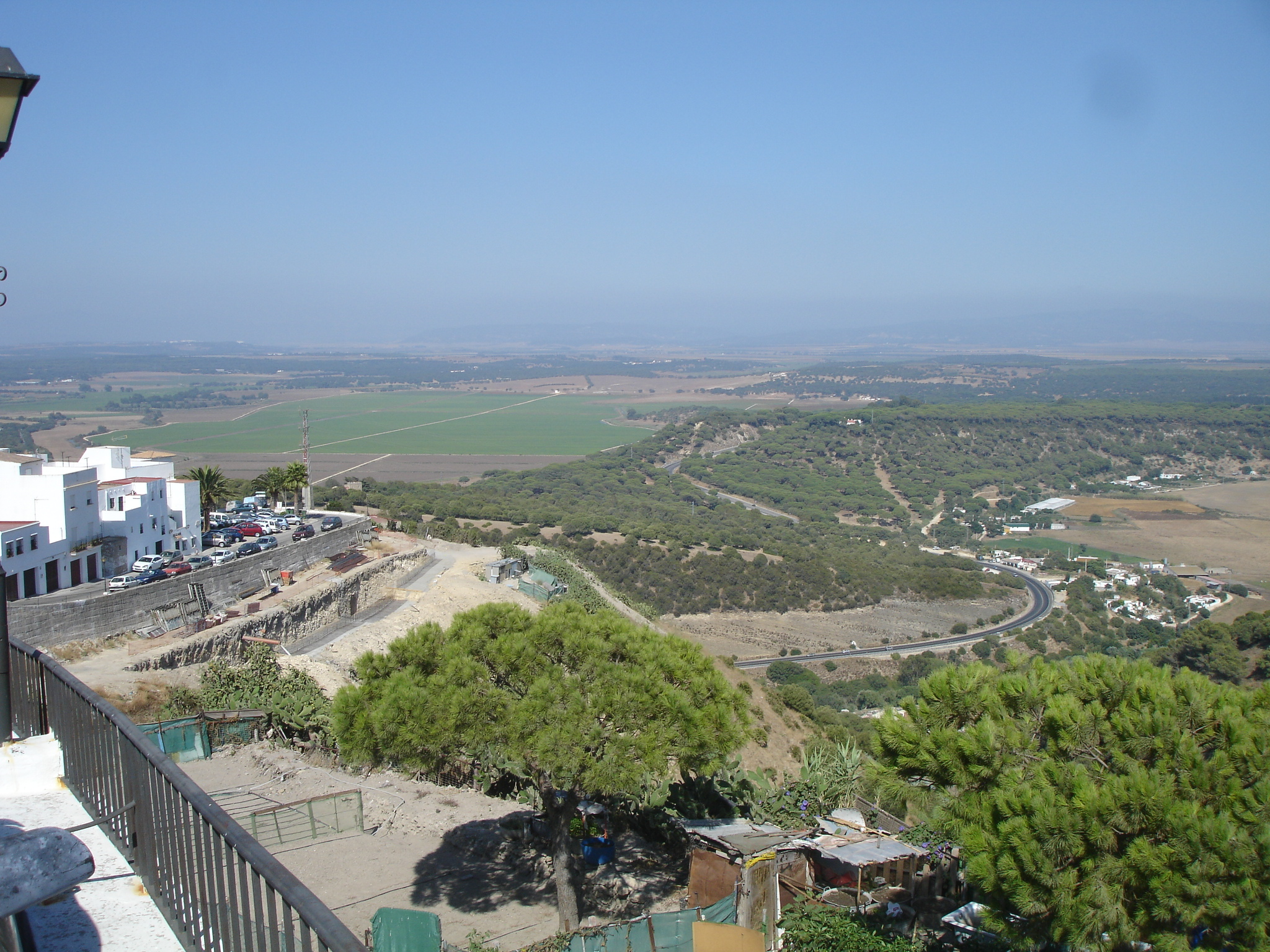
- View of La Janda from Vejer de la Frontera

- Location of La Janda in Andalusia, Spain

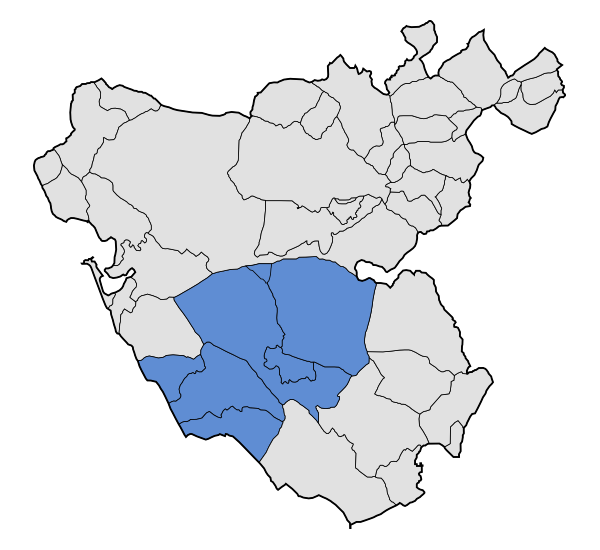
- Location of La Janda in the province of Cádiz
- Coordinates: 36°27′N 5°55′W
- Country: Spain
- Autonomous community: Andalusia
- Province: Cádiz
- Municipalities: List: Alcalá de los Gazules, Barbate, Benalup-Casas Viejas, Conil de la Frontera, Medina Sidonia, Paterna de Rivera, Vejer de la Frontera

Area
  - Total: 1,335 km^{2} (515 sq mi)

Population (2023) (Note: Estimate at 1 January 2023: National Statistics Institute (Spain).)
  - Total: 88,884
  - Density: 66.58/km^{2} (172.4/sq mi)
- Time zone: UTC+1 (CET)
  - Summer (DST): UTC+2 (CEST)

La Janda is one of the six comarcas (county, but with no administrative role) in the province of Cádiz, southern Spain. It was established in 2003 by the Government of Andalusia.

== Municipalities ==
La Janda consists of the following municipalities:

Arms	Municipality	Area (Km^{2})	Population (2023) (Note: Estimate at 1 January 2023: National Statistics Institute (Spain).)	Density (/Km^{2})
	Alcalá de los Gazules	479.59	5,205	10.85
	Barbate	142.17	22,811	160.45
	Benalup-Casas Viejas	60.70	7,164	118.02
	Conil de la Frontera	88.51	23,661	267.33
	Medina Sidonia	493	11,738	23.81
	Paterna de Rivera	14	5,441	388.64
	Vejer de la Frontera	58	12,864	221.79
	Total	1,335.97	88,884	66.53

== Gallery ==
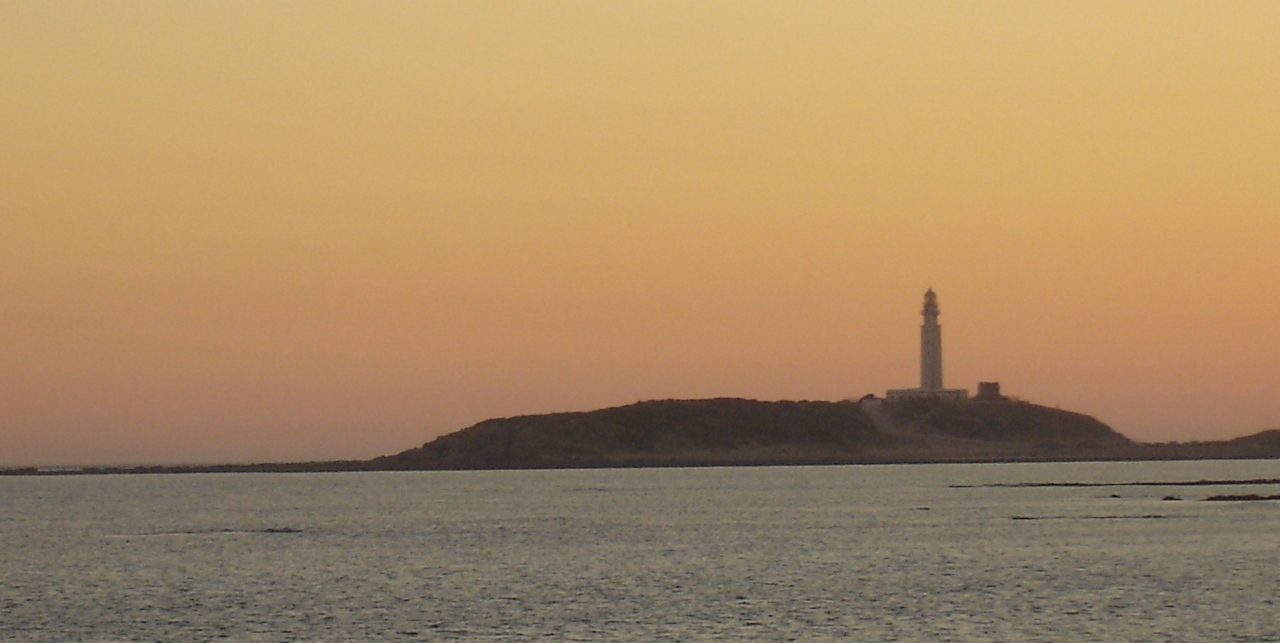
Cape Trafalgar

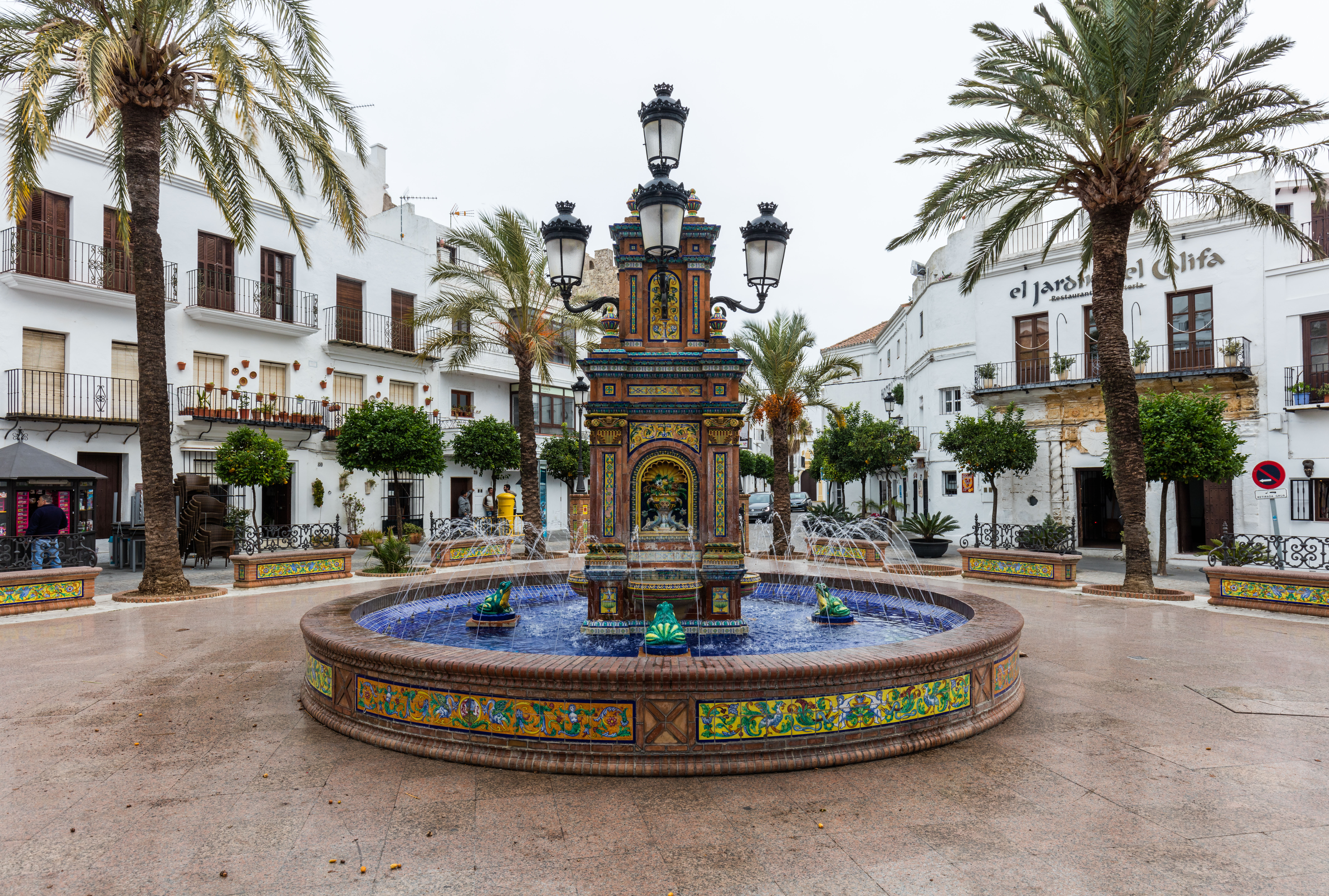
Vejer de la Frontera

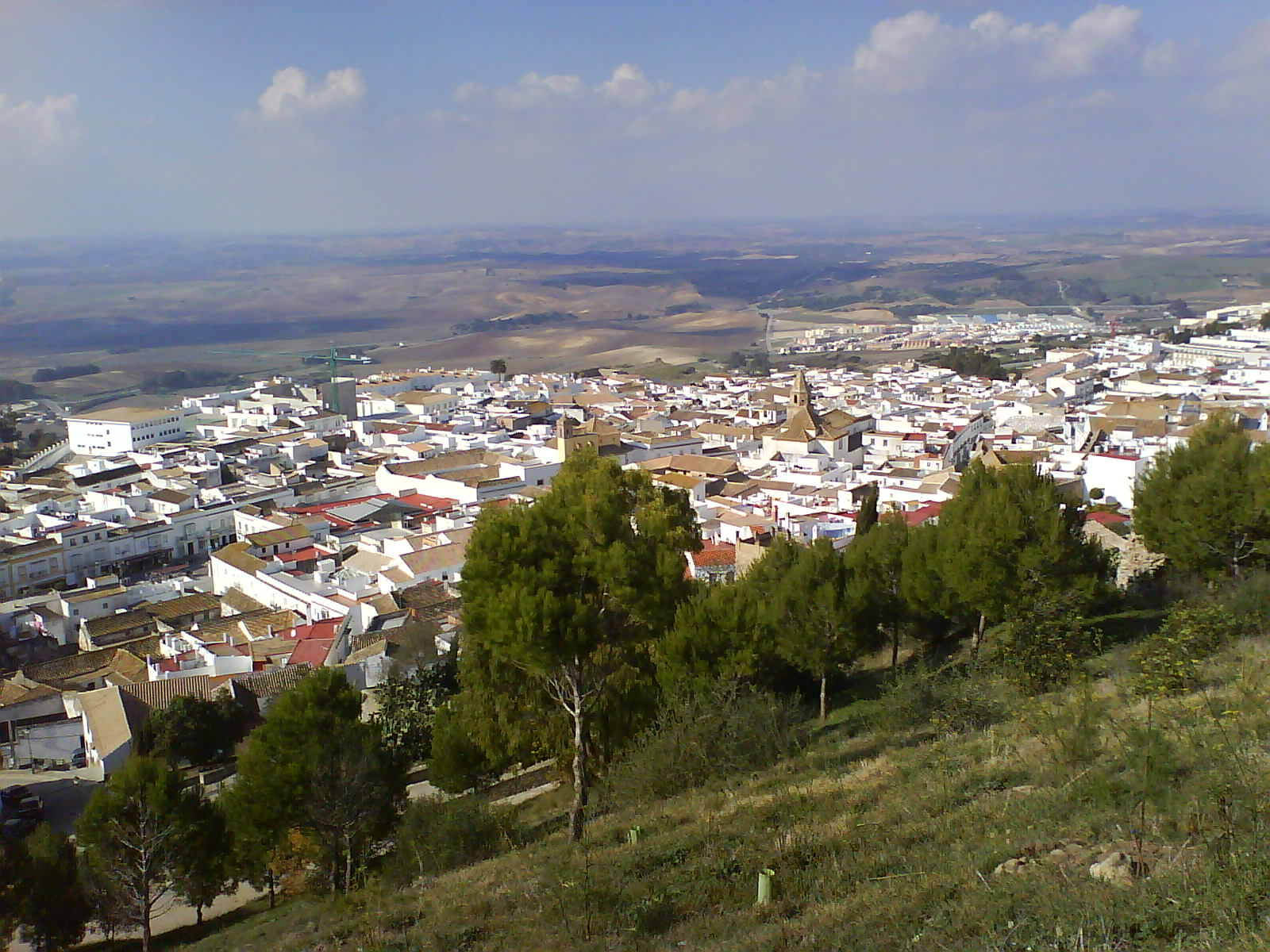
Medina Sidonia

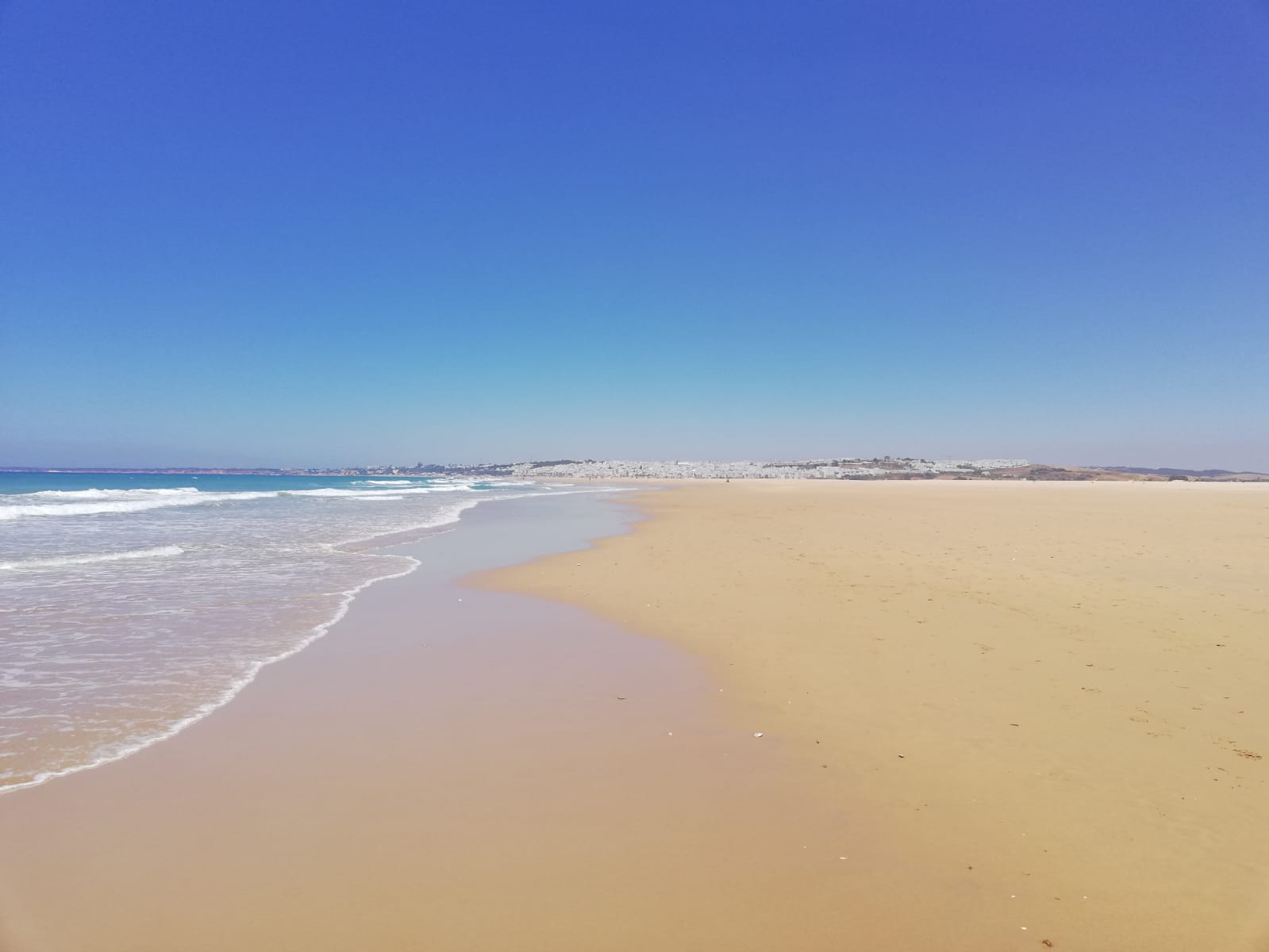
Conil de la Frontera coast
