= Laetitia du Couëdic =

Franco-Swiss equestrian rider

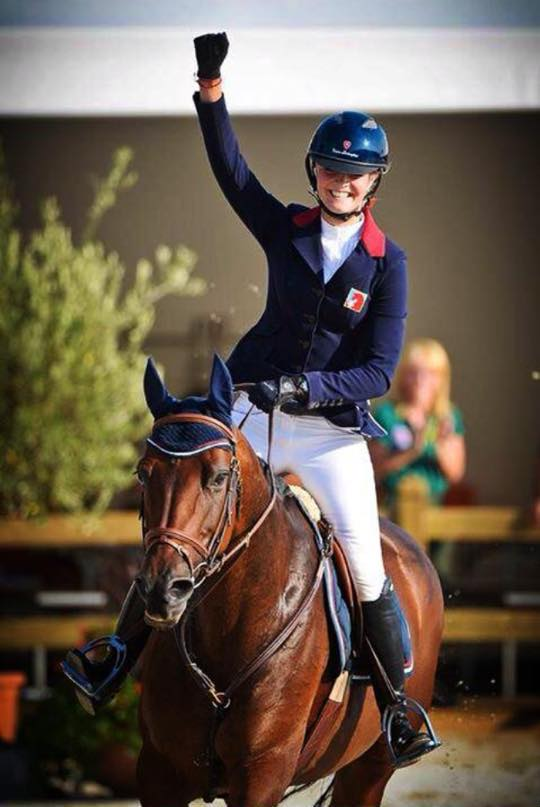
- Laetitia du Couedic on Elisa in 2013

Personal information
- Nationality: France Switzerland Canada
- Discipline: show jumping
- Born: June 6, 1996 (age 30); Toronto, Ontario
- Horse(s): Cheyenne 111 Z*HDC, Elisa
Medal record
Show Jumping Europe Championship for Young Riders
Gold medal – first place	2013 - Vejer de la Frontera Spain	Team jumping
Show Jumping Switzerland Junior Championships
Gold medal – first place	2013 - Lugano Switzerland	Individual jumping

Laetitia du Couëdic de Kerérant (born 6 June 1996) is a Franco-Swiss equestrian rider. Her specialty is show jumping, either individually or as part of a team. She was Swiss junior champion in Lugano Switzerland in August 2013, a month after she won a gold medal at The European championship (Swiss team) at Vejer de la Frontera Spain. Laetitia du Couëdic started her official CSI programme in 2015 at the CSI5* in Zurich riding Elisa followed by Cagnes-sur-mer France on her recently acquired (From French Champion Kevin Staut, her mentor) Cheyenne 111 Z HDC. In October 2013, she won the Grand Prix U25 CSI at Chevenez (JU) and was a wild card entry for the CHI Geneva in Geneva where she was the youngest rider. Laetitia du Couëdic is ambassador of Hermès, the French Luxury goods maker. She is also an ambassador of JustWorld international, a charity project. In 2017 she won the Fontainebleau Grand Prix (CSIOY - Fontainebleau (FRA) (04/05/2017 - 07/05/2017) and was Bronze medal at Swiss championships (young riders). Laetitia has been selected for the Swiss team competing at the European Championships in Samorin (Slovakia) where she ranked 17th. She rides regularly the "Saut Hermès" in Paris, The Rolex Grand-Prix in Geneva.

== Biography ==
Laetitia du Couëdic was born in Toronto, Canada at Mount Sinai Hospital. She grew up in Geneva, Switzerland and graduated her "Maturité Fédérale" . She has been riding as a professional since. Her parents are Anne-Catherine Spillmann and Gonzague du Couëdic. Laetita, in 2019, joined Haras de la Chesnaye where she trains temporarily her horses.

== Horses ==
2018

Name	FEI id	Age Born	Gender	Color	StudBook
Updating please be patient					

2017

Name	FEI id	Age-Born	Gender	Color	StudBook
CHEYENNE 111 Z	103IT13	12 - 12/08/2003	Female	Bay	Stud-book Zangersheide
ELISA	102SR87	11 - 29/04/2004	Female	Bay	Belgisch Warmbloedpaard v.z.w.
ARIZONA STAR	105MO54	7 - 18/04/2010	Male	Chestnut	SF - Stud Book du Cheval Selle Français (ANSF)
JACKSON	104RW29	8 - 06/05/2009	Gelding	Chestnut	-

2016

Name	FEI id	Age-Born	Gender	Color	StudBook
CHEYENNE 111 Z	103IT13	12 - 12/08/2003	Female	Bay	Stud-book Zangersheide
ELISA	102SR87	11 - 29/04/2004	Female	Bay	Belgisch Warmbloedpaard v.z.w.
RIYADH'SUN	105DT47	6 - 04/05/2010	Male	Bay	Zuchtverband CH-Sportpferde ZVCH Swiss Warmblood

2015

Name	FEI id	Age-Born	Gender	Color	StudBook
CADDY Z	104BI13	8 - 04/08/2007	Female	Bay	Stud-book Zangersheide
CHEYENNE 111 Z	103IT13	12 - 12/08/2003	Female	Bay	Stud-book Zangersheide
ELISA	102SR87	11 - 29/04/2004	Female	Bay	Belgisch Warmbloedpaard v.z.w.
ROSE DE ROCHE CH	103PM35	11 - 19/04/2004	Female	Bay	Zuchtverband CH-Sportpferde ZVCH Swiss Warmblood
VERDICT DE KEZEG	104WF39	6 - 15/05/2009	Male	Bay	Stud-book Français du Cheval Selle Français (ANSF)

2014

Name	FEI id	Age-Born	Gender	Color	StudBook
CADDY Z	104BI13	8 - 04/08/2007	Female	Bay	Stud-book Zangersheide
CHANAH CH	103XW00	8 - 22/04/2007	Female	Bay	Zuchtverband CH-Sportpferde ZVCH Swiss Warmblood
ELISA	102SR87	11 - 29/04/2004	Female	Bay	Belgisch Warmbloedpaard v.z.w.
GHANA VD KORNELISHOEVE	103LG54	9 - 14/06/2006	Female	Grey	Belgisch Warmbloedpaard v.z.w.
HASJ D'O	104FR18	8 - 28/04/2007	Male	Black	Belgisch Warmbloedpaard v.z.w.
QUEN DIRA T ON	103EK25	12 - 22/04/2003	Male	Chestnut	Verband der Züchter des Oldenburger Pferdes e.V.
ROSE DE ROCHE CH	103PM35	11 - 19/04/2004	Female	Bay	Zuchtverband CH-Sportpferde ZVCH Swiss Warmblood

2013

Name	FEI id	Age-Born	Gender	Color	StudBook
CHANAH CH	103XW00	8 - 22/04/2007	Female	Bay	Zuchtverband CH-Sportpferde ZVCH Swiss Warmblood
ELISA	102SR87	11 - 29/04/2004	Female	Bay	Belgisch Warmbloedpaard v.z.w.
FASHION	103ER24	10 - 28/04/2005	Female	Bay	Belgisch Warmbloedpaard v.z.w.
ROSE DE ROCHE CH	103PM35	11 - 19/04/2004	Female	Bay	Zuchtverband CH-Sportpferde ZVCH Swiss Warmblood

== Results ==
2017

1st - Grand Prix Classic, Fontainebleau (France) May 7, 2017, (CSIOY Table A (238.2.2a) 1.45m)

All results
