= Route of the Bull =

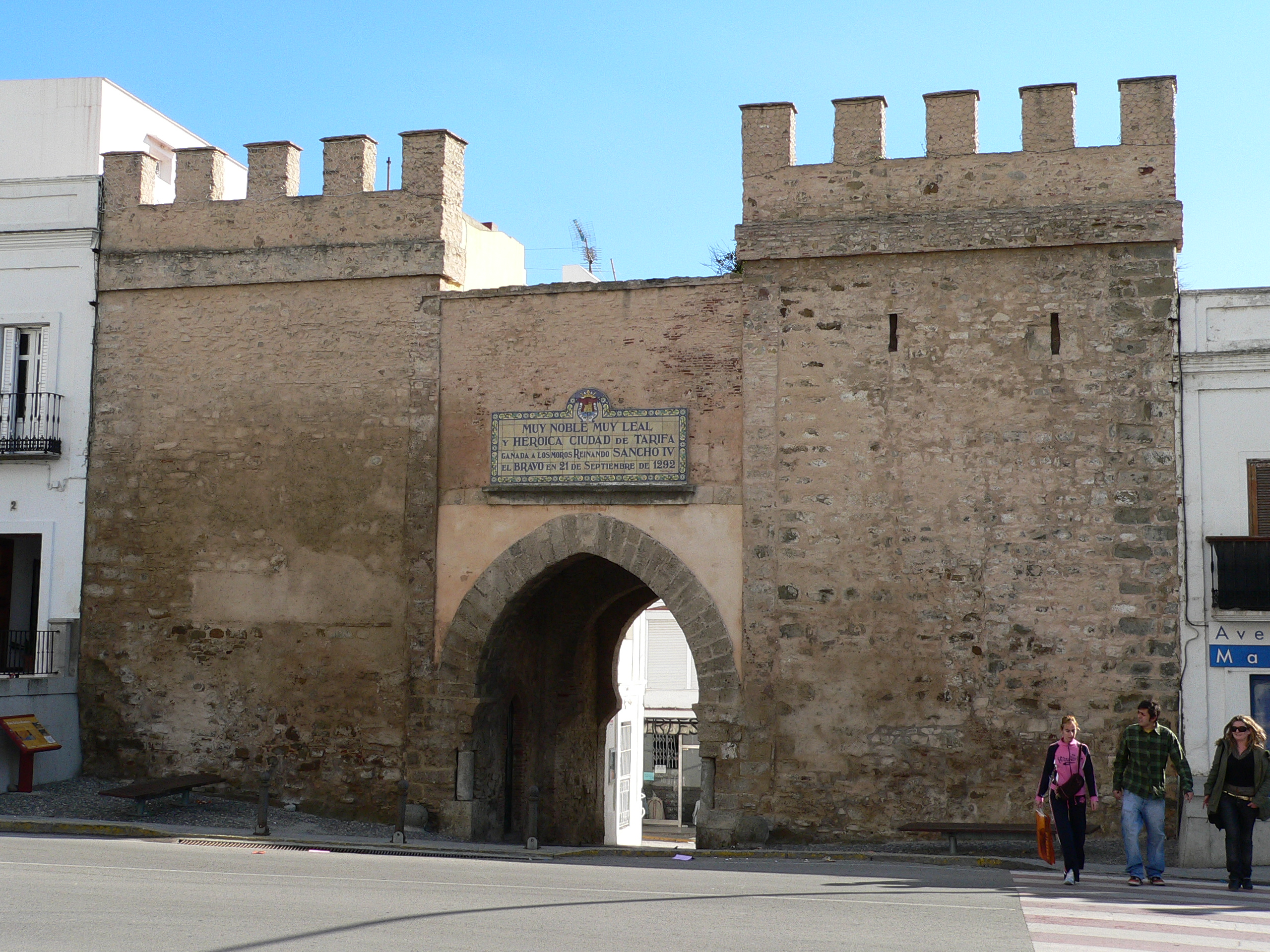
Arco de Tarifa

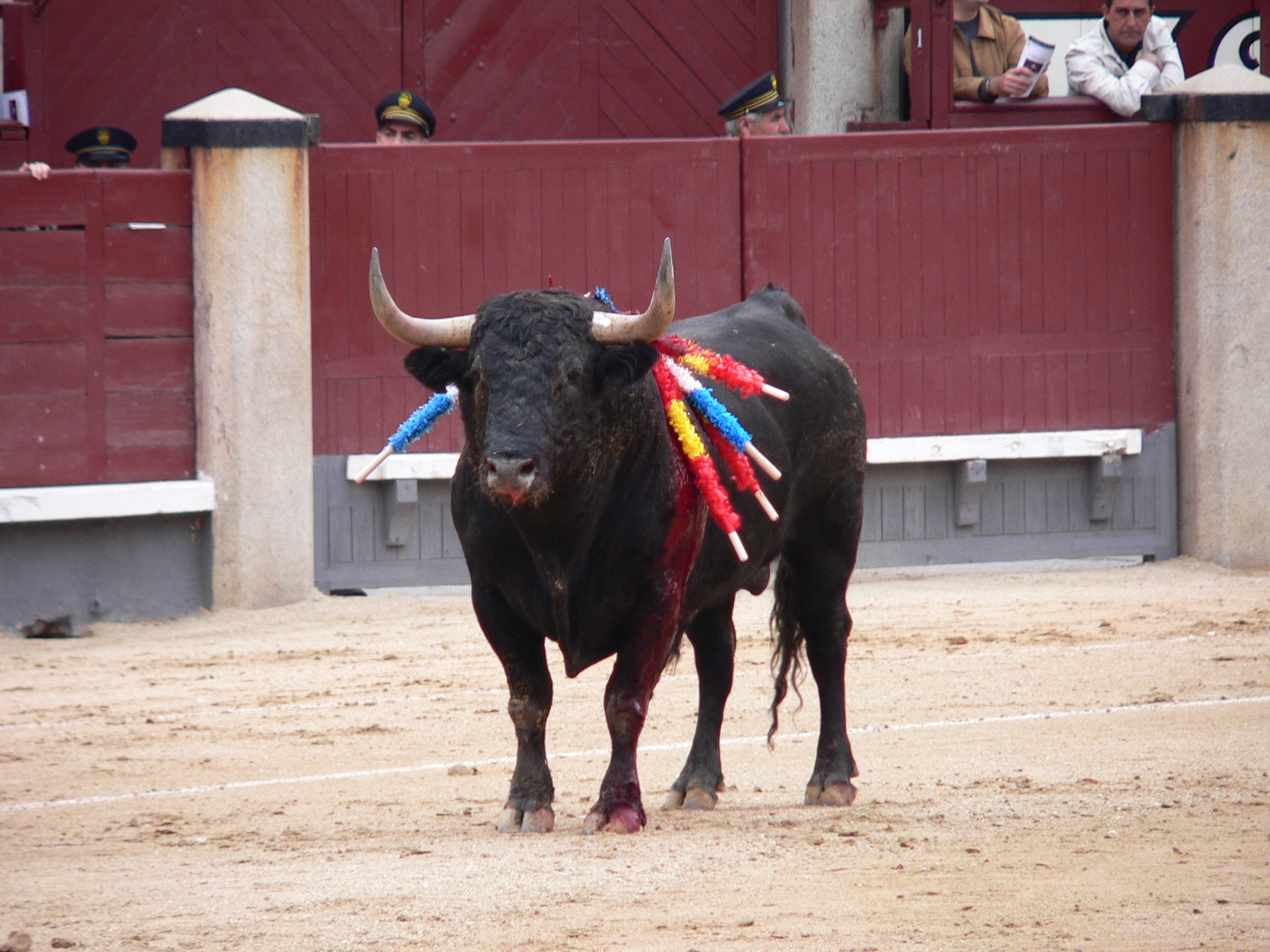
A fighting bull in his last minutes of life

The Route of the Bull (in Spanish, Ruta del Toro) is a tourist trail in the province of Cádiz, Spain, that traverses the areas where fighting bulls are raised. These bulls, used in bullfights (corridas) throughout Spain, are of a breed native to Spain, a breed also appreciated for its beef. The Route of the Bull is meant to direct tourists through landscapes where it is possible to observe these totemic animals in their natural habitat, but the scenery of the countryside, and the points of historical and cultural interest along the way, make following the route worthwhile even for the visitor who finds the notion of the bullfight off-putting.

The trail runs between Jerez de la Frontera and Tarifa, and it passes through the municipalities of San José del Valle, Paterna de Rivera, Medina Sidonia, Benalup-Casas Viejas, Alcalá de los Gazules, Jimena de la Frontera, Castellar de la Frontera, San Roque and Los Barrios.

Another tourist trail of this sort is the route that wanders through the pueblos blancos of the province of Cádiz, the so-called White Towns of Andalusia.
