= List of municipalities in Cádiz =

Map of Spain with the province of Cádiz highlighted

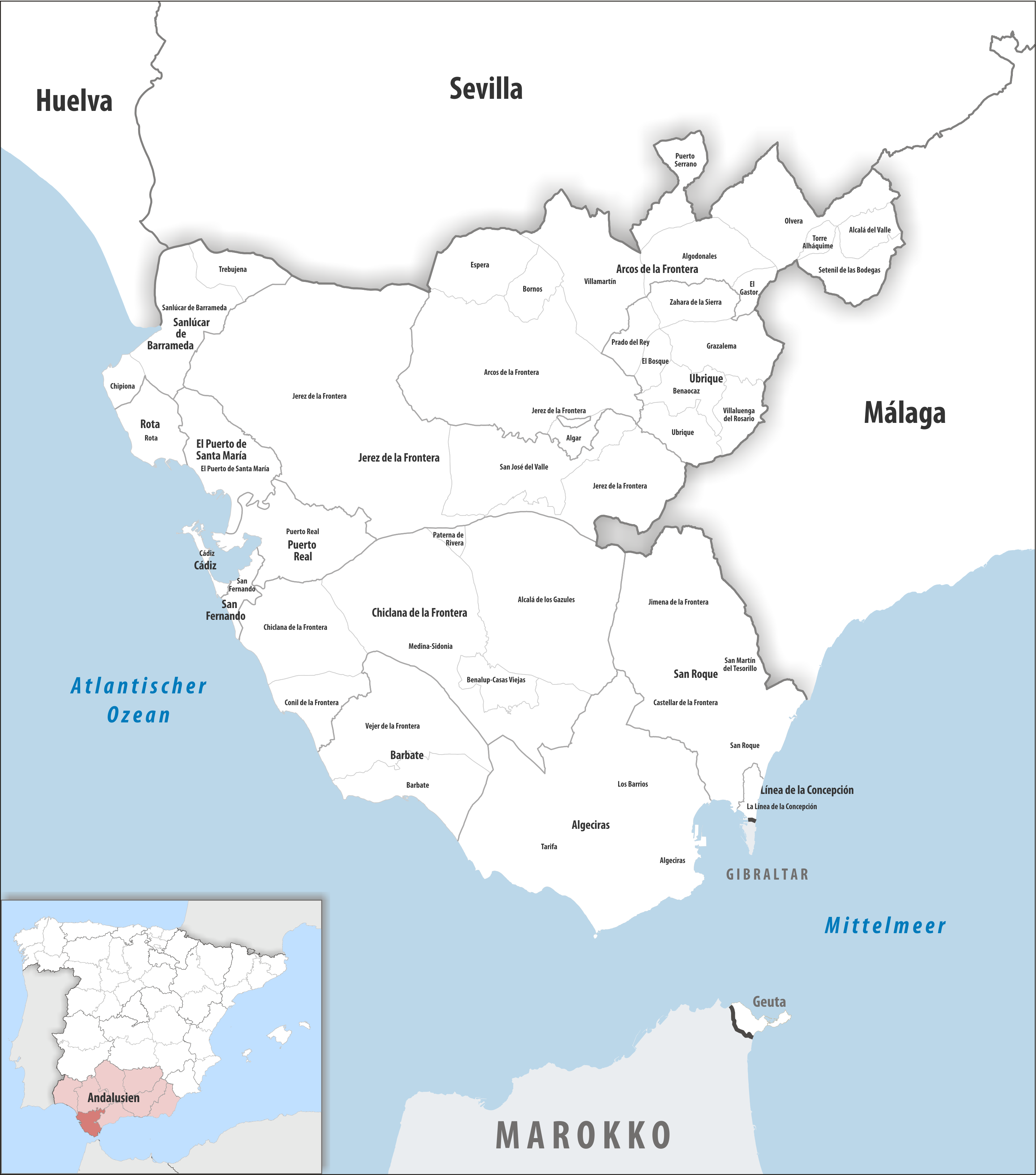
Map of the municipalities in the province of Cádiz

Cádiz is a province in the autonomous community of Andalusia, Spain. The province is divided into 45 municipalities. As of the 2024 Spanish census, Cádiz is the 8th most populous of Spain's 50 provinces, with 1,258,730 inhabitants, and the 34th largest by land area, spanning 7,439.76 square kilometres (2,872.51 sq mi). Municipalities are the most basic local political division in Spain and can only belong to one province. They enjoy a large degree of autonomy in their local administration, being in charge of tasks such as urban planning, water supply, lighting, roads, local police, and firefighting.

The organisation of municipalities in Spain is outlined by the local government law Ley 7/1985, de 2 de abril, Reguladora de las Bases del Régimen Local (transl. Law 7/1985, of 2 April, Regulating the Bases of the Local Administration), which was passed by the Cortes Generales—Spain's national parliament—on 2 April 1985 and finalised by royal decree on 18 April 1986. Municipalities in Cádiz are also governed by the Statute of Autonomy of Andalusia, which includes provisions concerning their relations with Andalusia's autonomous government. All citizens of Spain are required to register in the municipality in which they reside. Each municipality is a corporation (Note: Within the context of local government in Spain, a corporation is a legal entity representing a municipality. Each municipality is empowered to govern over a specific piece of land and its population.) with independent legal personhood: its governing body is called the ayuntamiento (municipal council or corporation), a term often also used to refer to the municipal offices (city and town halls). The ayuntamiento is composed of the mayor (Spanish: alcalde), the deputy mayors (tenientes de alcalde) and the councillors (concejales), who form the plenary (pleno), the deliberative body. Municipalities are categorised by population for determining the number of councillors: three when the population is up to 100 inhabitants, five for 101–250, seven for 251–1,000, nine for 1,001–2,000, eleven for 2,001–5,000, thirteen for 5,001–10,000, seventeen for 10,001–20,000, twenty-one for 20,001–50,000, and twenty-five for 50,001–100,000. One councillor is added for every additional 100,000 inhabitants, with a further one included if the total would otherwise be even, to avoid tied votes.

The mayor and the deputy mayors are elected by the plenary assembly, which is itself elected by universal suffrage. Elections in municipalities with more than 250 inhabitants are carried out following a proportional representation system with closed lists, whilst those with a population lower than 250 use a block plurality voting system with open lists. The plenary assembly must meet periodically, with meetings occurring more or less frequently depending on the population of the municipality: monthly for those whose population is larger than 20,000, once every two months if it ranges between 5,001 and 20,000, and once every three months if it does not exceed 5,000. Many ayuntamientos also have a local governing board (Spanish: junta de gobierno local), which is appointed by the mayor from amongst the councillors and is required for municipalities of over 5,000 inhabitants. The board, whose role is to assist the mayor between meetings of the plenary assembly, may not include more than one third of the councillors.

The largest municipality by population in the province as of the 2024 Spanish census is Jerez de la Frontera, with 214,844 residents, while the smallest is Villaluenga del Rosario, with 467 residents. The largest municipality by area is also Jerez de la Frontera, which spans 1,187.92 square kilometres (458.66 sq mi), while Cádiz, the province's capital, is the smallest at 12.30 square kilometres (4.75 sq mi).

== Municipalities ==
Largest municipalities in the province of Cádiz by population

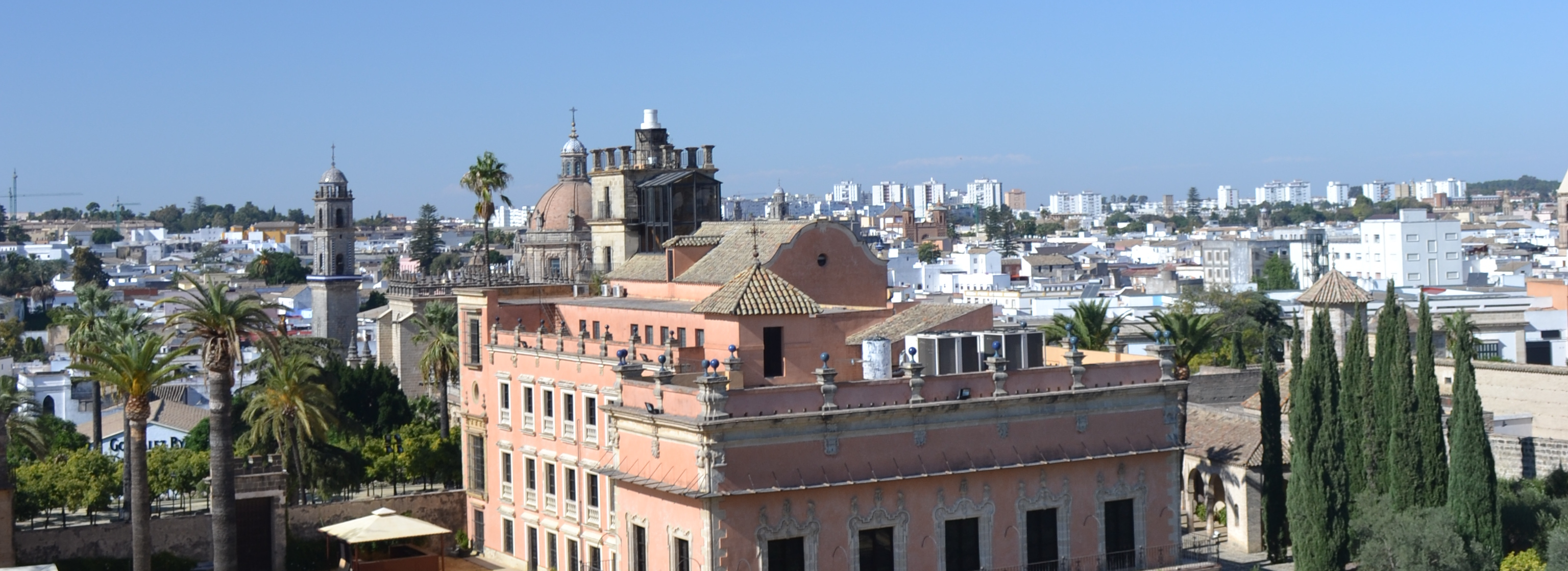
Jerez de la Frontera is the province's largest municipality by population.

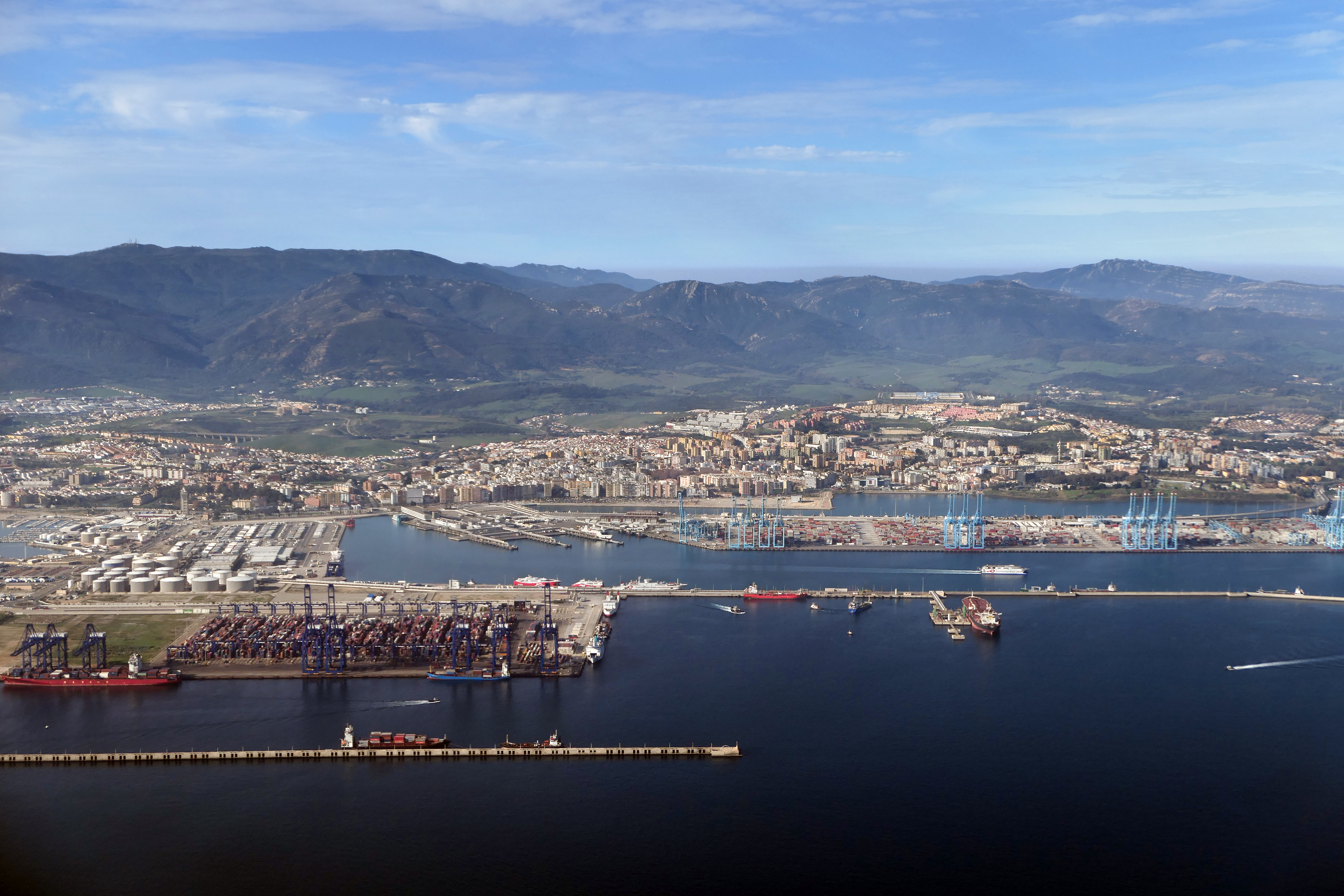
Algeciras, the second largest municipality by population in the province of Cádiz

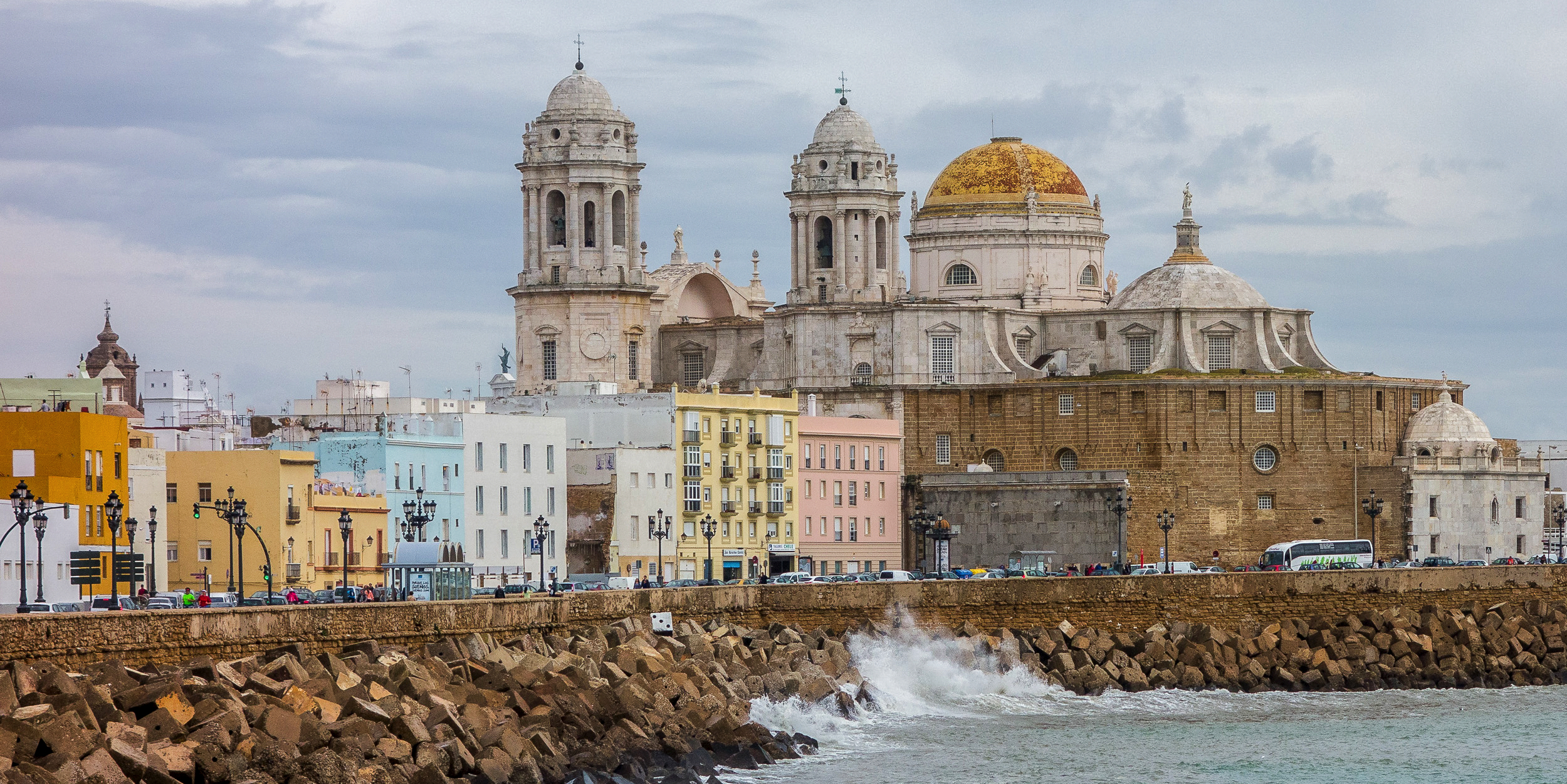
Cádiz is the province's capital and third largest municipality by population.

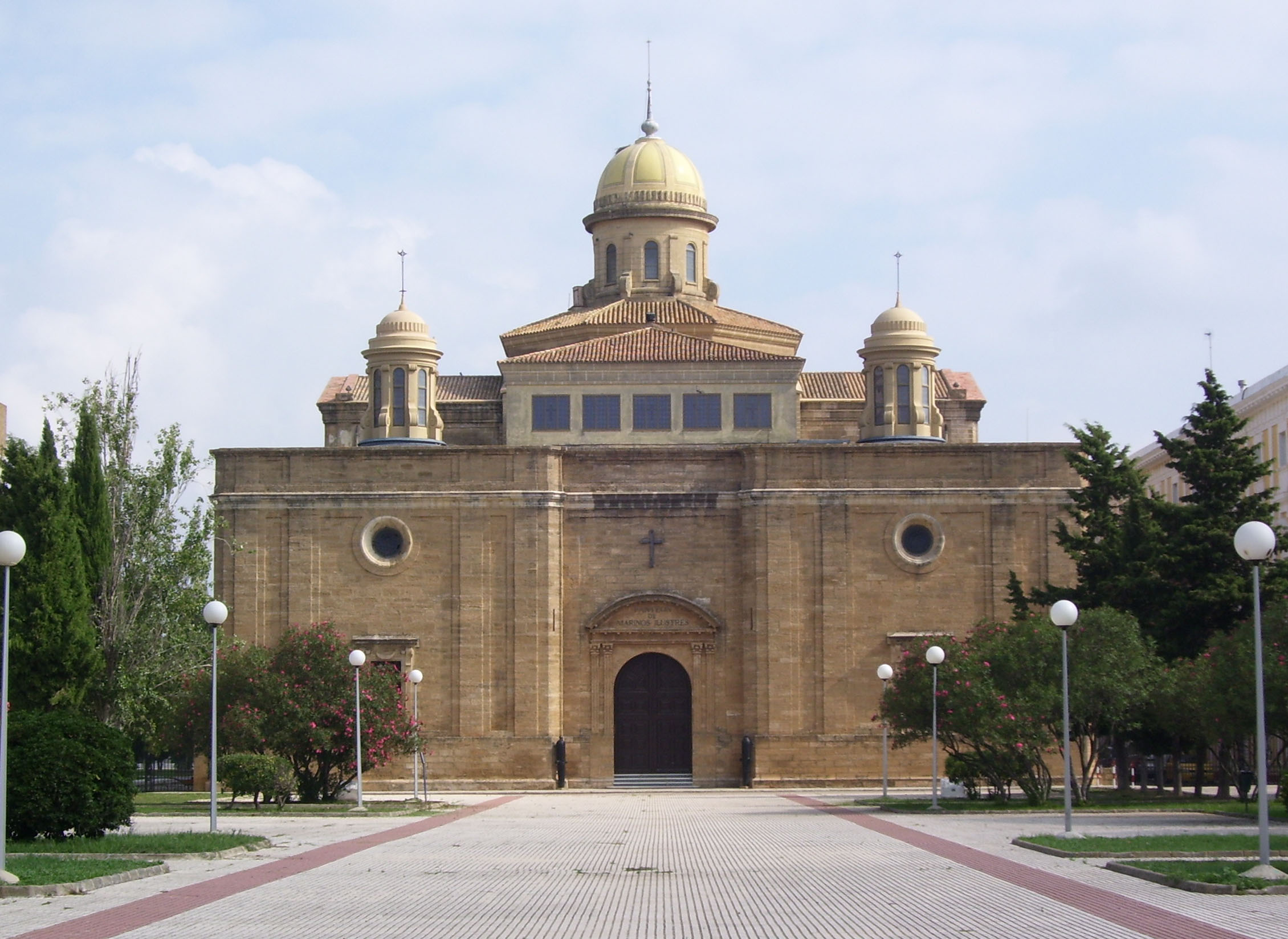
San Fernando, the province of Cádiz's fourth largest municipality by population

† Provincial capital

Municipalities in the province of Cádiz
Name	Population (2024 census)	Population (2011 census)	Population change	Land area (km^{2})	Population density (2024)
Alcalá de los Gazules	5,231	5,525	−5.3%	479.07	10.9/km^{2}
Alcalá del Valle	4,932	5,286	−6.7%	46.89	105.2/km^{2}
Algar	1,445	1,500	−3.7%	26.72	54.1/km^{2}
Algeciras	125,047	117,695	+6.2%	87.96	1,421.6/km^{2}
Algodonales	5,437	5,756	−5.5%	134.45	40.4/km^{2}
Arcos de la Frontera	31,055	31,368	−1.0%	526.82	58.9/km^{2}
Barbate	22,725	22,904	−0.8%	142.17	159.8/km^{2}
Los Barrios	24,540	22,988	+6.8%	330.70	74.2/km^{2}
Benalup-Casas Viejas	7,272	7,223	+0.7%	60.37	120.5/km^{2}
Benaocaz	761	737	+3.3%	69.39	11.0/km^{2}
Bornos	7,532	8,107	−7.1%	55.09	136.7/km^{2}
El Bosque	2,249	2,094	+7.4%	30.75	73.1/km^{2}
Cádiz†	111,180	124,014	−10.3%	12.30	9,039.0/km^{2}
Castellar de la Frontera	2,990	3,160	−5.4%	180.51	16.6/km^{2}
Chiclana de la Frontera	89,805	80,769	+11.2%	206.77	434.3/km^{2}
Chipiona	19,915	18,815	+5.8%	33.12	601.3/km^{2}
Conil de la Frontera	24,042	21,755	+10.5%	87.37	275.2/km^{2}
Espera	3,776	3,954	−4.5%	123.44	30.6/km^{2}
El Gastor	1,706	1,849	−7.7%	27.54	61.9/km^{2}
Grazalema	2,007	2,197	−8.6%	122.41	16.4/km^{2}
Jerez de la Frontera	214,844	211,784	+1.4%	1,187.92	180.9/km^{2}
Jimena de la Frontera	6,788	10,112	−32.9%	298.42	22.7/km^{2}
La Línea de la Concepción	64,987	65,412	−0.6%	26.67	2,436.7/km^{2}
Medina Sidonia	11,806	11,843	−0.3%	487.63	24.2/km^{2}
Olvera	7,849	8,467	−7.3%	193.69	40.5/km^{2}
Paterna de Rivera	5,516	5,652	−2.4%	13.83	398.8/km^{2}
Prado del Rey	5,702	5,935	−3.9%	48.58	117.4/km^{2}
El Puerto de Santa María	90,423	89,012	+1.6%	159.09	568.4/km^{2}
Puerto Real	42,095	41,299	+1.9%	195.97	214.8/km^{2}
Puerto Serrano	6,891	7,201	−4.3%	79.84	86.3/km^{2}
Rota	29,960	29,169	+2.7%	84.19	355.9/km^{2}
San Fernando	93,793	96,786	−3.1%	29.91	3,135.8/km^{2}
San José del Valle	4,469	4,446	+0.5%	223.74	20.0/km^{2}
Sanlúcar de Barrameda	69,887	67,232	+3.9%	171.39	407.8/km^{2}
San Martín del Tesorillo	2,754	No data (Note: San Martín del Tesorillo was partitioned from Jimena de la Frontera and became an independent municipality in 2018 and is thus not included in the 2011 census.)		48.44	56.9/km^{2}
San Roque	34,617	29,956	+15.6%	139.48	248.2/km^{2}
Setenil de las Bodegas	2,636	2,928	−10.0%	82.15	32.1/km^{2}
Tarifa	18,657	17,732	+5.2%	419.18	44.5/km^{2}
Torre Alháquime	800	826	−3.1%	17.36	46.1/km^{2}
Trebujena	7,051	7,093	−0.6%	70.72	99.7/km^{2}
Ubrique	16,441	16,875	−2.6%	69.75	235.7/km^{2}
Vejer de la Frontera	13,041	12,825	+1.7%	264.58	49.3/km^{2}
Villaluenga del Rosario	467	470	−0.6%	59.46	7.9/km^{2}
Villamartín	12,249	12,480	−1.9%	211.42	57.9/km^{2}
Zahara	1,360	1,499	−9.3%	72.51	18.8/km^{2}
Province of Cádiz	1,258,730	1,244,732	+1.1%	7,439.76	169.2/km^{2}
Andalusia	8,631,862	8,371,270	+3.1%	87,587.59	98.6/km^{2}
Spain	48,619,695	46,815,916	+3.9%	504,755.17	96.3/km^{2}

== See also ==
- Geography of Spain
- List of municipalities of Spain
