= Benalup-Casas Viejas =

- Municipality
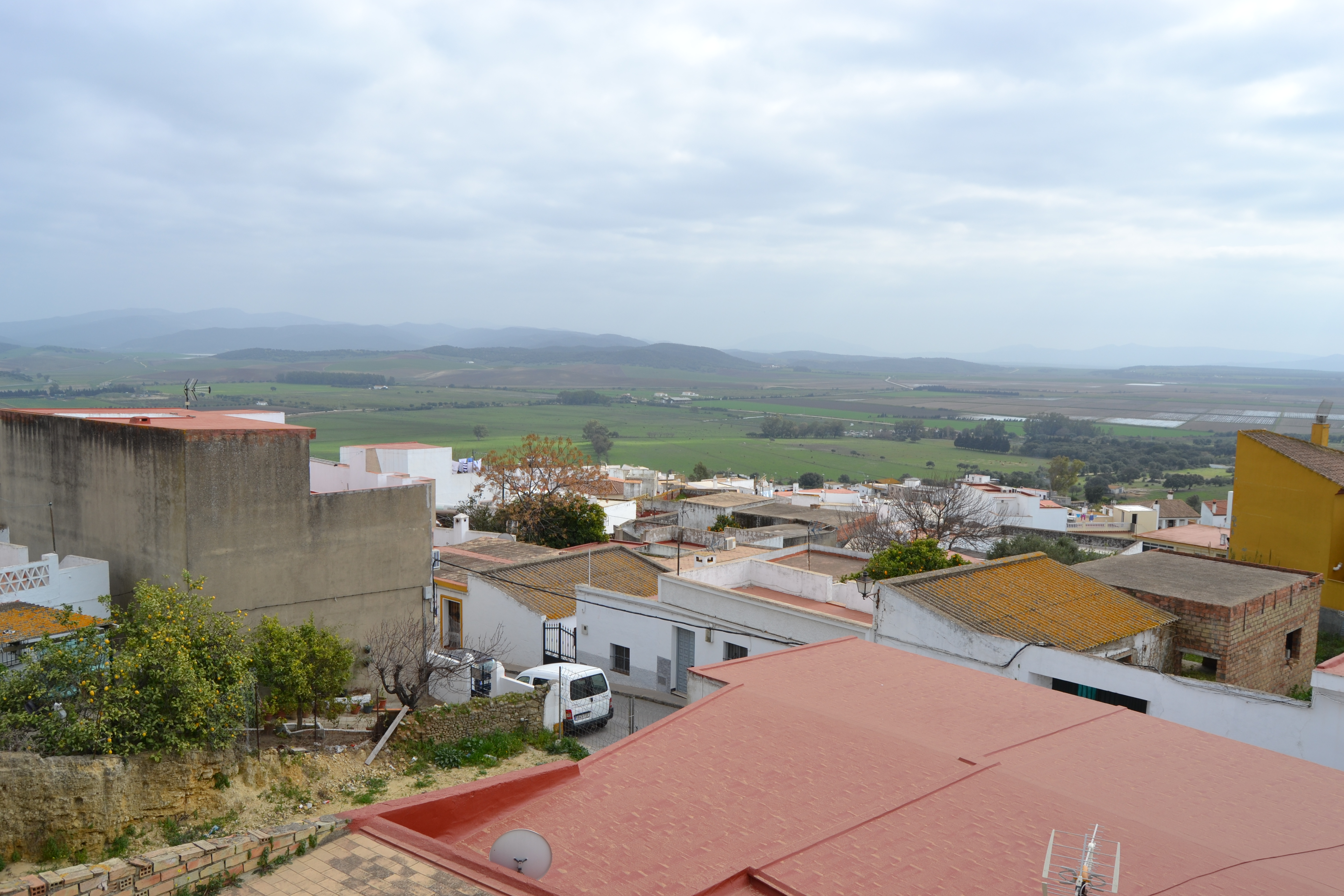

- Flag Coat of arms

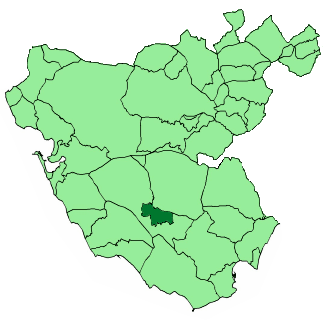

- Location in Spain
- Coordinates: 36°20′N 5°48′W
- Country: Spain
- Autonomous community: Andalusia
- Province: Cádiz
- Comarca: La Janda

Government
  - Mayor: Francisco González Cabaña (PSOE)

Area
  - Total: 60.70 km^{2} (23.44 sq mi)
- Elevation: 112 m (367 ft)

Population (2025-01-01)
  - Total: 7,236
  - Density: 119.2/km^{2} (308.8/sq mi)
- Demonym: Benalupenses
- Time zone: UTC+1 (CET)
  - Summer (DST): UTC+2 (CEST)
- Website: benalupcasasviejas.es

Casas Viejas is a city located in the province of Cádiz, Spain. According to the 2005 census, the city has a population of 6,754 inhabitants.

== Main sights ==
- Cueva del Tajo de las Figuras
- Iglesia de Nuestra Señora del Socorro

== Economy ==
Agriculture and rural tourism prevails. Casas Viejas is located on the Route of the Bull tourist trail.

== Benalup-Casas Viejas revolution ==
The anarchist movement which spread across Spain in the late 19th and early 20th centuries was based on the ideas of Mikhail Bakunin and propagated by Giuseppi Fanelli. It urged oppressed workers to unite and organize against their oppressors, namely the State, the latifundista landowners, and the Church. It quickly took a hold amongst the long-exploited agricultural workers in Andalusia, who joined the CNT union or the more radical FAI and had some limited success in improving wages and working conditions.

The establishment's attempts to stamp out such revolutionary zeal came to a tragic head in 1933 at Casas Viejas, now Benalup-Casas Viejas, in the province of Cádiz. A small group of militants trying to resist arrest after a failed uprising barricaded themselves in a cottage, which was burned down with the anarchists and their families still inside. Soldiers and police then arrested anyone in the village who possessed a gun, marched them to the smoking ashes of the cottage and their dead colleagues, and shot them in the back. The massacre led to national outrage and there was considerable debate about whether the orders to kill had or had not been issued by the President of the Second Spanish Republic, Niceto Alcalá-Zamora. This was never proven, but it is believed to have contributed to his defeat in the following general election.

== See also ==
- List of municipalities in Cádiz
