= Conil de la Frontera =

- Municipality
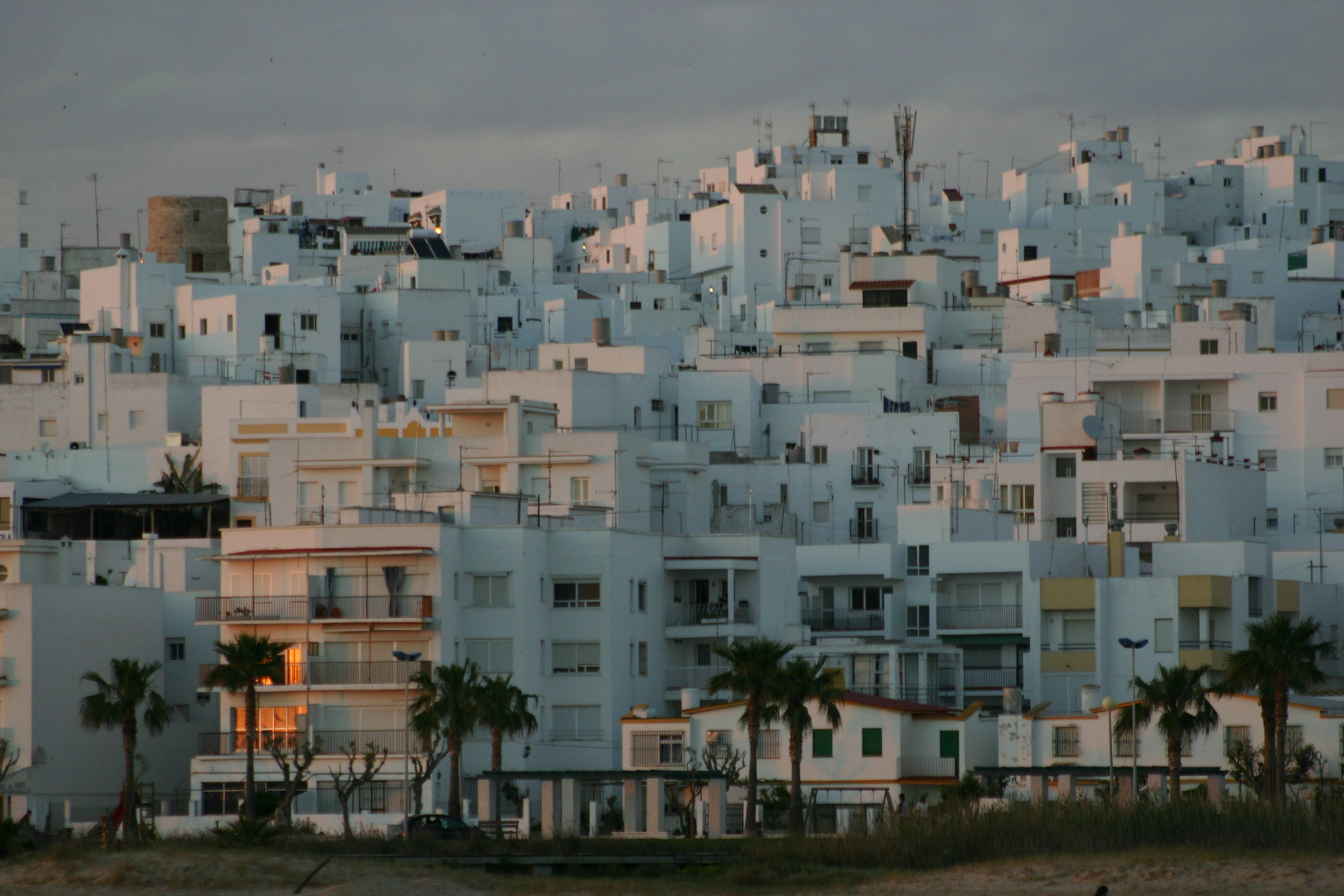

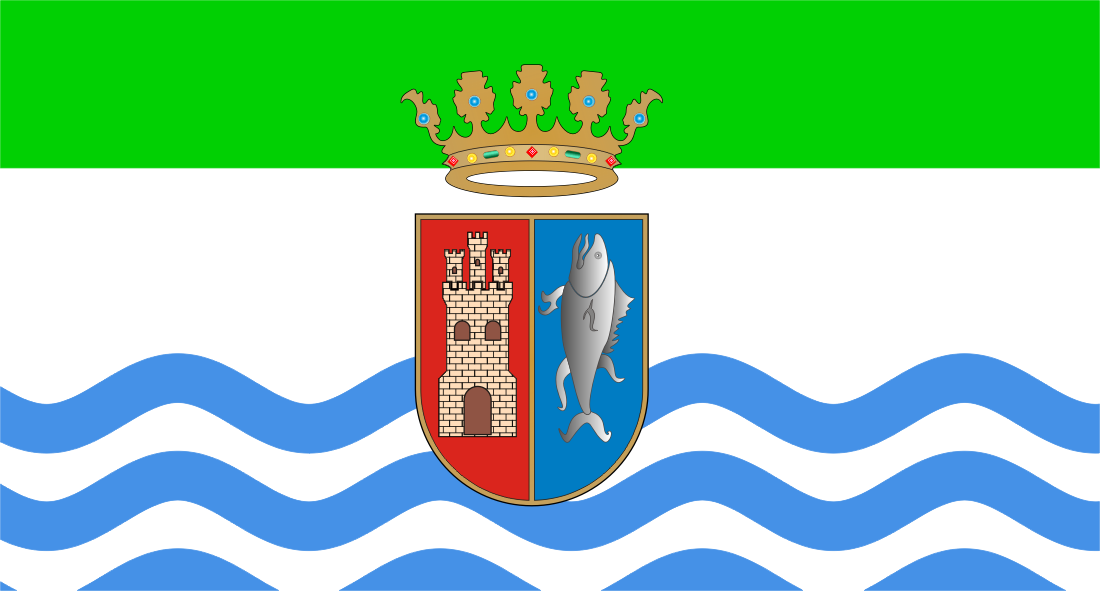
- Flag Coat of arms

- Location in the Province of Cádiz Location in Andalusia Location in Spain
- Coordinates: 36°16′N 6°5′W
- Country: Spain
- Autonomous community: Andalusia
- Province: Cádiz
- Comarca: La Janda

Government
  - Mayor: Juan Manuel Bermúdez Escámez (Izquierda Unida)

Area
  - Total: 88.51 km^{2} (34.17 sq mi)
- Elevation: 41 m (135 ft)

Population (2025-01-01)
  - Total: 24,102
  - Density: 272.3/km^{2} (705.3/sq mi)
- Demonym: Conileños
- Time zone: UTC+1 (CET)
  - Summer (DST): UTC+2 (CEST)
- Postal code: 11140
- Website: Official website

Conil de la Frontera is one of the White Towns of Andalusia in the province of Cádiz (region of Andalusia), located on the Atlantic coast in the southern part of Spain, with around 22,000 inhabitants.

== Gallery ==
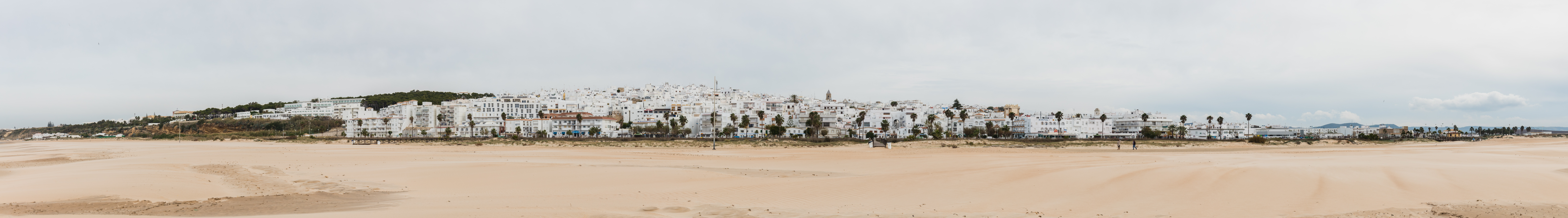
Conil de la Frontera

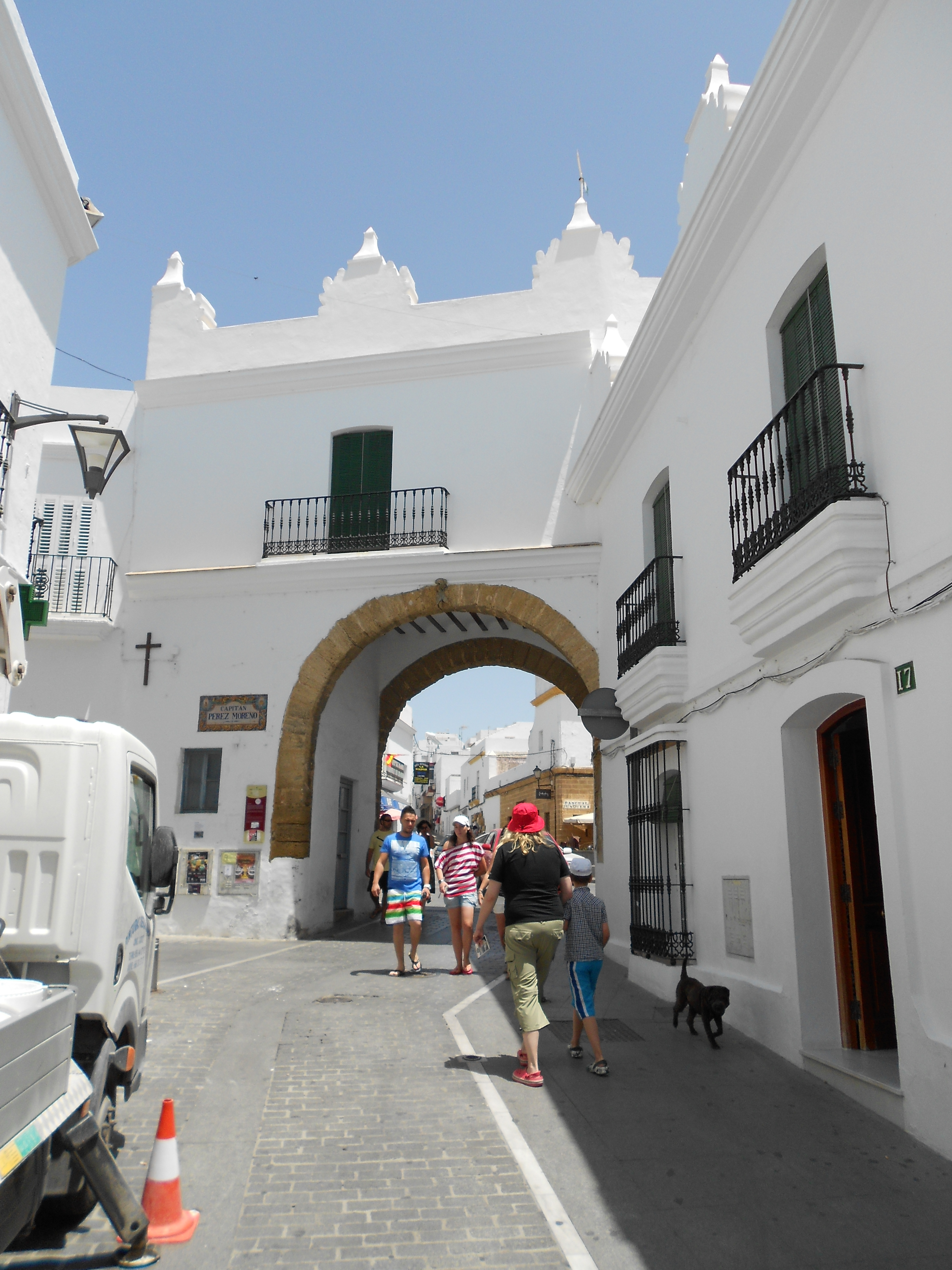
The Gate to the Old Town

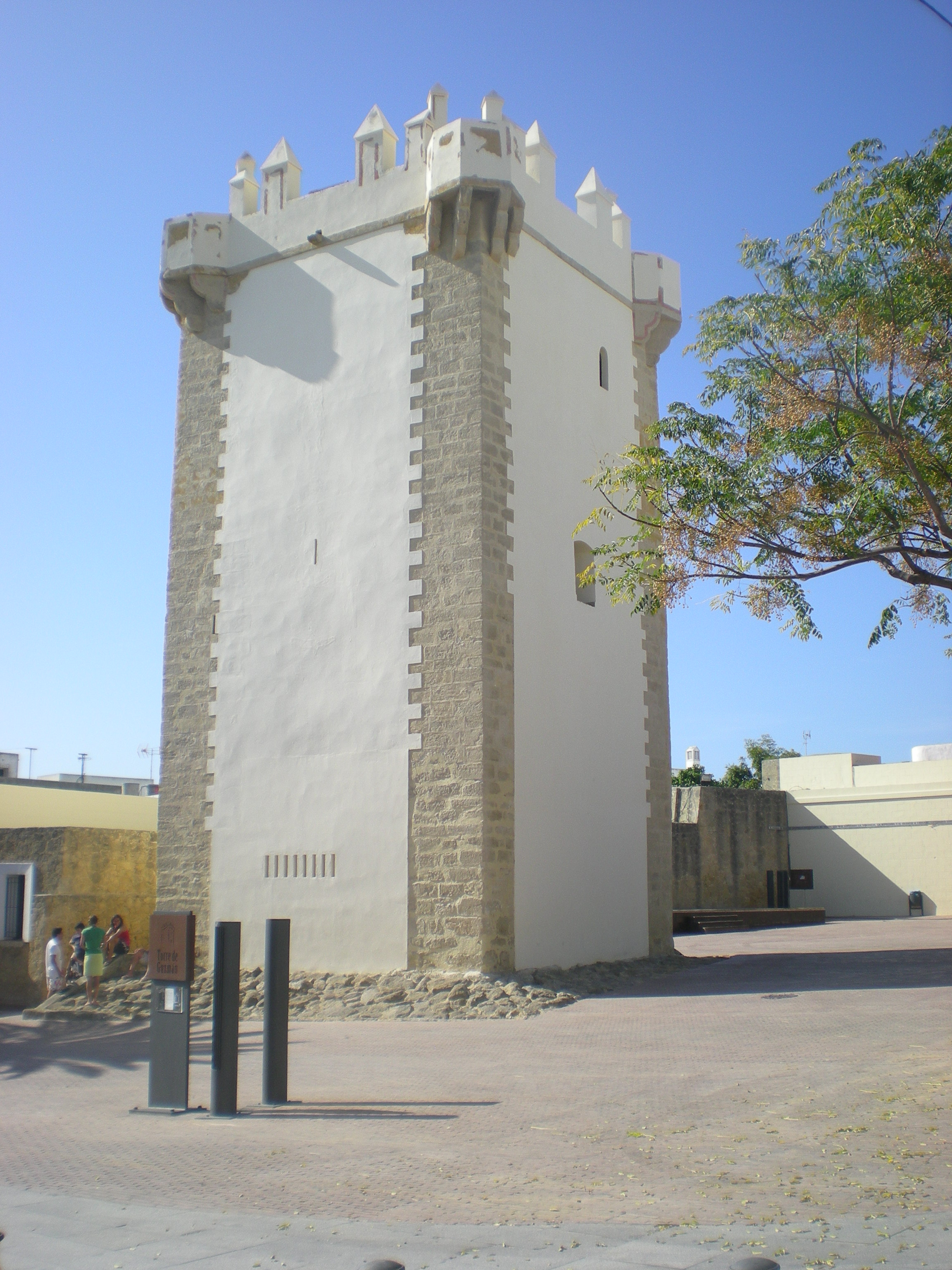
Tower of Guzmán

== See also ==
- List of municipalities in Cádiz
