= Paterna de Rivera =

Paterna de Rivera, Spain
- Flag Coat of arms

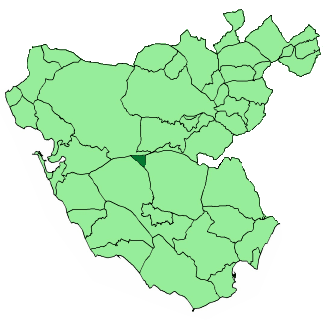
- Location of Paterna de Rivera
- Coordinates: 36°31′N 5°52′W
- Municipality: Cádiz

Government
  - Mayor: José María Barrera García

Area
  - Total: 14 km^{2} (5.4 sq mi)
  - Land: 14 km^{2} (5.4 sq mi)
  - Water: 0.00 km^{2} (0 sq mi)

Population (2025-01-01)
  - Total: 5,539
  - Density: 400/km^{2} (1,000/sq mi)
- Time zone: UTC+1 (CET)
  - Summer (DST): UTC+2 (CEST)
- Website: paternaderivera.es

Paterna de Rivera is a small town located in the province of Cádiz, Spain. According to the 2005 census, it had a population of 5,354.

== Demographics ==
Historical population
Year	Pop.	±%
1999	5,180	—
2000	5,179	−0.0%
2001	5,198	+0.4%
2002	5,246	+0.9%
2003	5,325	+1.5%
2004	5,313	−0.2%
2005	5,354	+0.8%
Source: INE (Spain)

== See also ==
- List of municipalities in Cádiz
