= Vejer de la Frontera =

- Town and municipality
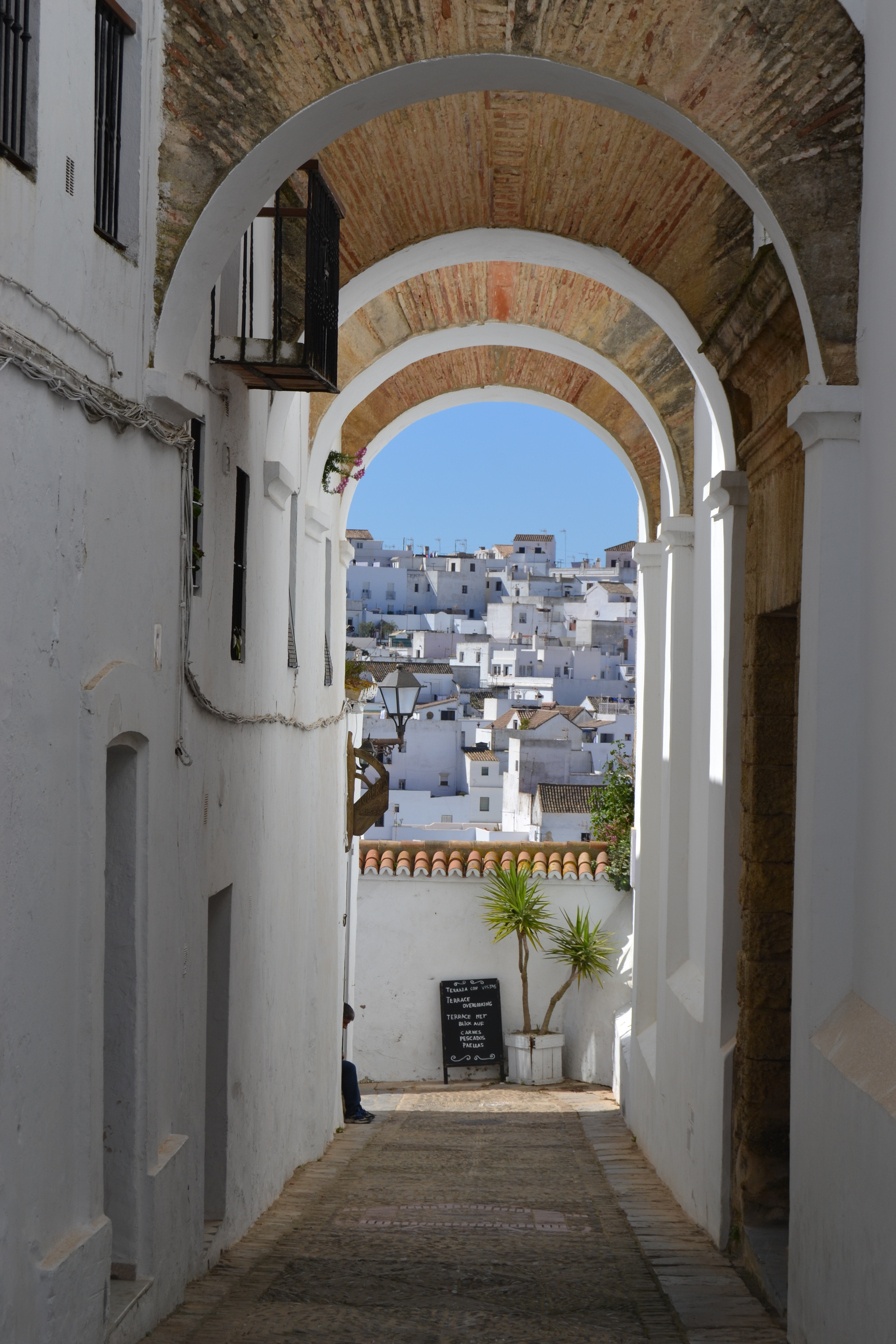
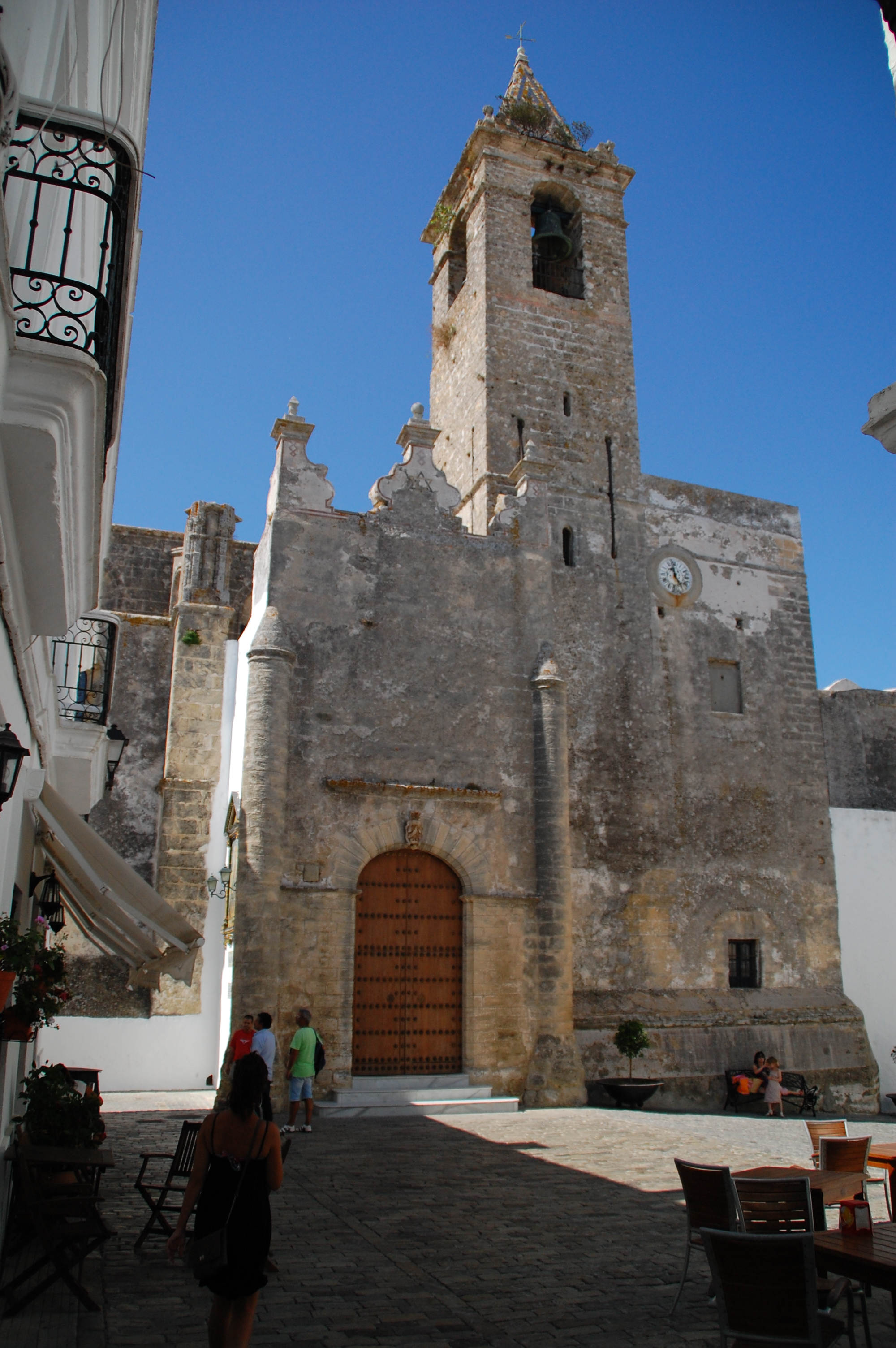
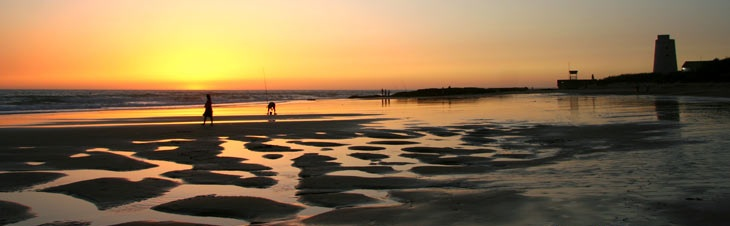
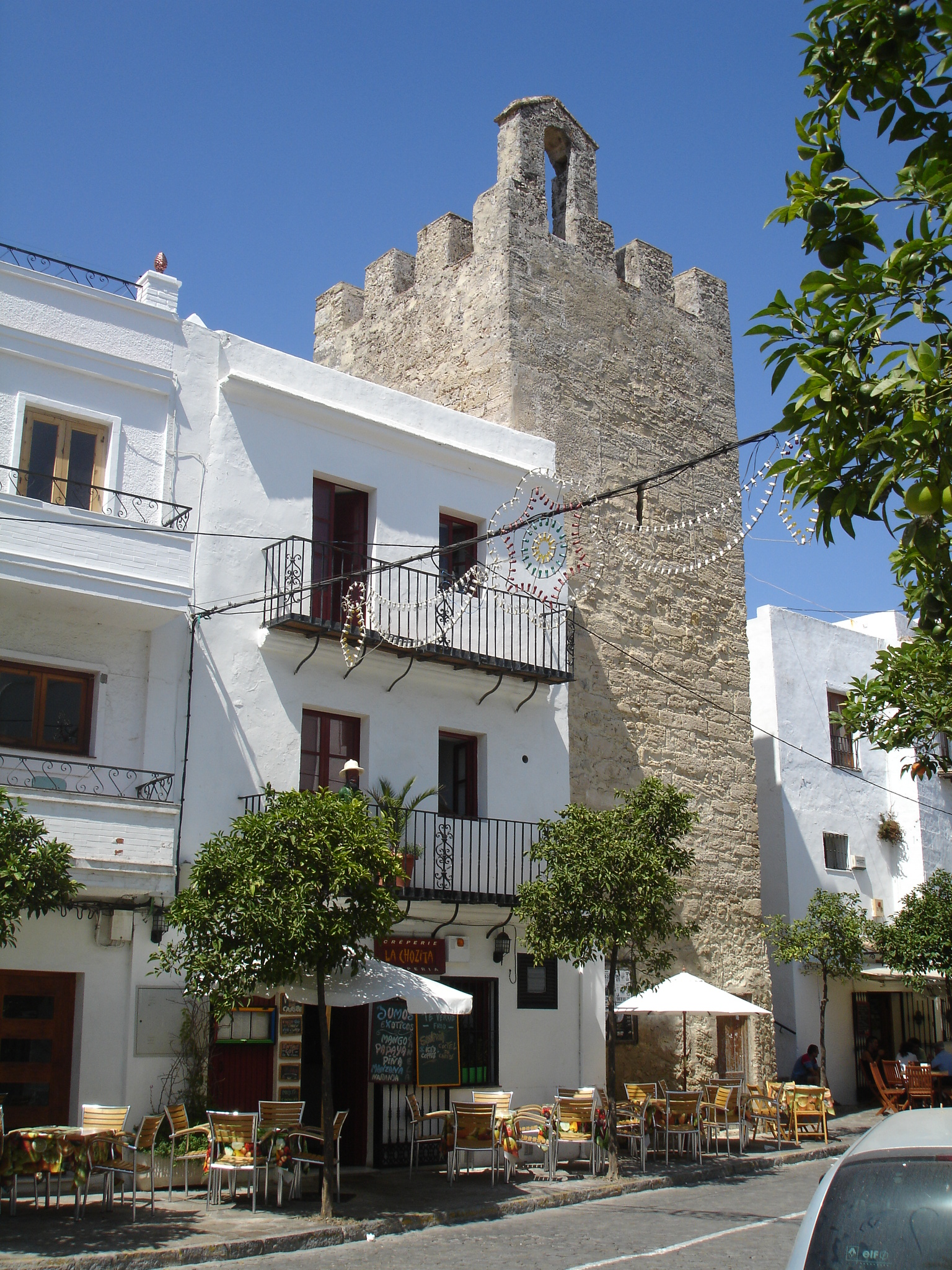
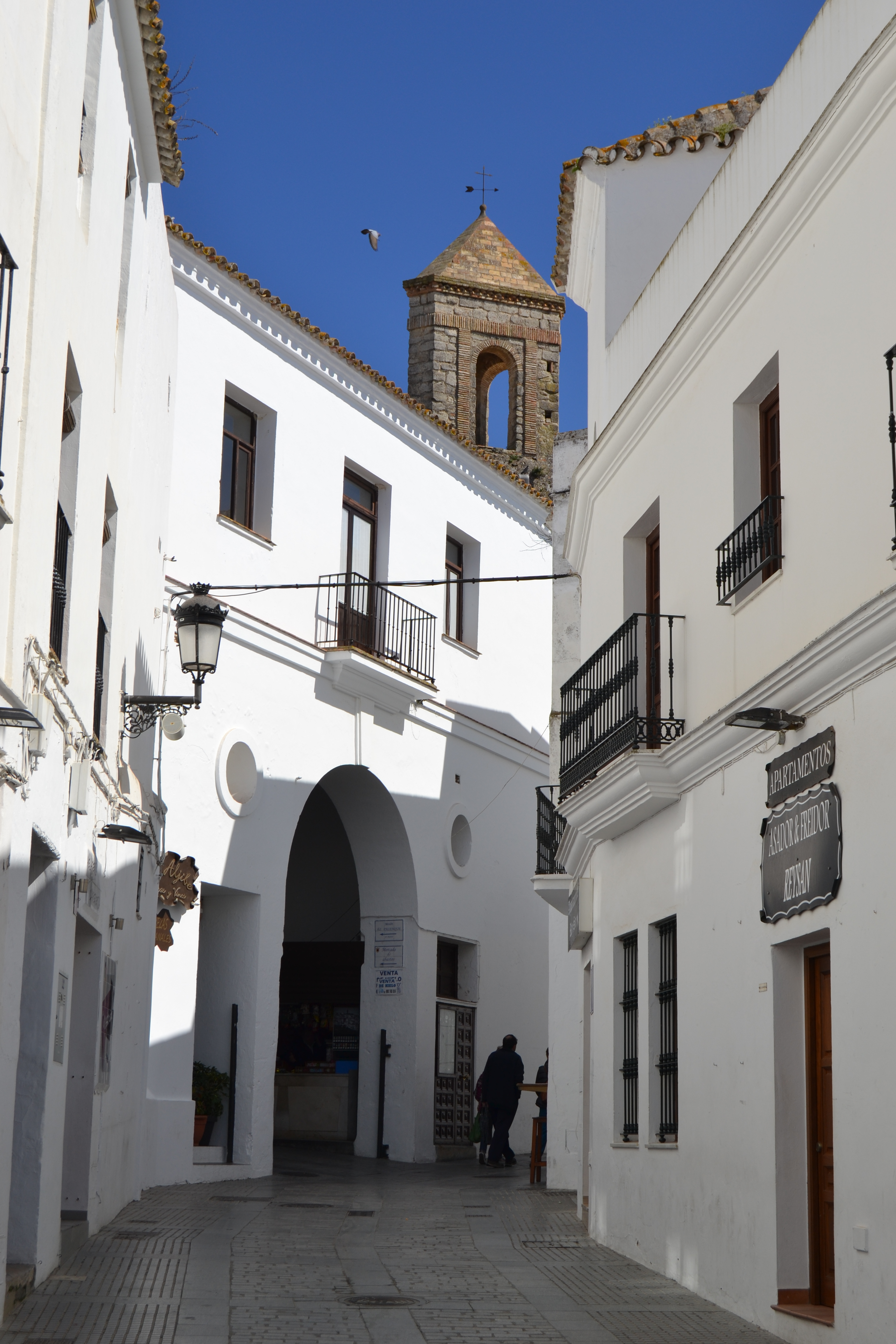

- Flag Coat of arms
- Nickname: The Olives' Town
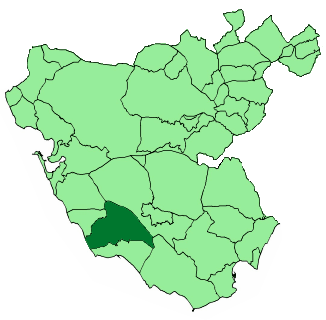
- Location of Vejer de la Frontera
- Coordinates: 36°15′N 5°58′W
- Municipality: Cádiz

Government
  - Mayor: José Ortíz Galván

Area
  - Total: 58 km^{2} (22 sq mi)
  - Land: 58 km^{2} (22 sq mi)
  - Water: 0 km^{2} (0 sq mi)

Population (2025-01-01)
  - Total: 13,131
  - Density: 230/km^{2} (590/sq mi)
- Demonym: Vejeriegos/ Vejeriegas
- Time zone: UTC+1 (CET)
  - Summer (DST): UTC+2 (CEST)
- Postal code: 11150
- Official language(s): Spanish
- Website: www.vejerdelafrontera.es

Spanish Cultural Heritage
- Type: Non-movable
- Criteria: Historic ensemble
- Designated: 7 June 1976
- Reference no.: RI-53-0000206

Vejer de la Frontera is a Spanish hilltop town and municipality in the province of Cádiz, Andalusia, on the right bank of the river Barbate. The town of Vejer de la Frontera occupies a low hill overlooking the Straits of Gibraltar and surrounded by orchards and orange groves. It contains several ancient churches and convents, and the architecture of many of its houses recalls the period of Moorish rule, which lasted from 711 until the town was captured by Saint Ferdinand of Castile in 1248. Agriculture and fruit-farming are the chief industries; fighting bulls are also bred in the neighborhood and a running of the bulls is held annually.

== Demographics ==
Historical population
Year	Pop.	±%
1999	12,731	—
2000	12,674	−0.4%
2001	12,729	+0.4%
2002	12,727	−0.0%
2003	12,690	−0.3%
2004	12,685	−0.0%
2005	12,776	+0.7%
Source: INE (Spain)

== Festivities ==
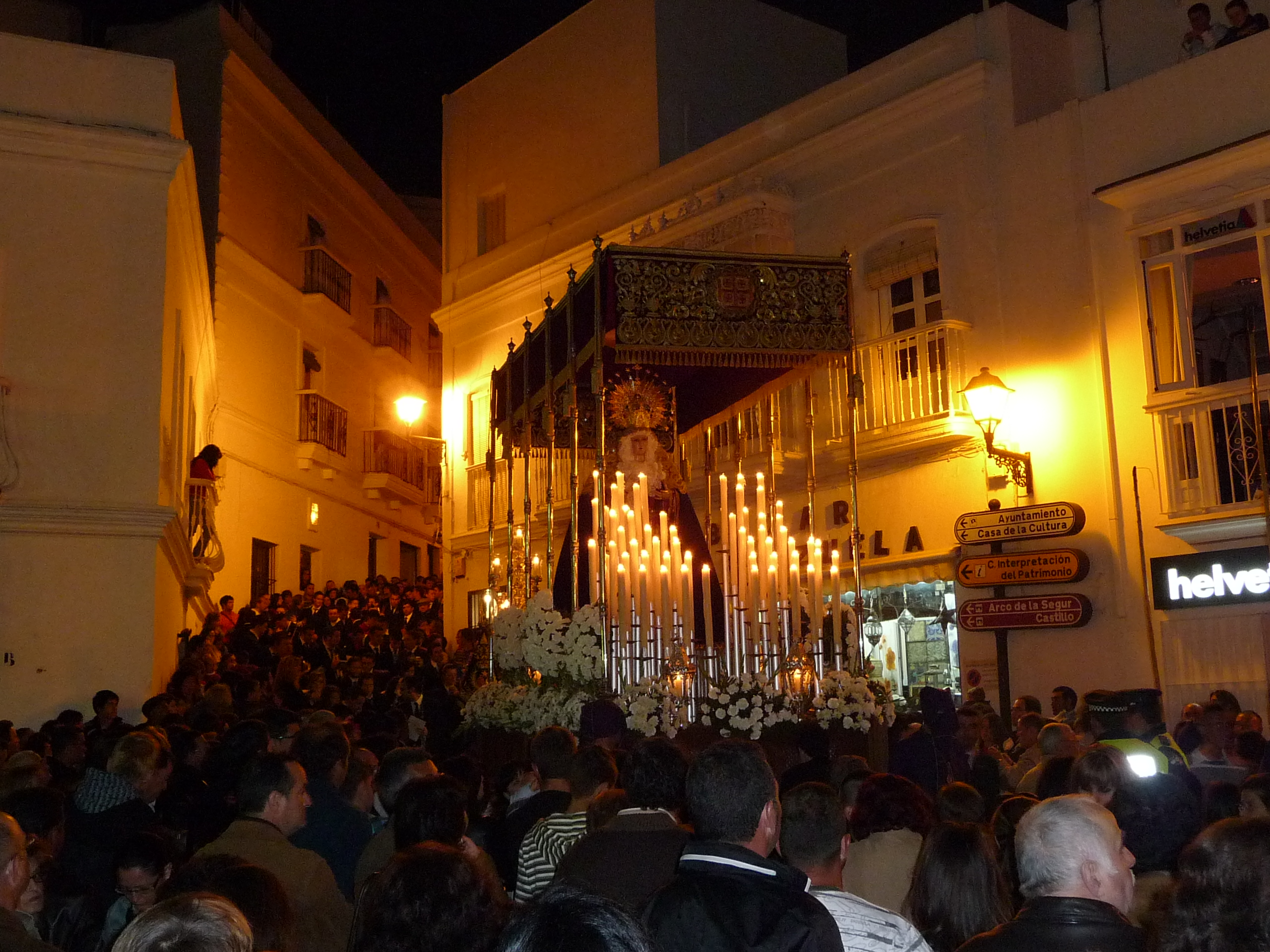
Holy Week

Holy Week: Holy Week is observed in the alleys of Vejer. There are three brotherhoods: the Brotherhood of the Cristo de la Oliva, which holds its procession on Holy Wednesday; the Brotherhood of Nuestro Padre Jesús Nazareno, which holds its procession on Holy Thursday; and the Brotherhood of the Soledad, which holds its procession on Good Friday. The latter two are accompanied by saetas.

Spring Carnival: Main festivity of the town with various casetas and attractions.

Verbena de San Juan: The strawmen Juanillos and Juanillos are burned, taking the shape of important personalities during the year. The festivity also includes the fire bull.

Velada de Nuestra Señora de la Oliva: Romeria where the patron saint of the town is taken to her sanctuary.

== Sister cities ==
- Ostuni, Italy
- Chefchaouen, Morocco
- Amboise, France

== Gallery ==
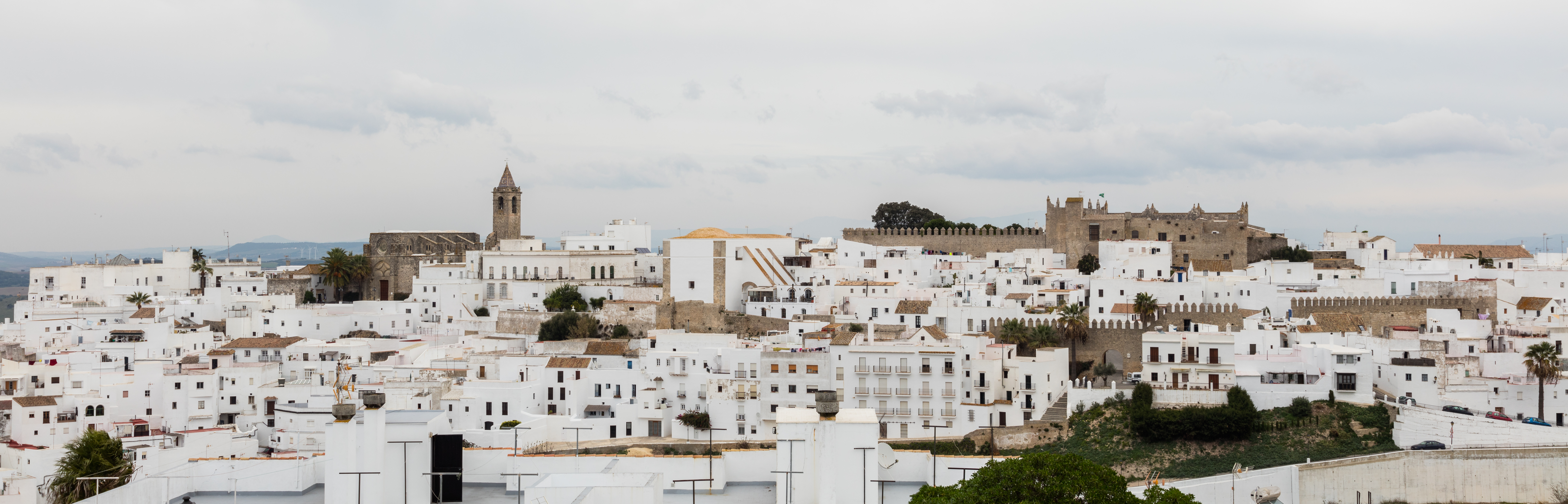
General view.

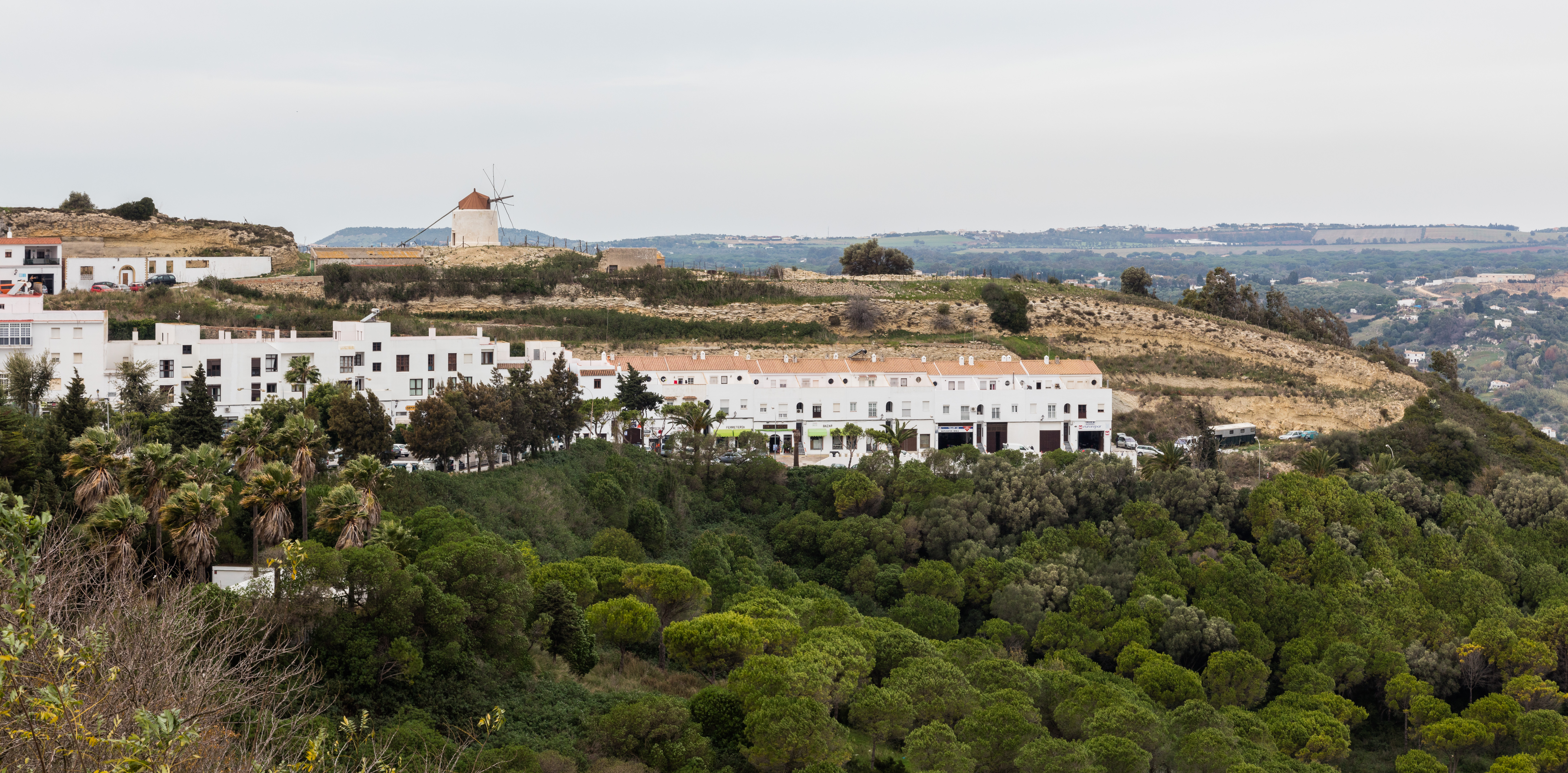
View of the mill.

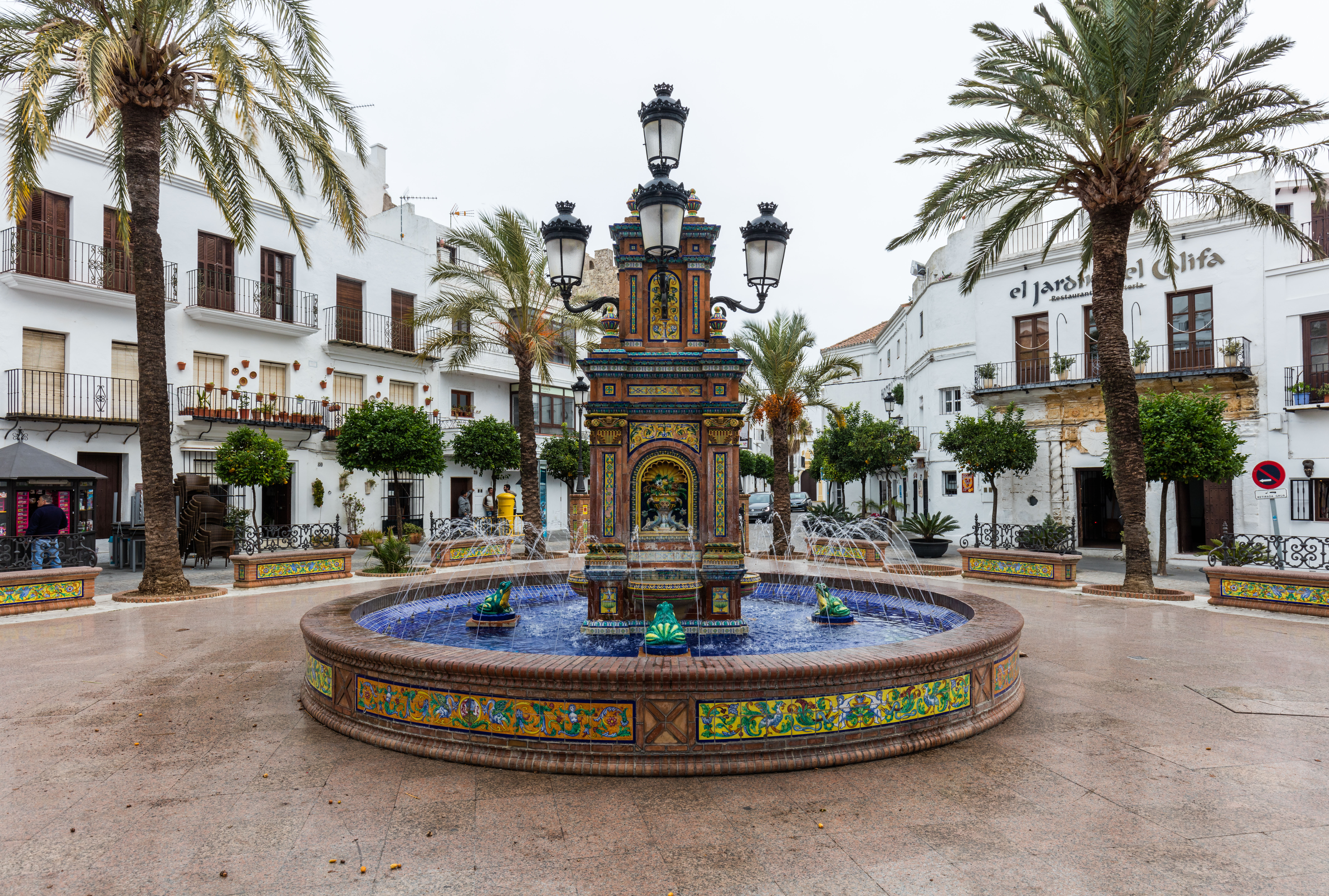
Main square.

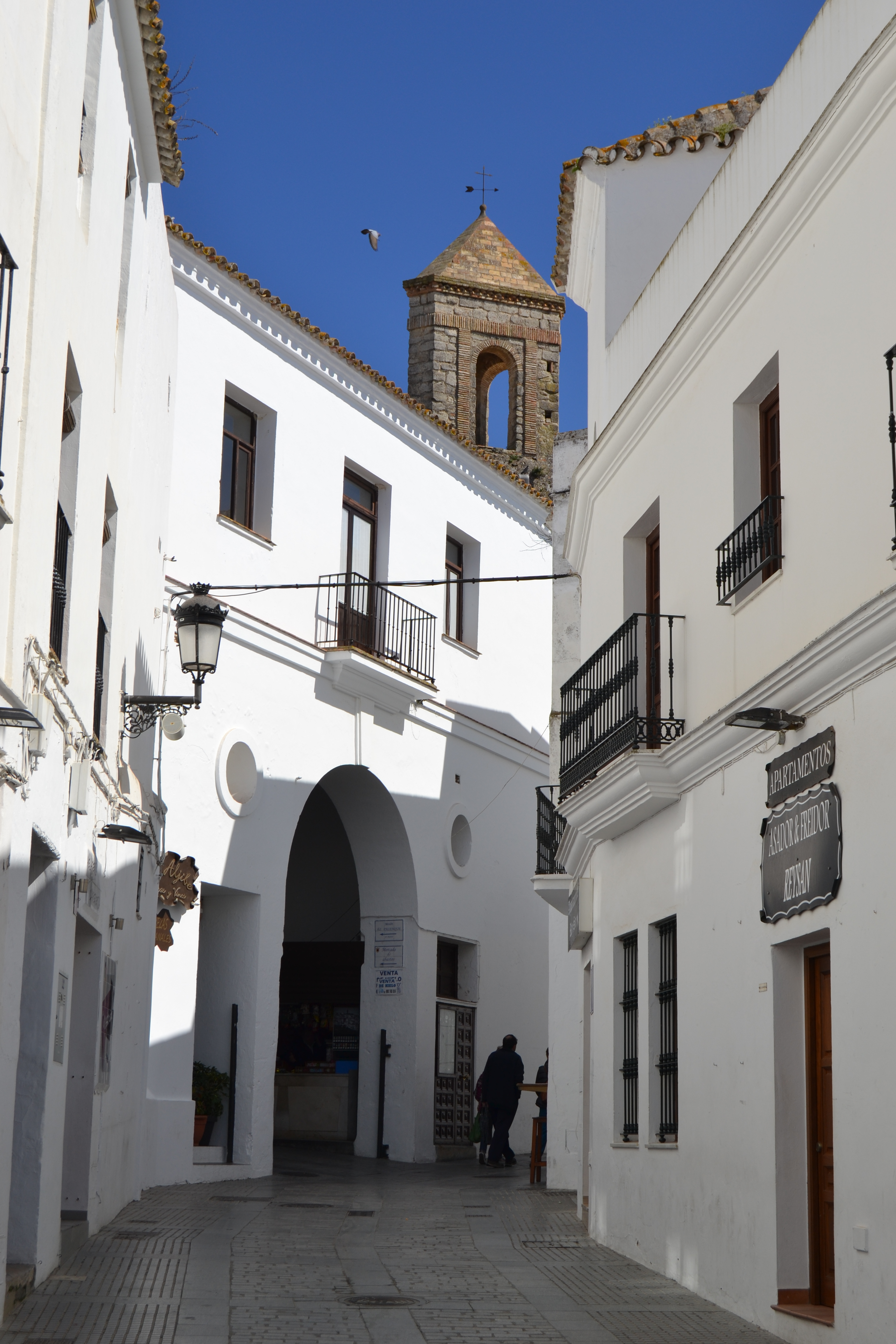
Street in Vejer.

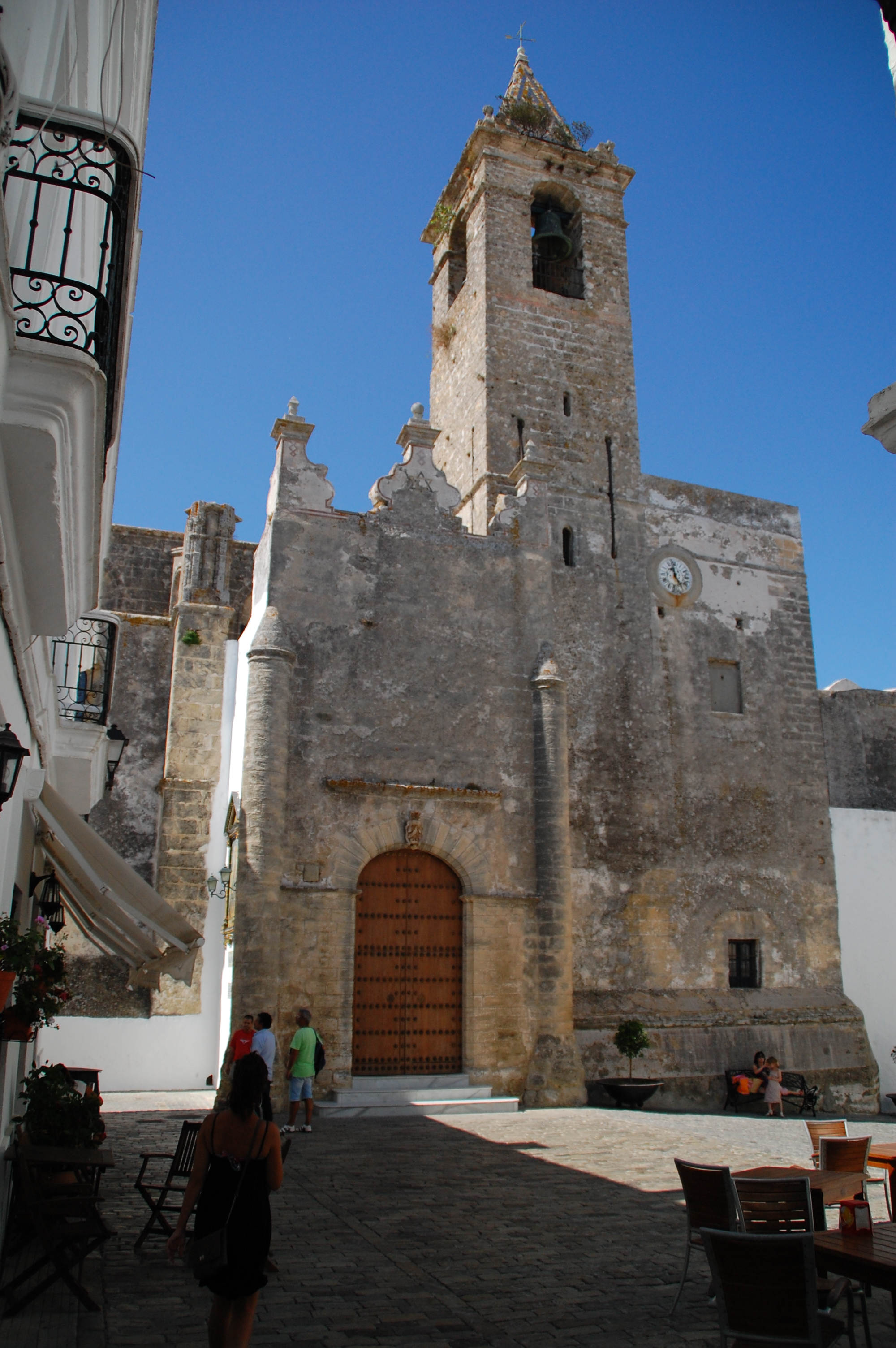
Church of Divino Salvador.

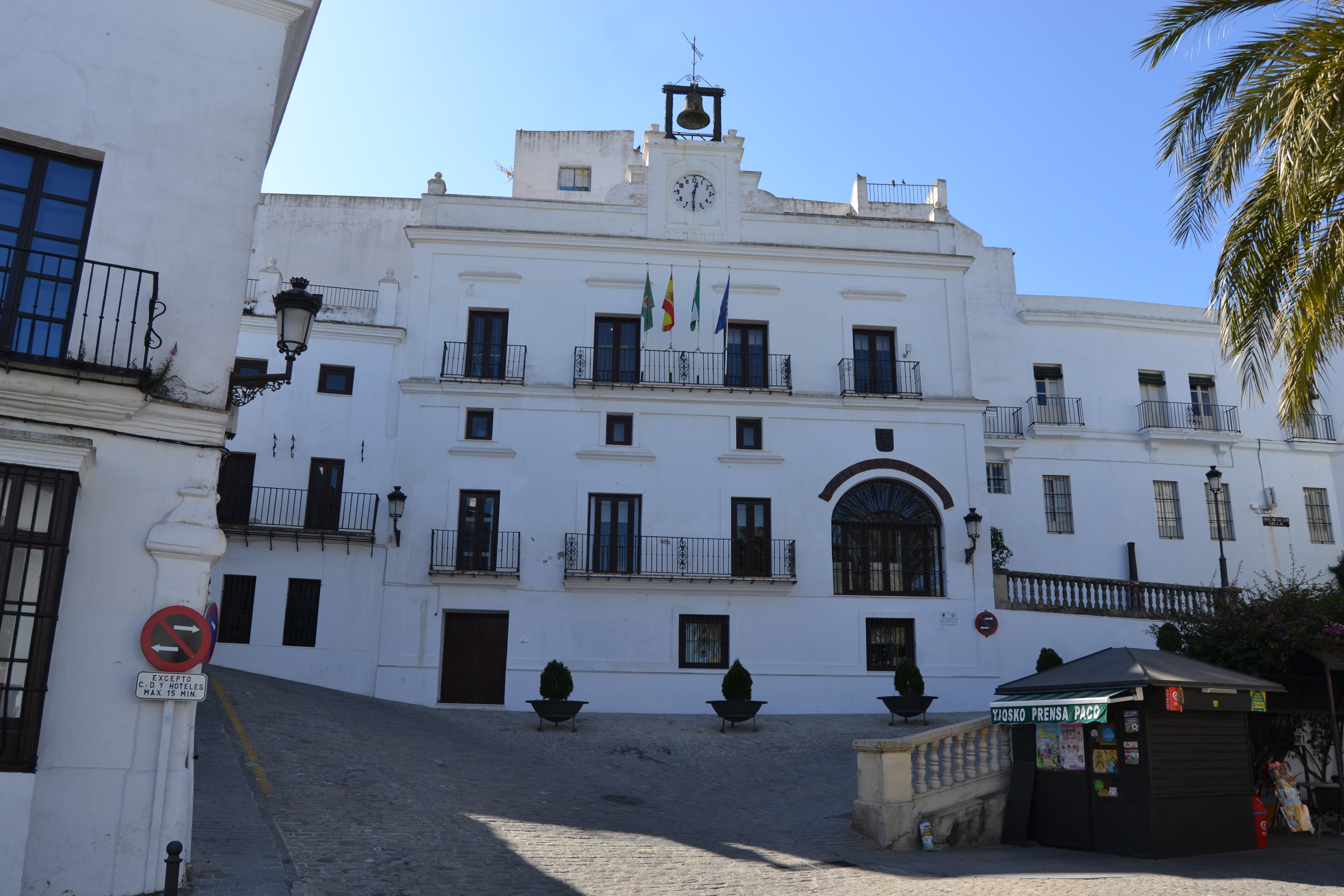
Town Hall.

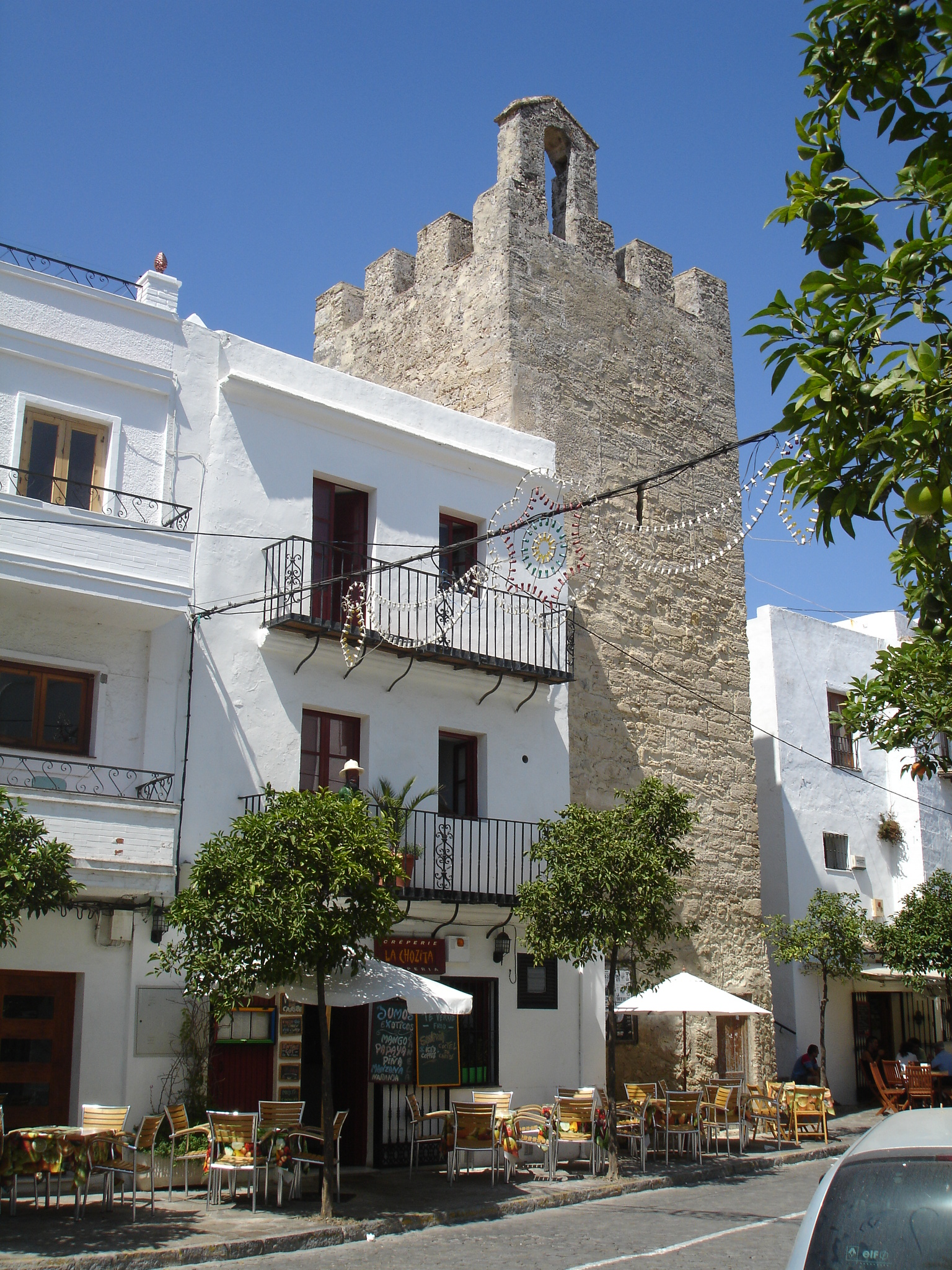
Mayorazgo Tower.

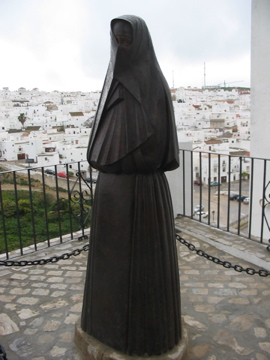
Statue of a veiled woman in Vejer

== See also ==
- List of municipalities in Cádiz
