= Caño de Sancti Petri =

Shallow channel in Cádiz, Andalusia, Spain

Coordinates: 36°24′N 6°12′W

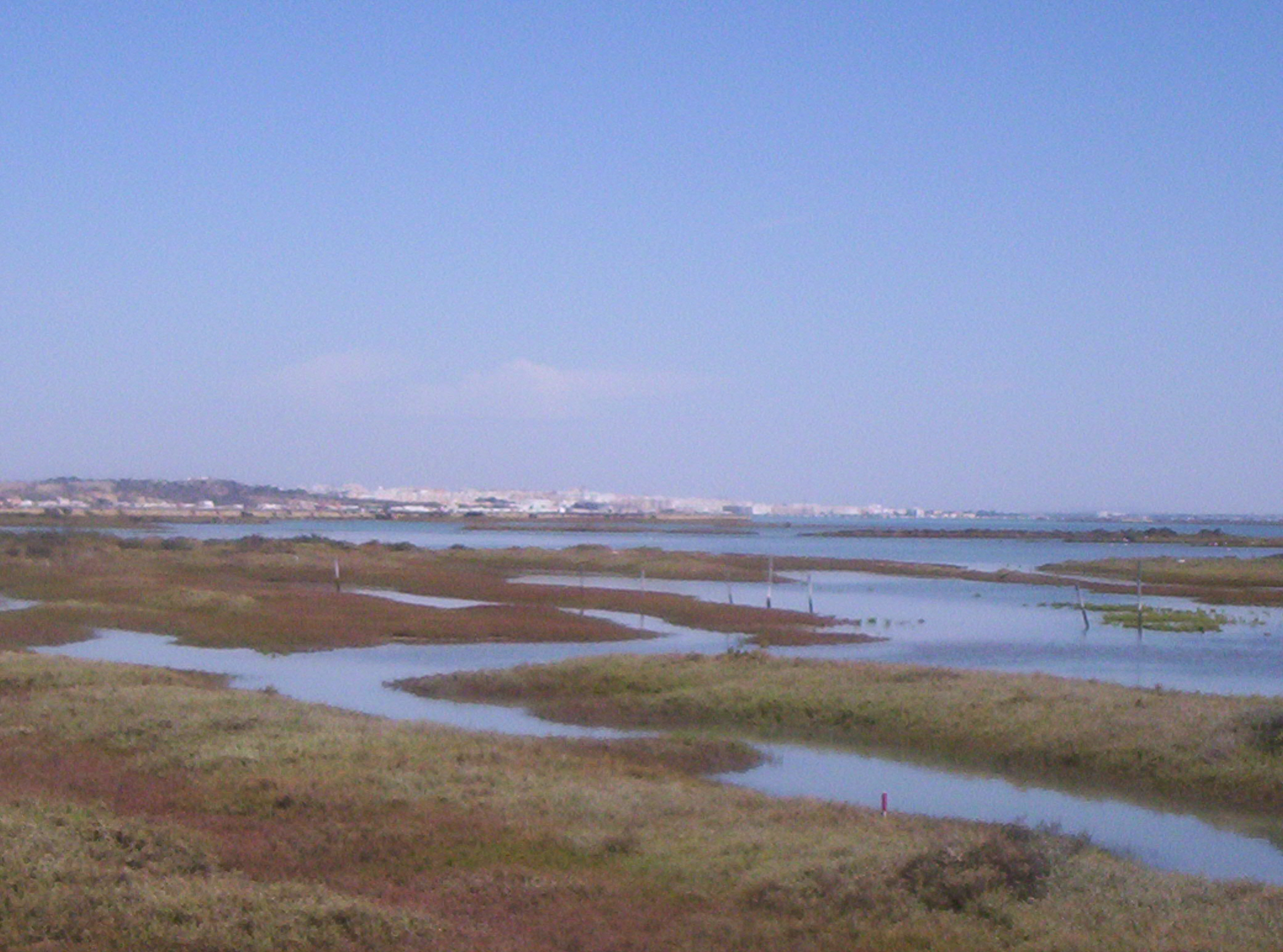
Caño de Sancti Petri, with the town of San Fernando in the distance

Caño de Sancti Petri is a shallow channel in the province of Cádiz, Andalusia, southwestern Spain. Narrow and winding, it is situated between Isla de León and the mainland, and is part of the Bahía de Cádiz Natural Park.
