= Province of Cádiz =

Province of Spain

Province of Cádiz Provincia de Cádiz
- Province
- Flag Coat of arms

- Map of the Province of Cádiz in Spain
- Coordinates: 36°30′N 5°45′W
- Country: Spain
- Autonomous community: Andalusia
- Capital: Cádiz
- Municipalities: 45 (list)

Government
  - Type: Diputación
  - Body: Provincial Deputation of Cádiz
  - President: Almudena Martínez del Junco (PP)

Area
  - Total: 7,444.00 km^{2} (2,874.14 sq mi)
  - Rank: 34th in Spain
- 1.5% of Spain
- Highest elevation (El Torreón): 1,654 m (5,427 ft)

Population (2025)
  - Total: 1,261,420
  - Rank: 8th in Spain
  - Density: 169.455/km^{2} (438.885/sq mi)
- 2.6% of Spain
- Demonym: Gaditano/a
- ISO 3166 code: ES-CA
- Website: www.dipucadiz.es

The Province of Cádiz (Spanish: Provincia de Cádiz) is a province of southern Spain, in the southwestern part of the autonomous community of Andalusia. It is the southernmost part of mainland Spain, as well as the southernmost part of continental Europe. Its capital is the city of Cádiz, though the largest city is Jerez de la Frontera.

It is bordered by the Spanish provinces of Huelva, Seville, and Málaga, as well as the Atlantic Ocean, the Mediterranean Sea, the Strait of Gibraltar and the British overseas territory of Gibraltar.

It has a population of 1,261,420 in an area of 7,444.00 square kilometres (2,874.14 sq mi) across its 45 municipalities.

== Administrative subdivisions ==
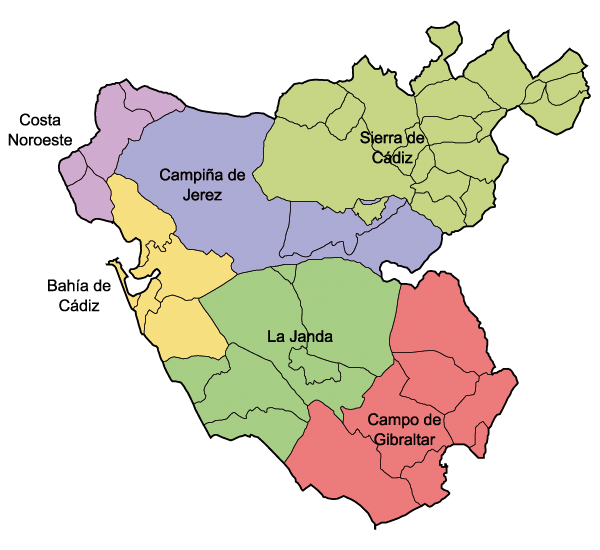
Map of the distinct areas that comprise the Province of Cádiz

The province encompasses 44 municipalities; besides its capital, other important cities are Jerez and Algeciras. (See the list of municipalities in Cádiz.) According to a roster developed by the Council of Tourism and Sport of Andalusia on 27 March 2003, there are officially six traditional or touristic comarcas (provincial areas or counties) in the Province of Cádiz:

- Bahía de Cádiz (Bay of Cádiz)
- Campiña de Jerez (Countryside of Jerez)
- Campo de Gibraltar (Countryside of Gibraltar)
- Bajo Guadalquivir (Lower Guadalquivir, or Northwest Coast, Costa Noroeste)
- La Janda
- Sierra de Cádiz (Cádiz Mountains)

=== Bay of Cádiz (Bahía de Cádiz) ===
This area comprises towns and cities on the shores of the Bay of Cádiz on the west-central coast of the province:

- Cádiz
- Chiclana
- El Puerto de Santa María
- Puerto Real
- San Fernando
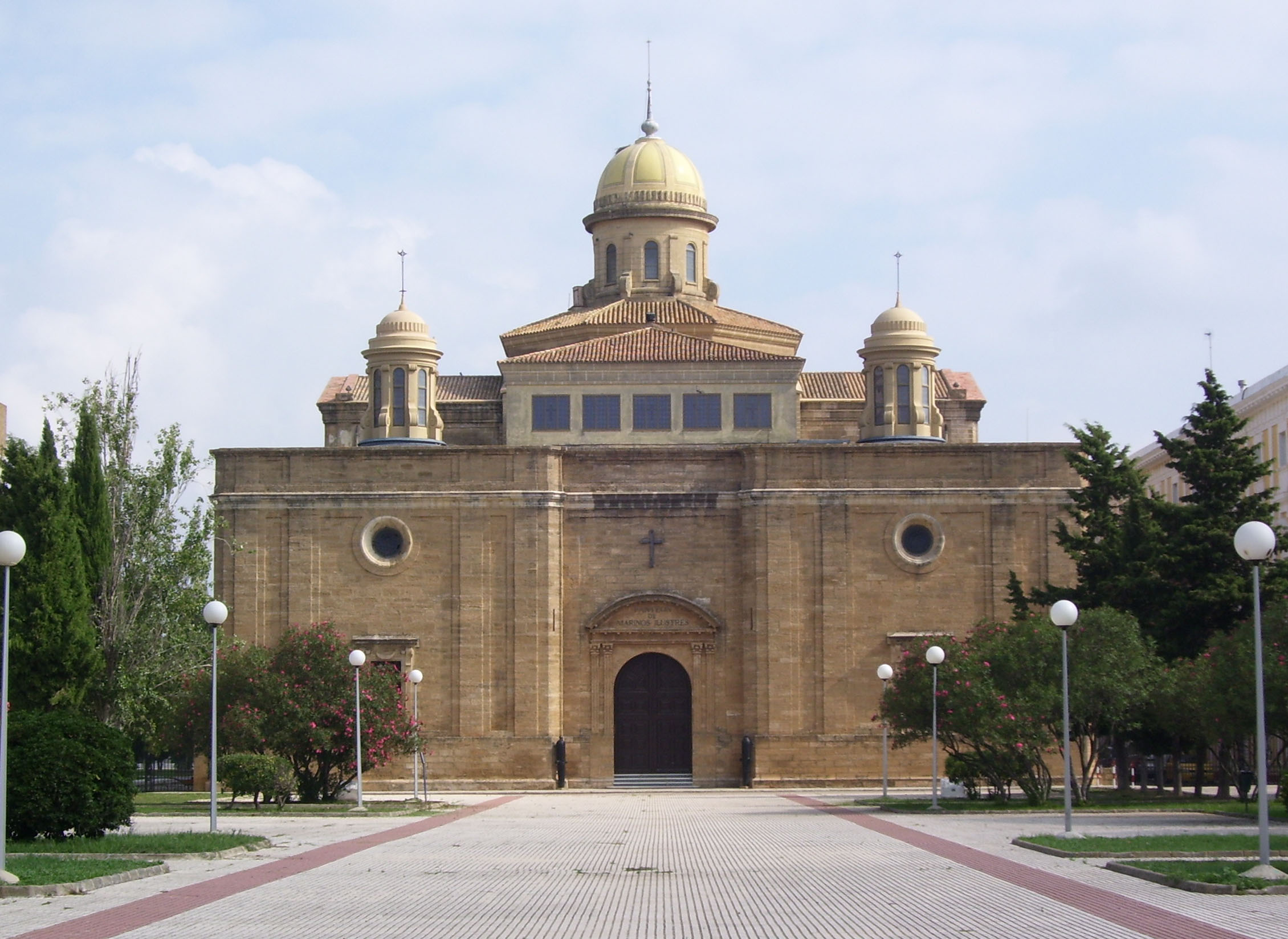
Panteón de Marinos Ilustres

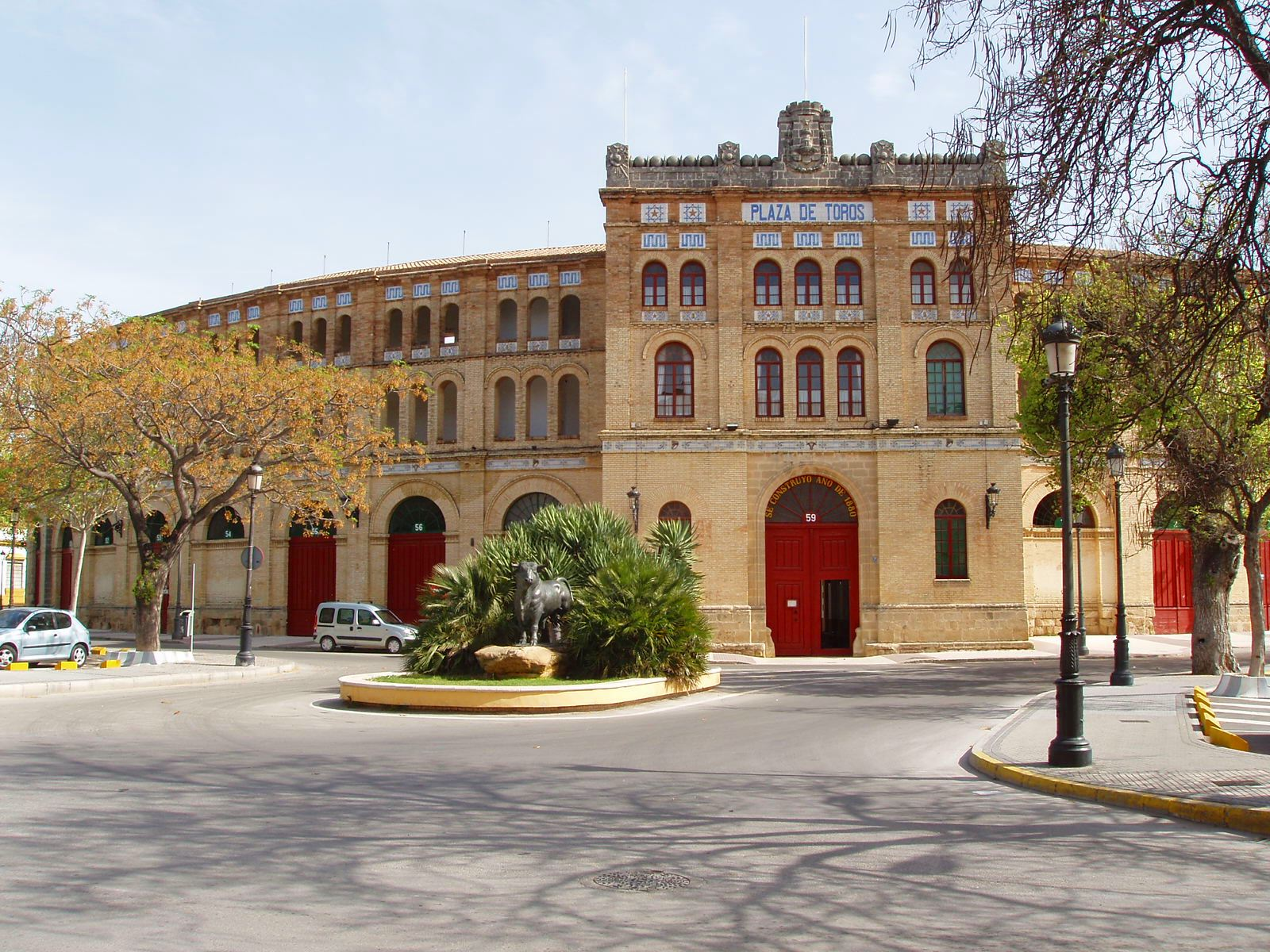
The bullring at El Puerto

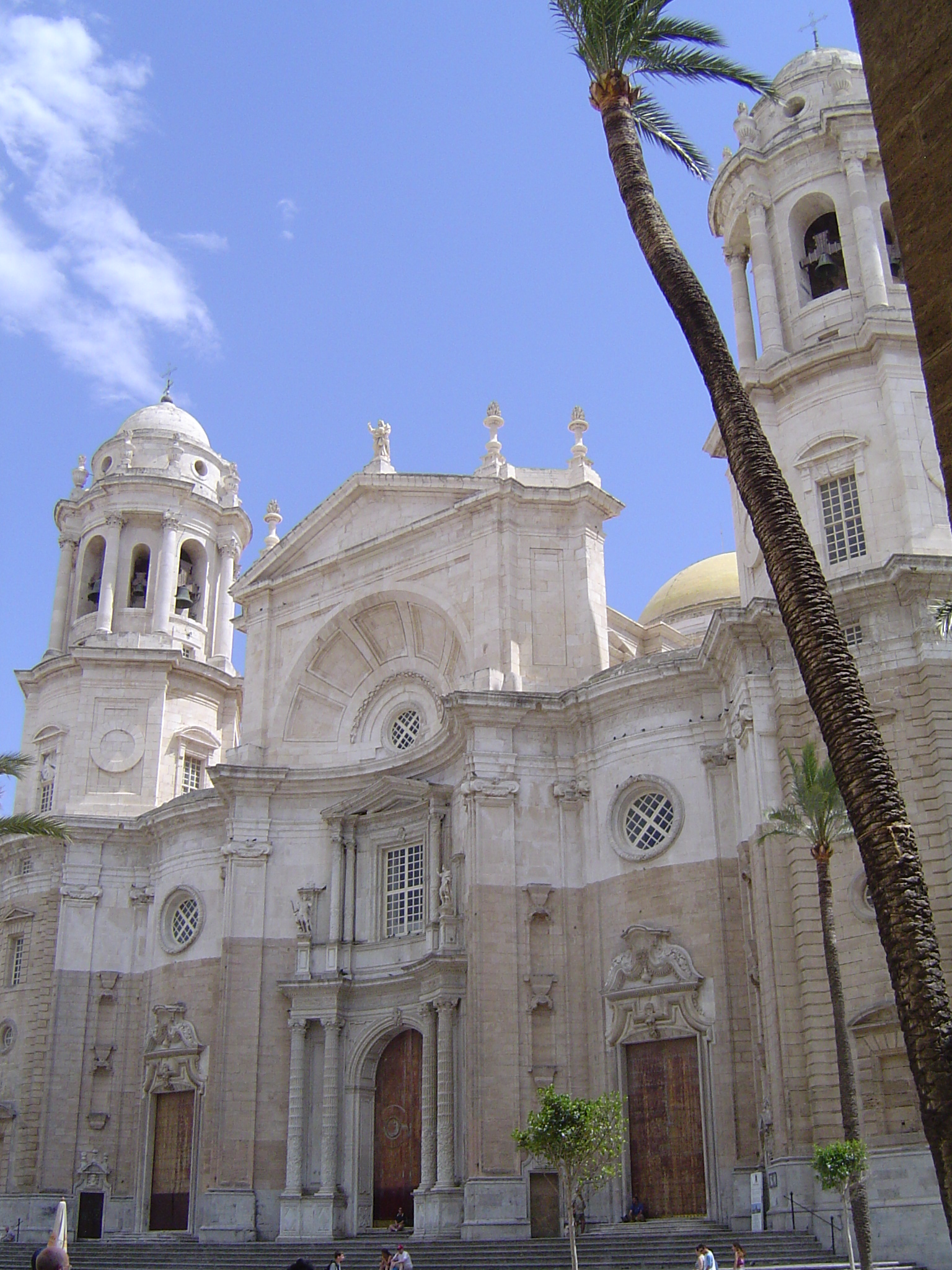
The cathedral at Cádiz

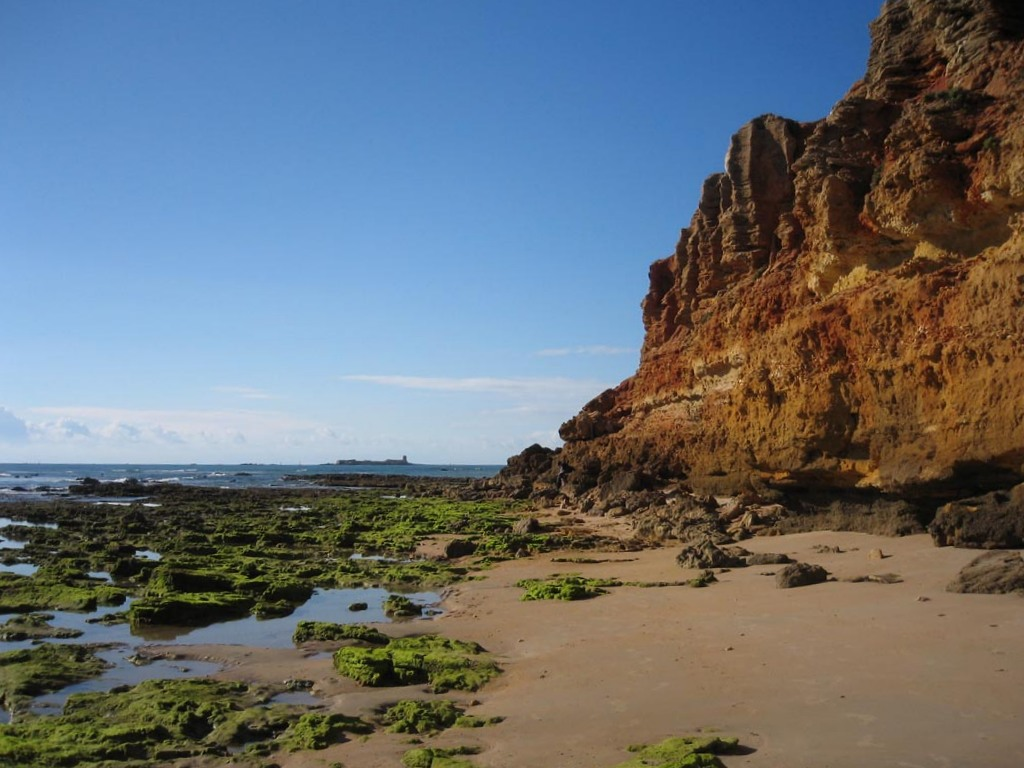
Sancti Petri beach

=== Campiña de Jerez (Countryside of Jerez) ===
This fertile area only includes two municipalities, both large in area:

- Jerez de la Frontera
- San José del Valle
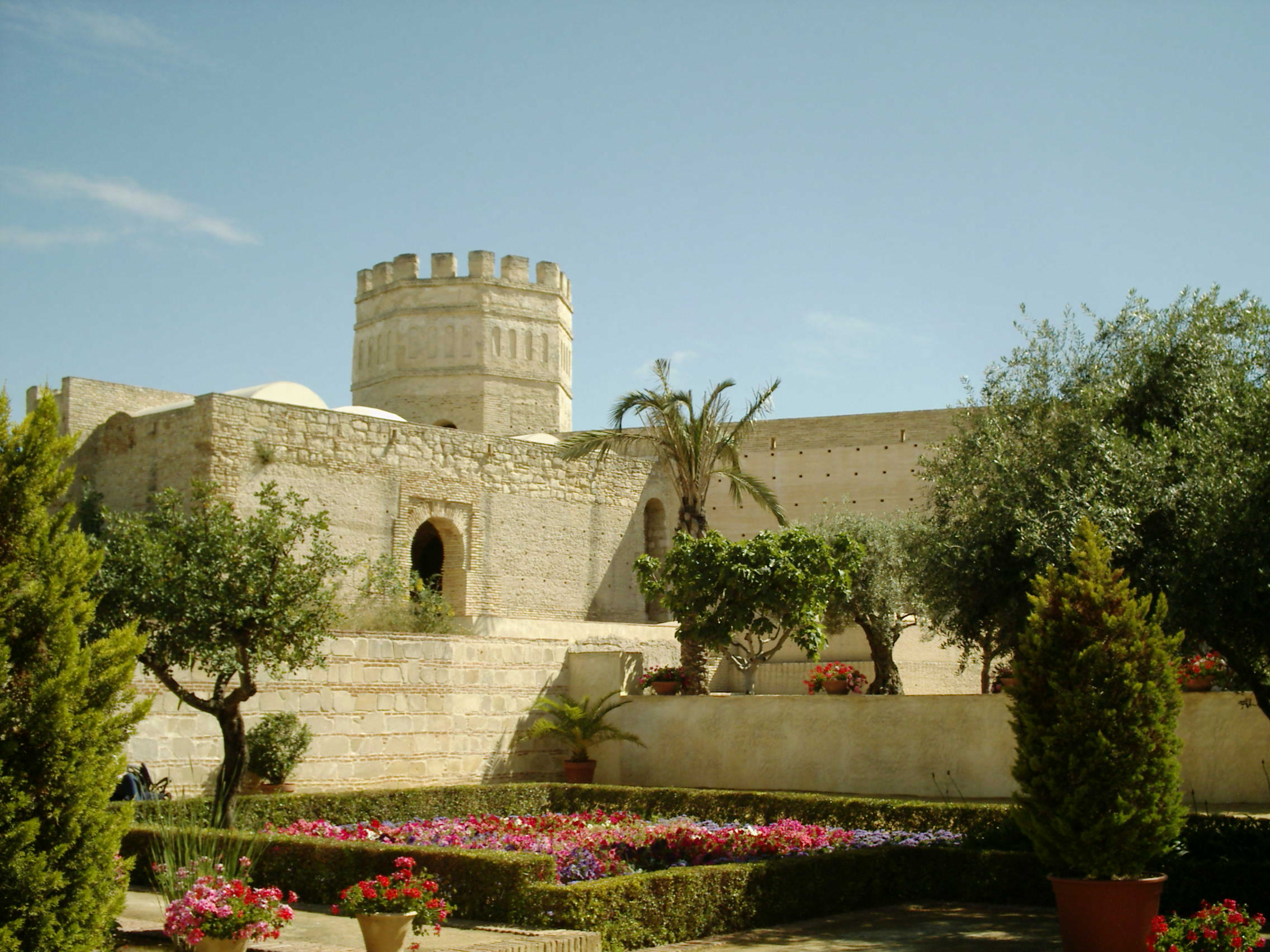
Octagonal tower in the Alcázar of Jerez de la Frontera

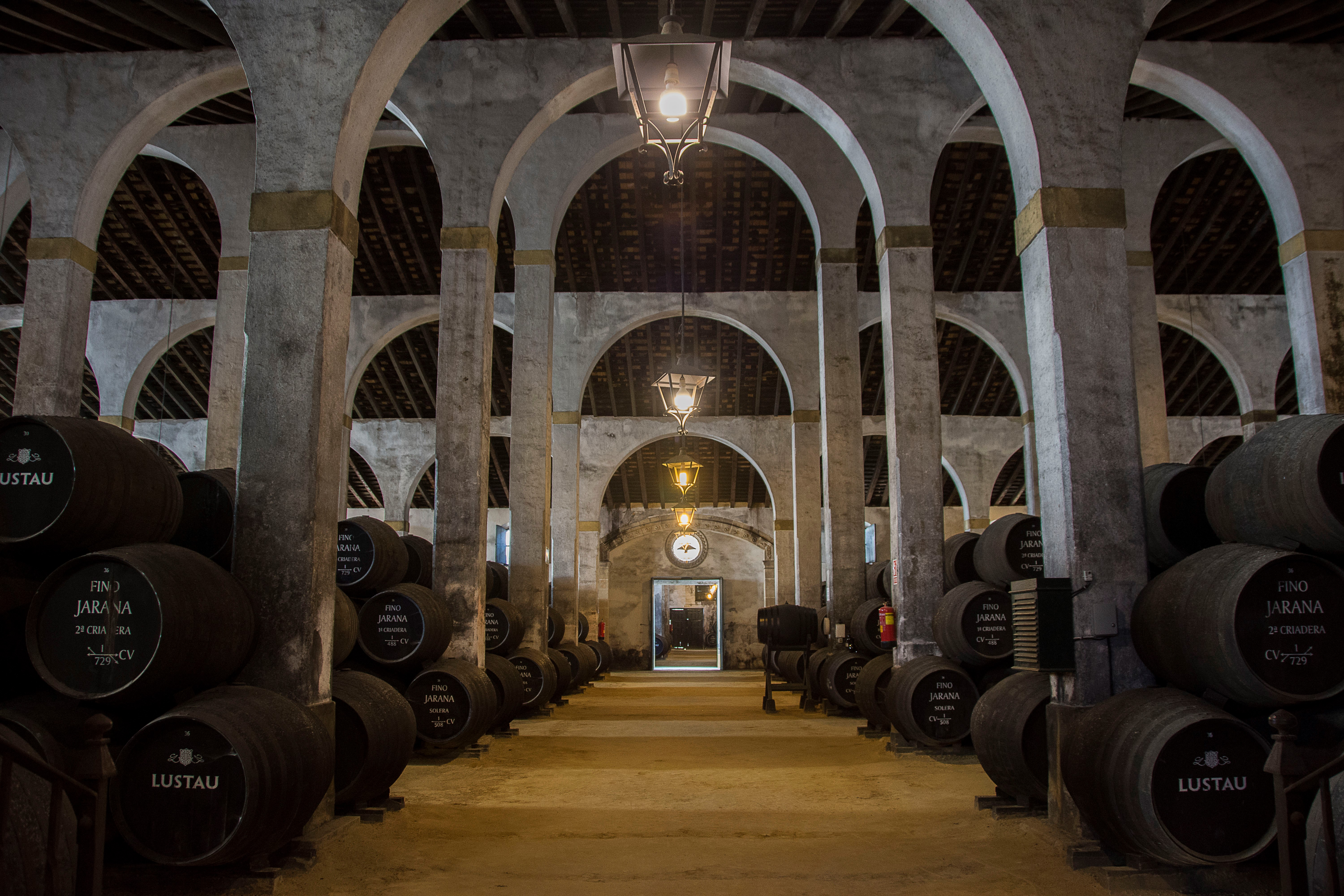
A sherry solera

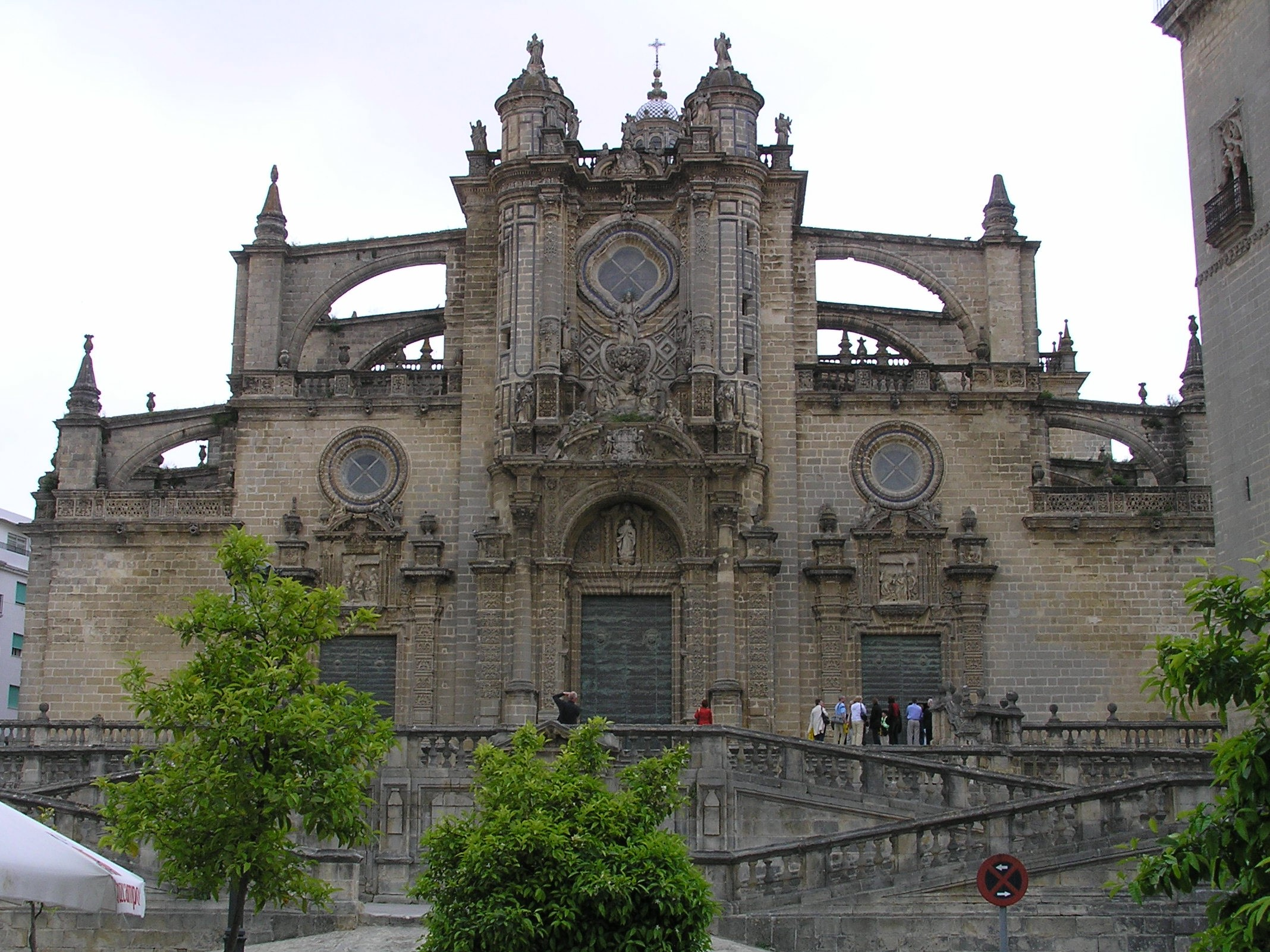
Cathedral of Jerez de la Frontera

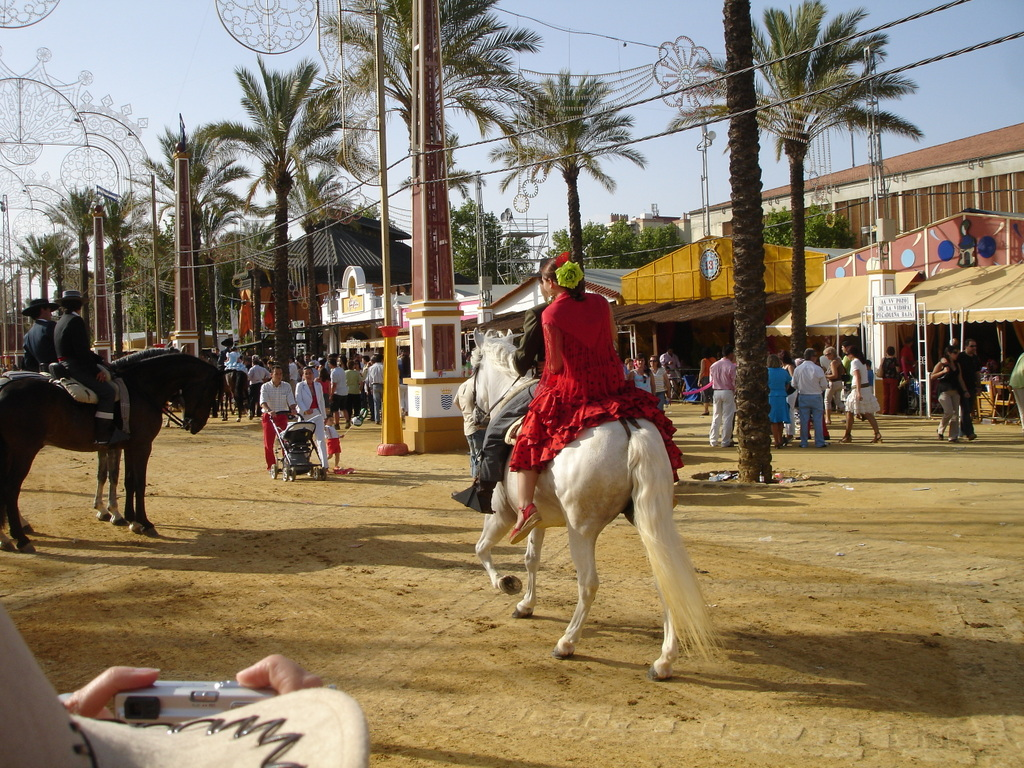
Horse Riding at Fair of Jerez de la Frontera

=== Campo de Gibraltar (Countryside of Gibraltar) ===
The towns that extend into the rural hinterlands north of Gibraltar are:

- Algeciras
- Jimena de la Frontera
- Castellar de la Frontera
- San Roque
- La Línea de la Concepción
- Los Barrios
- Tarifa
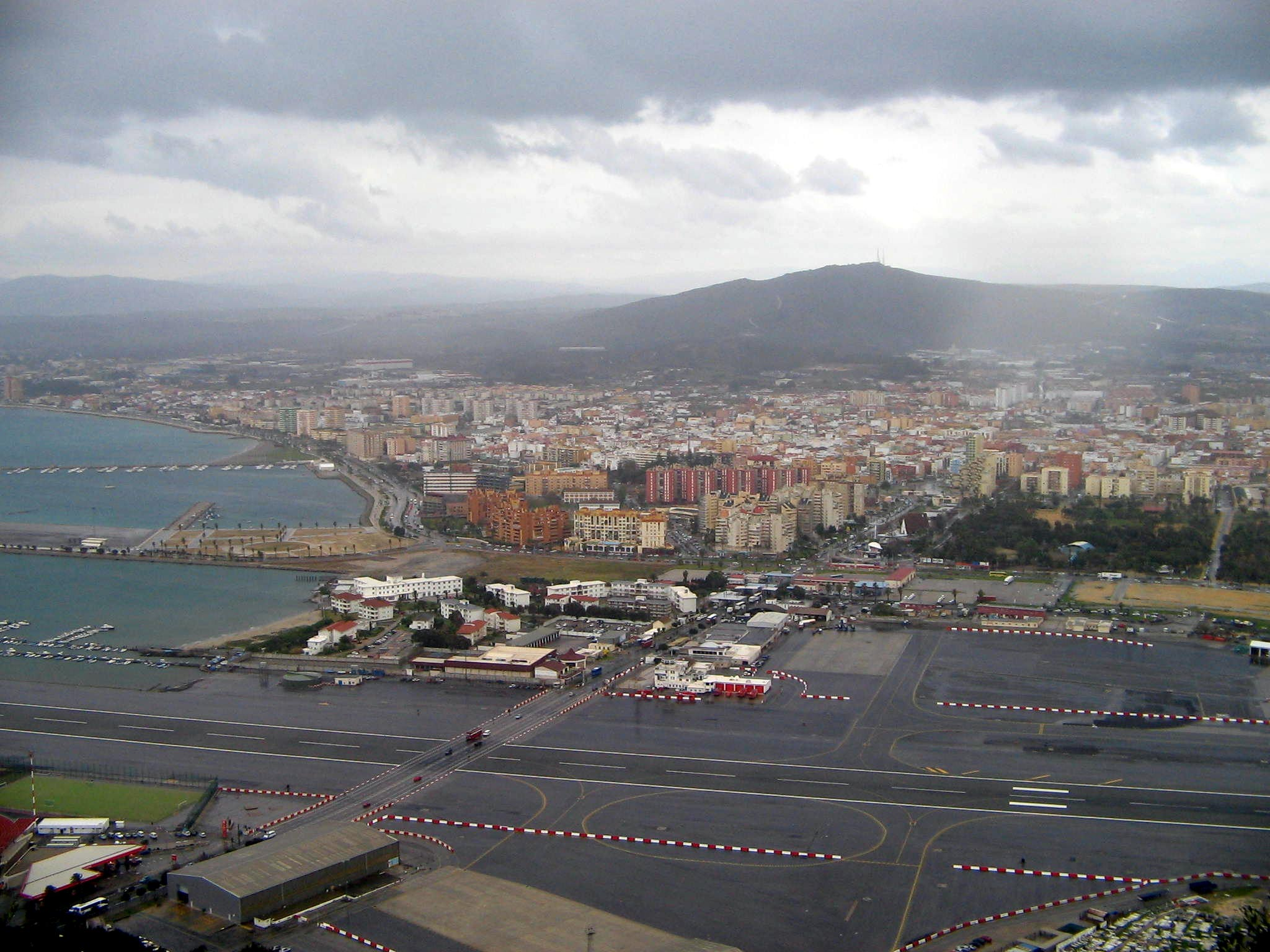
View of La Línea from the Rock of Gibraltar

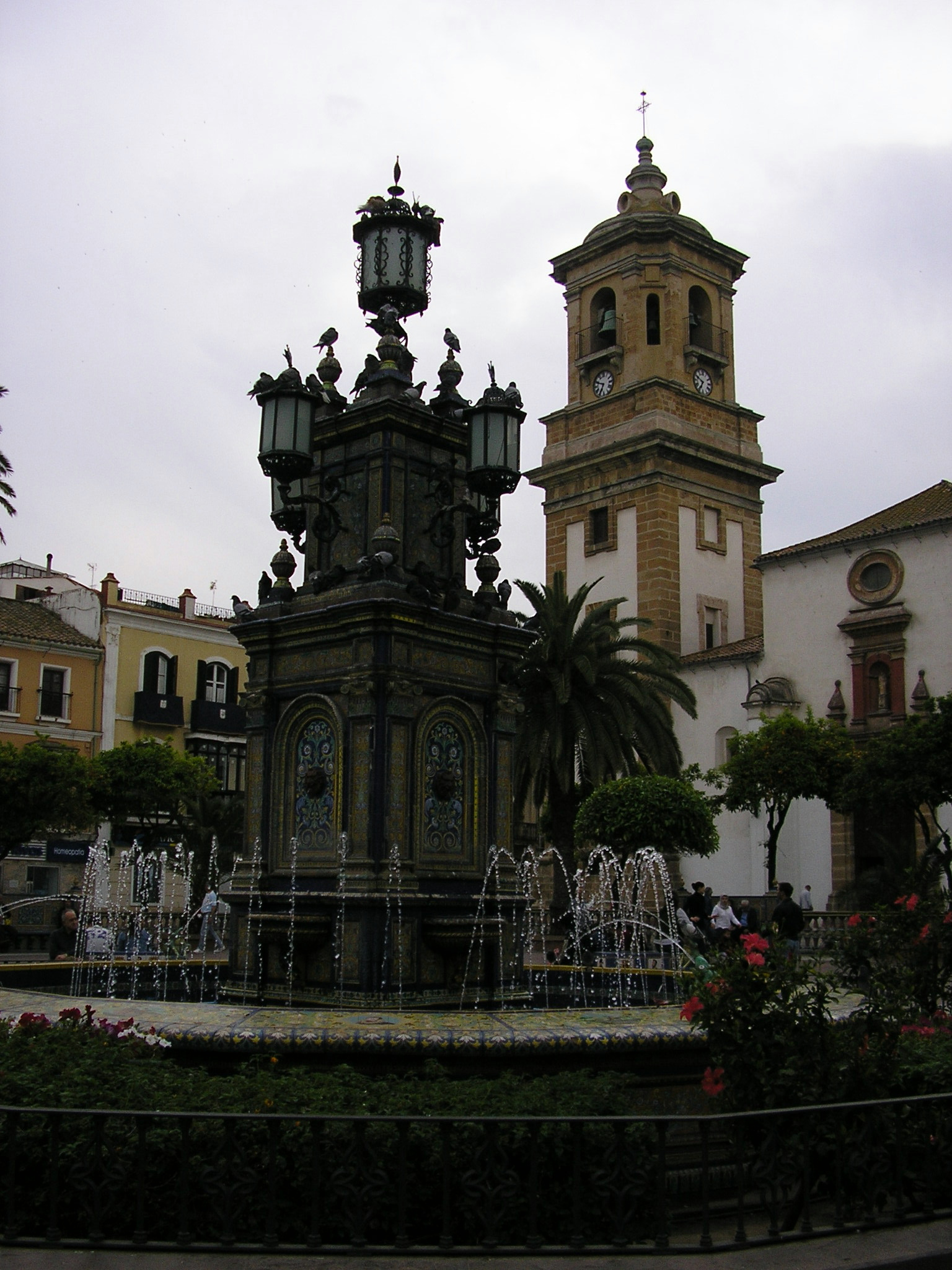
High plaza at Algeciras

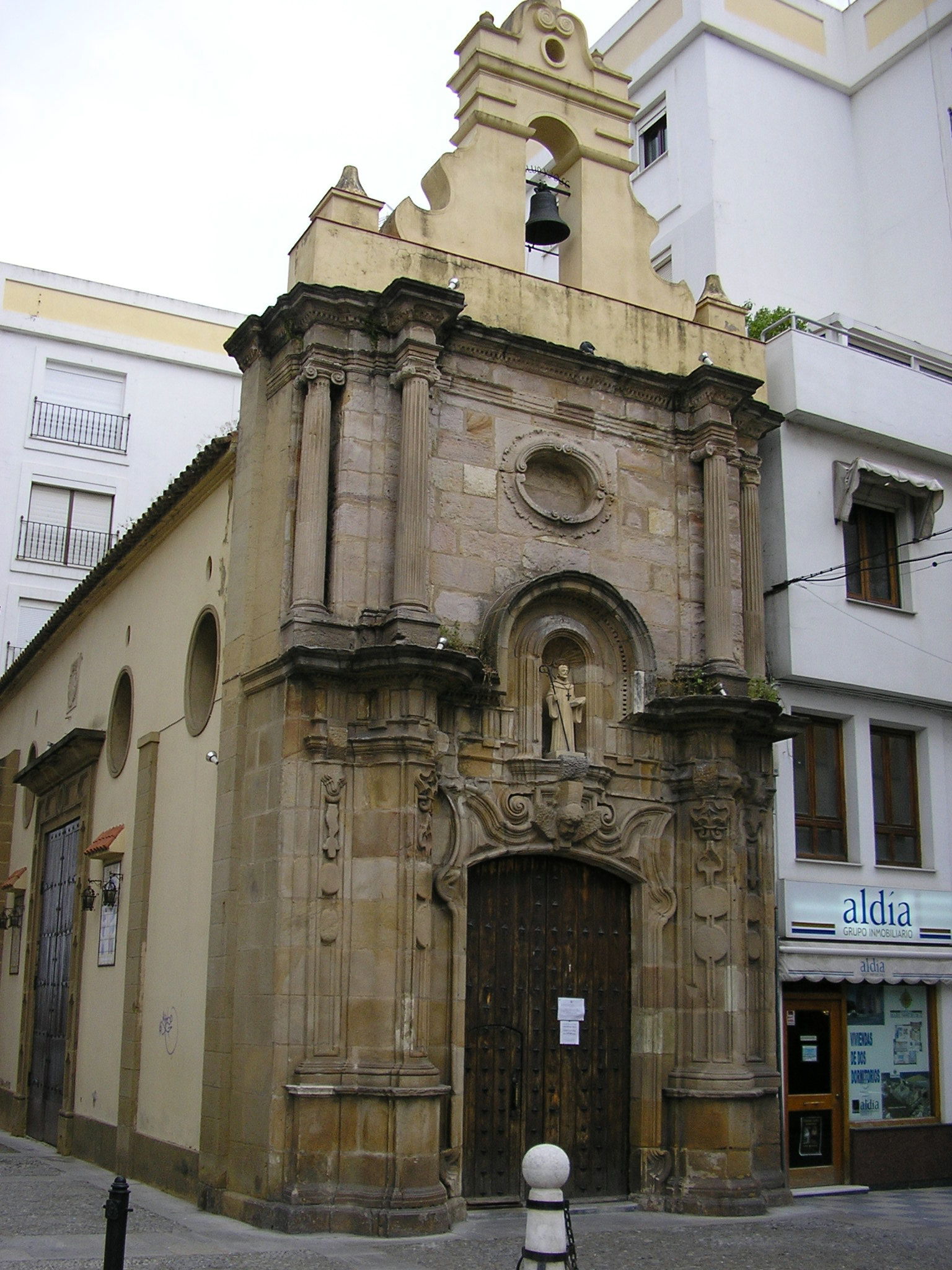
Chapel of Our Lady of Europe

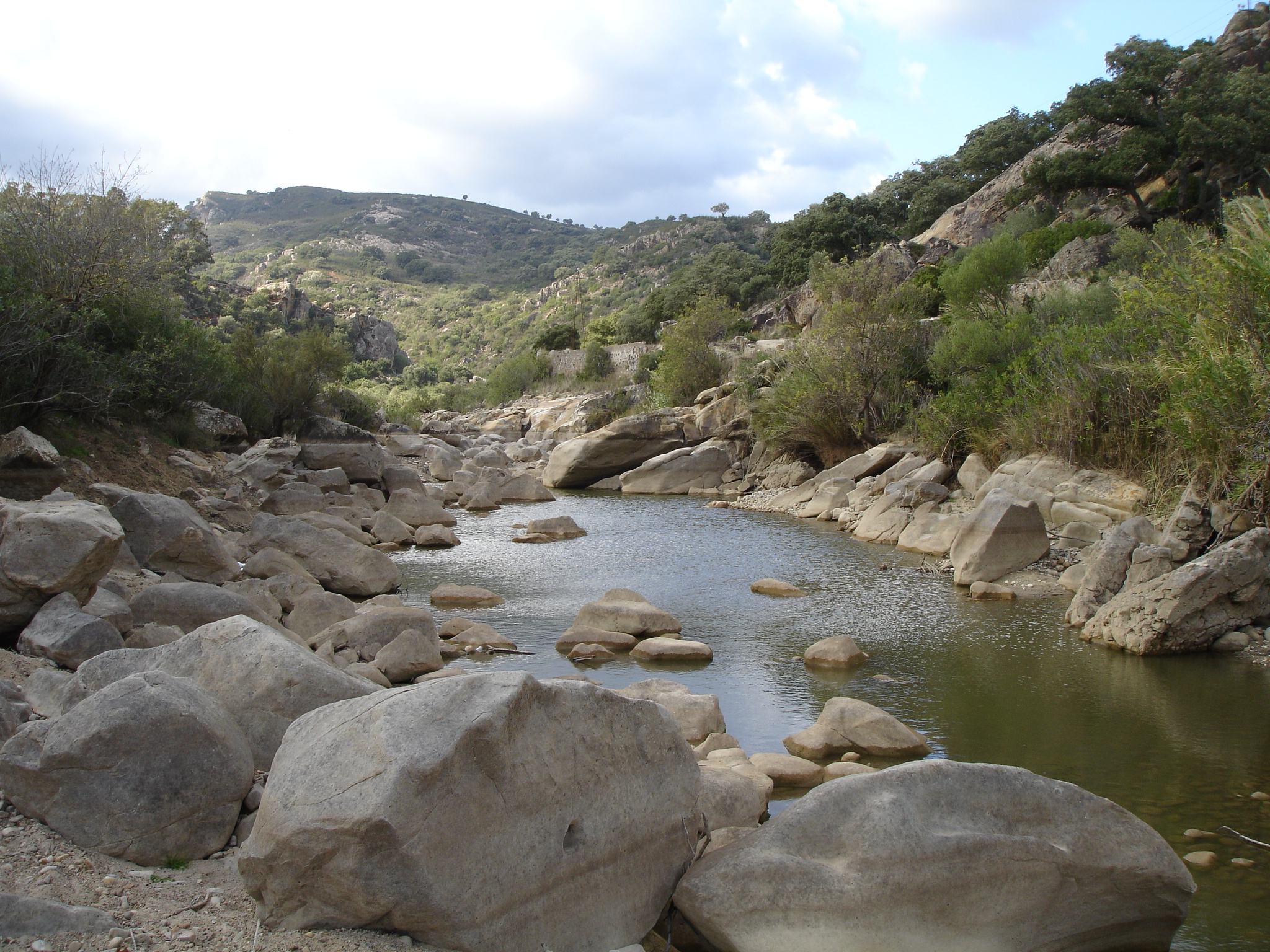
Hozgarganta river

=== Bajo Guadalquivir (Northwest Coast; also called Costa Noroeste) ===
The towns of this area called the "Bajo Guadalquivir" (lower Guadalquivir valley), are:

- Chipiona
- Rota
- Sanlúcar de Barrameda
- Trebujena
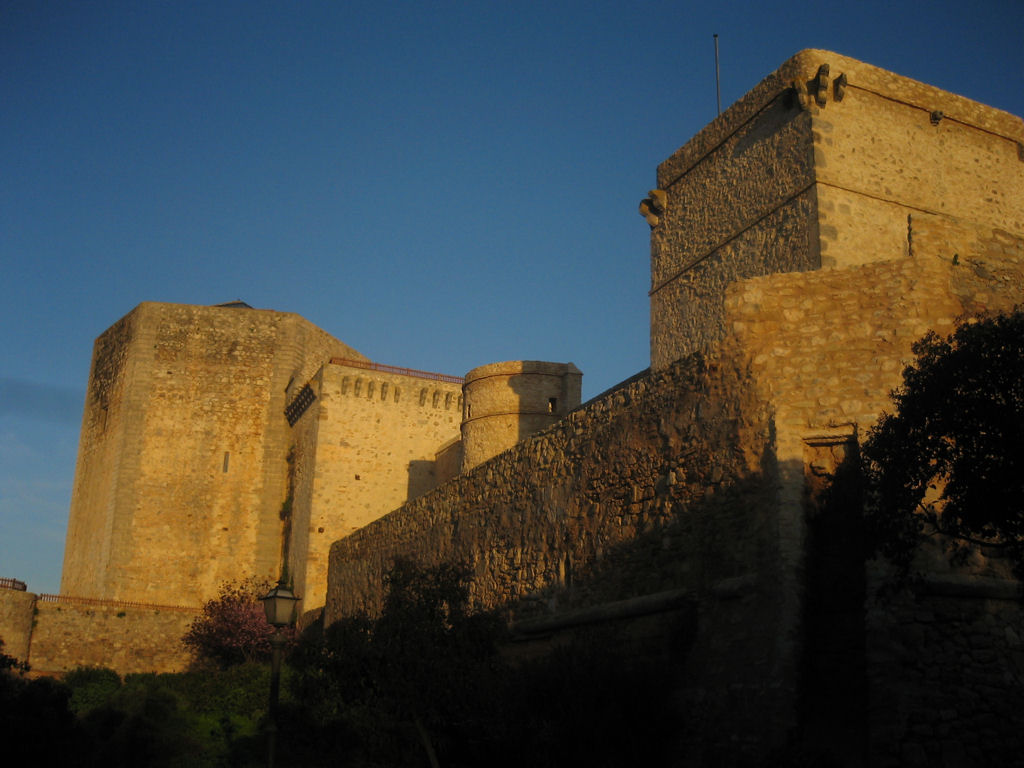
The castle of Santiago in Sanlúcar de Barrameda

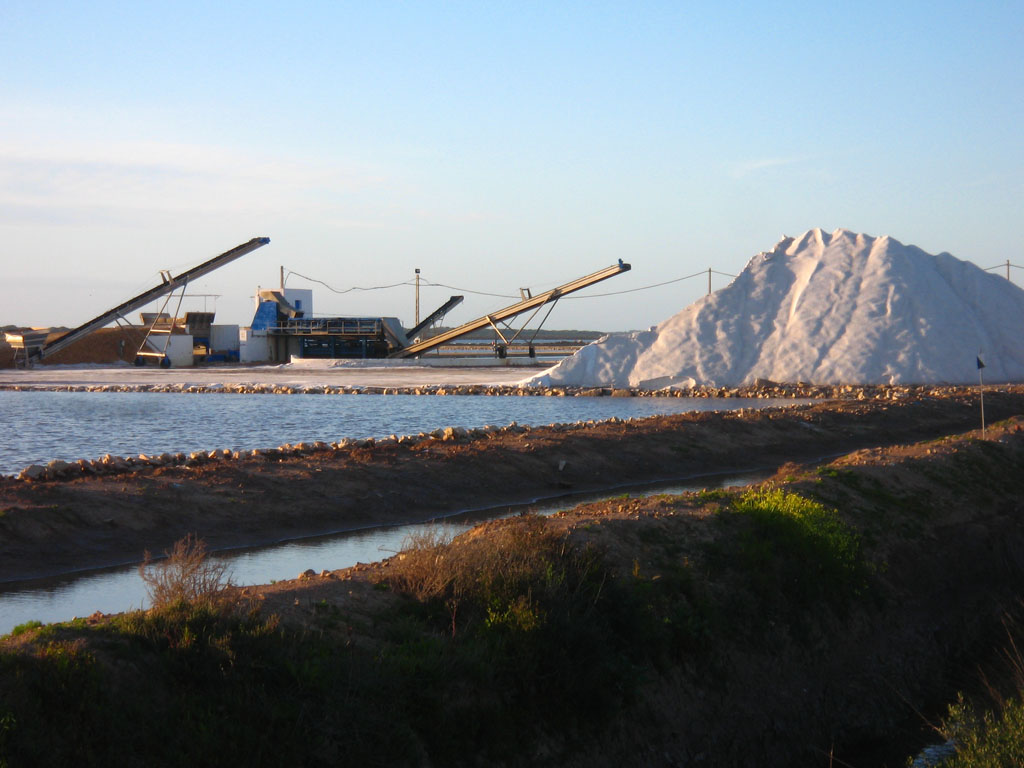
Salt mine at Sanlúcar

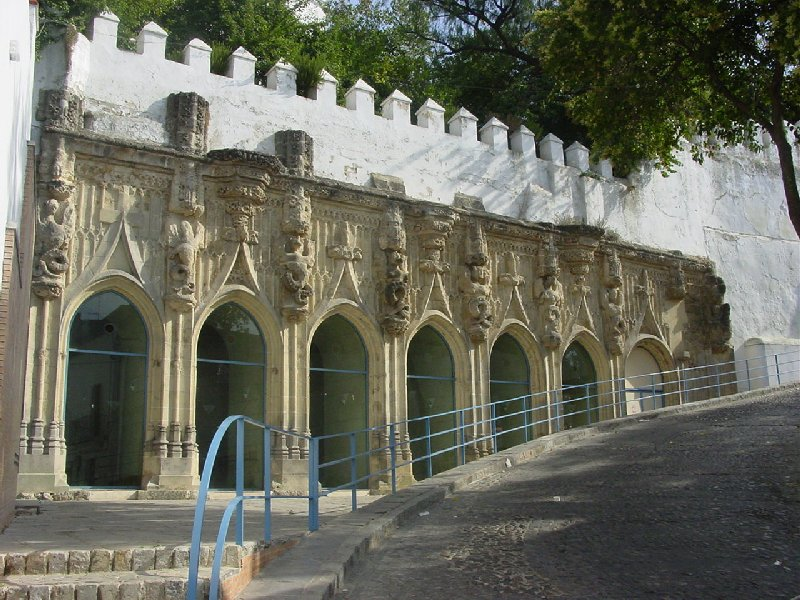
Las Covachas

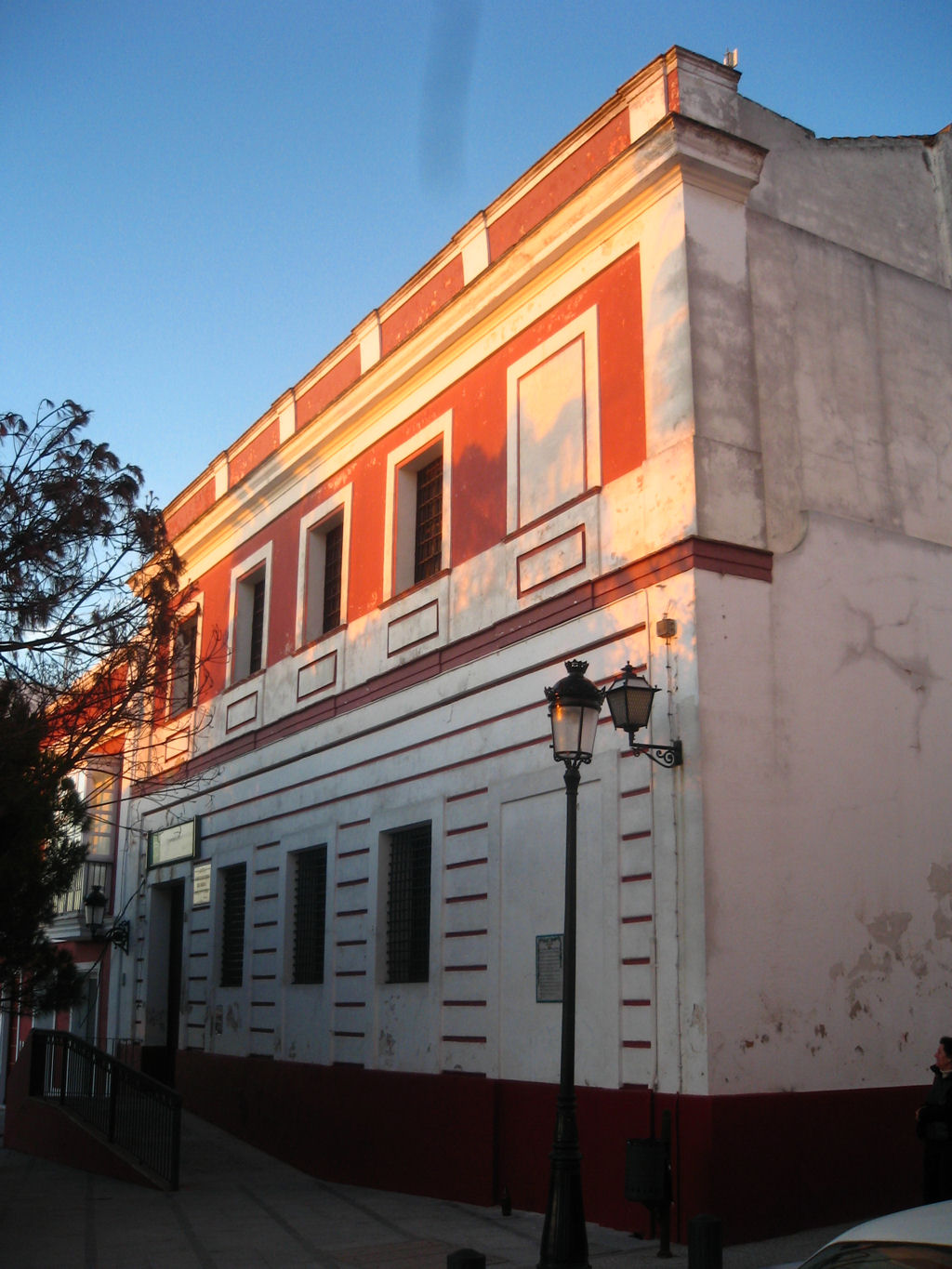
La Cárcel (now a conservatory)

=== La Janda ===
Towns included in La Janda, an area in the southwestern part of the province, are:

- Alcalá de los Gazules
- Barbate
- Benalup-Casas Viejas
- Conil de la Frontera
- Medina Sidonia
- Paterna de Rivera
- Vejer de la Frontera
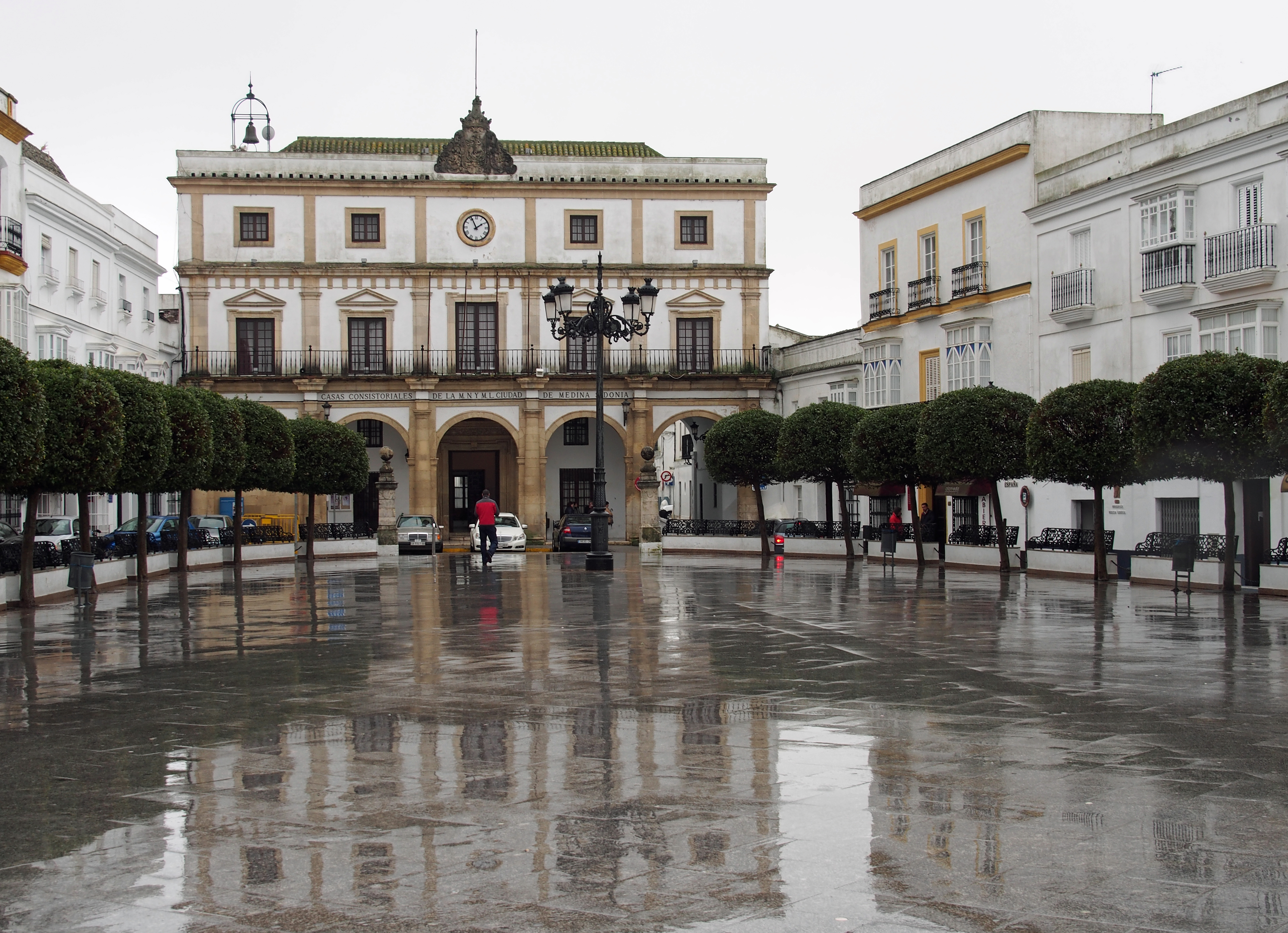
Casa Consistorial, Medina Sidonia

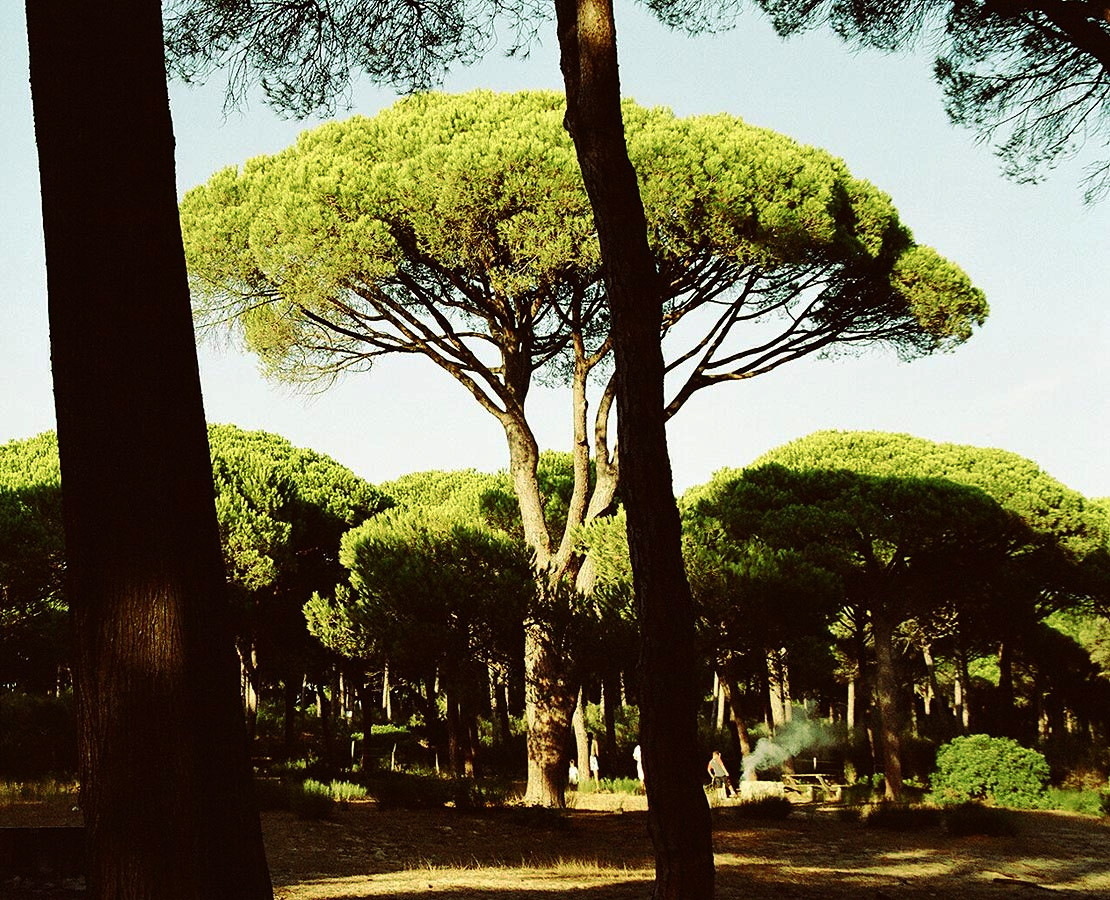
La Breña

Vejer de la Frontera

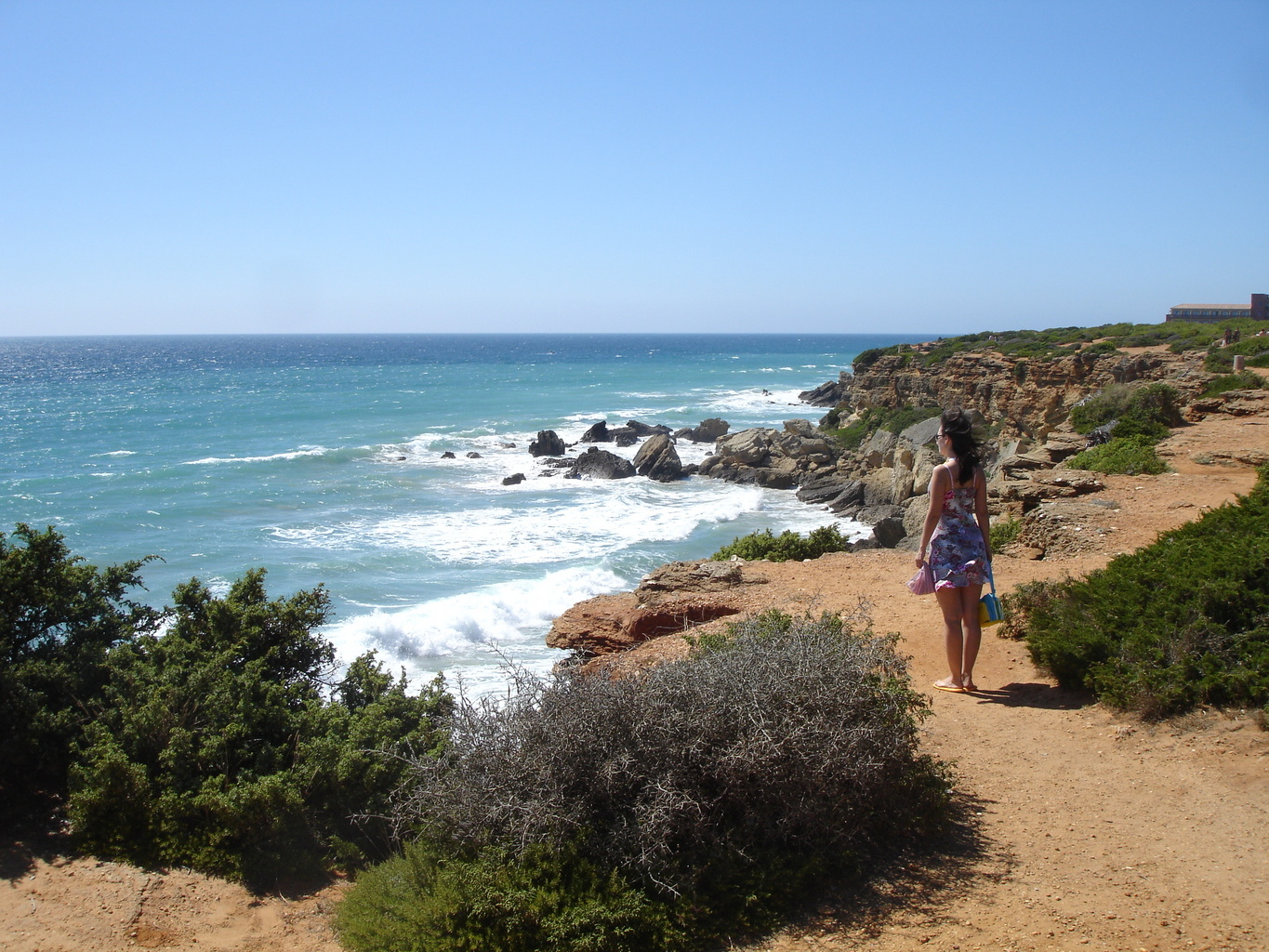
Beaches

=== Sierra de Cádiz (Cádiz Mountains) ===
Towns included in the Cádiz Mountains area, in the northeastern part of the province, include:

- Alcalá del Valle
- Algar
- Algodonales
- Arcos de la Frontera
- Benaocaz
- Bornos
- El Bosque
- El Gastor
- Espera
- Grazalema
- Olvera
- Prado del Rey
- Puerto Serrano
- Setenil de las Bodegas
- Torre Alháquime
- Ubrique
- Villaluenga del Rosario
- Villamartín
- Zahara de la Sierra
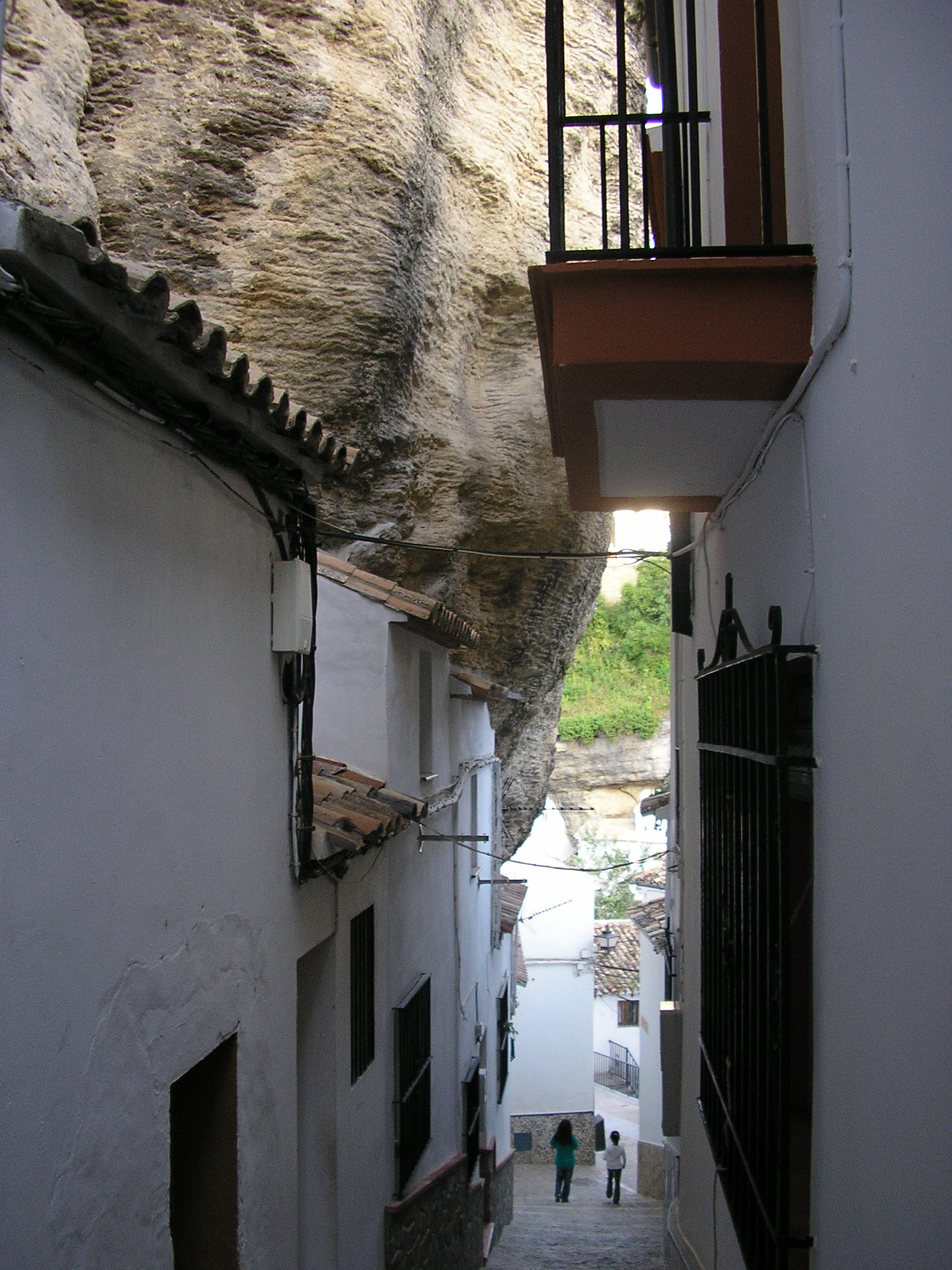
Setenil

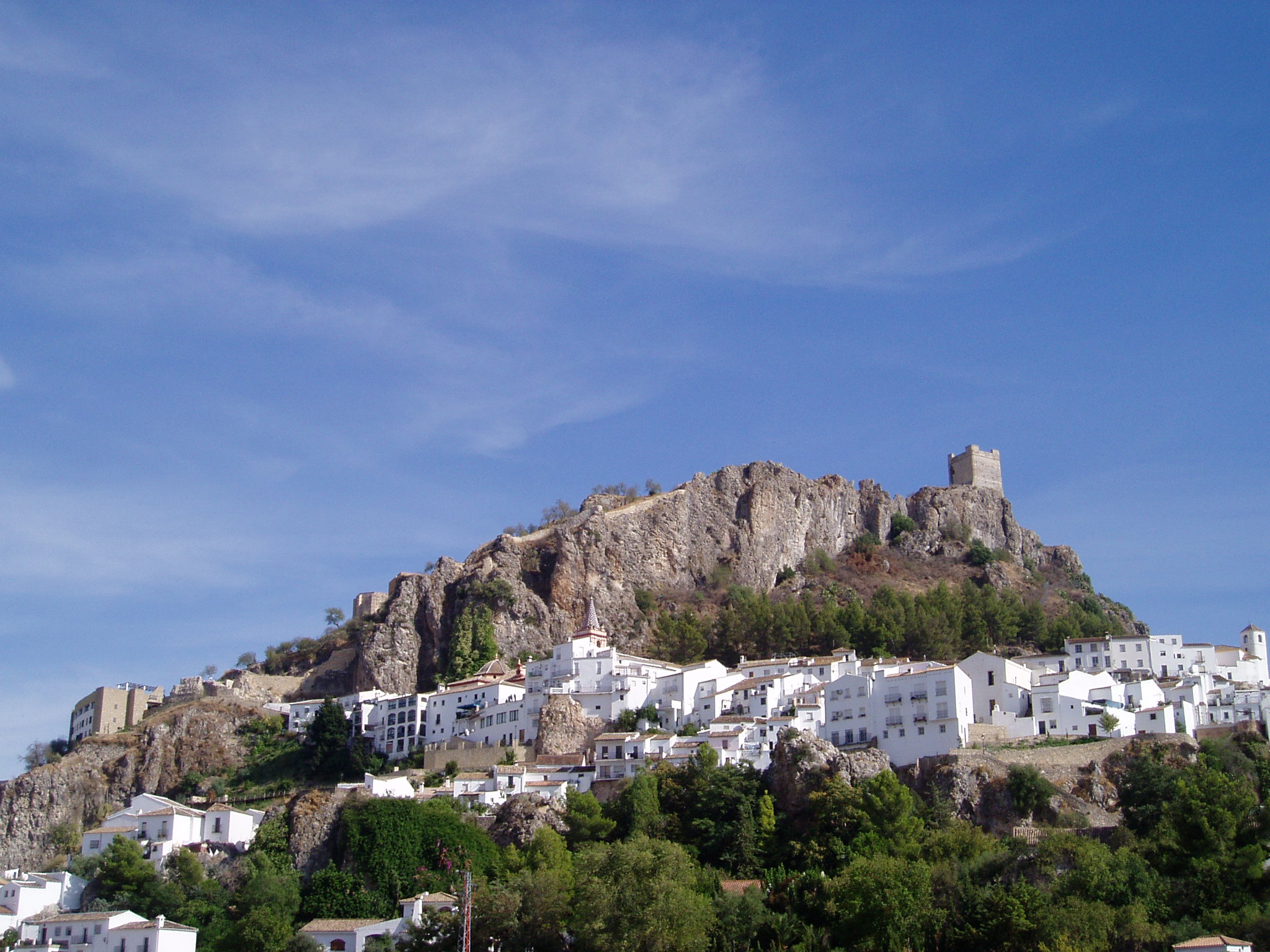
Zahara de la Sierra

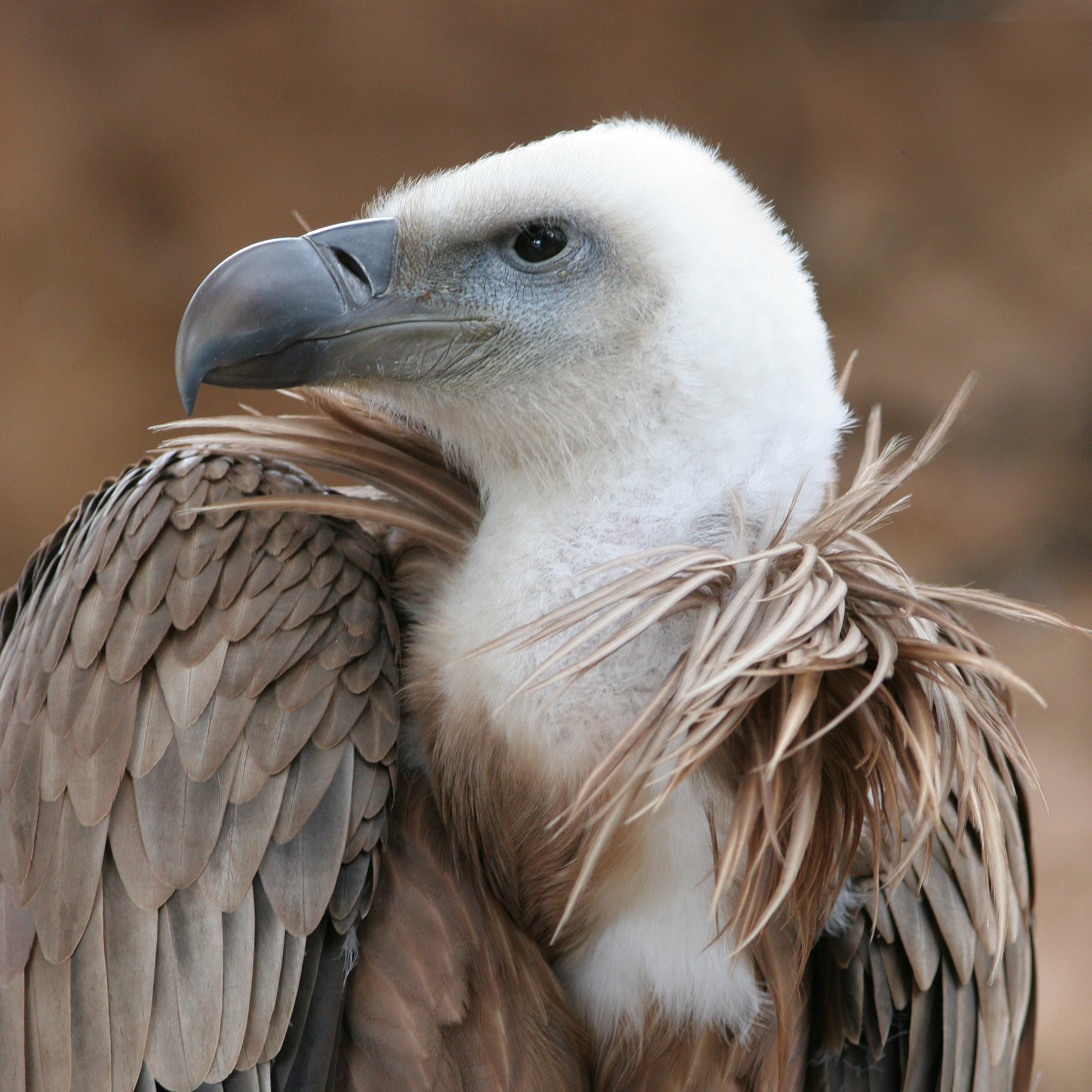
Griffon vultures are common in Alcalá del Valle

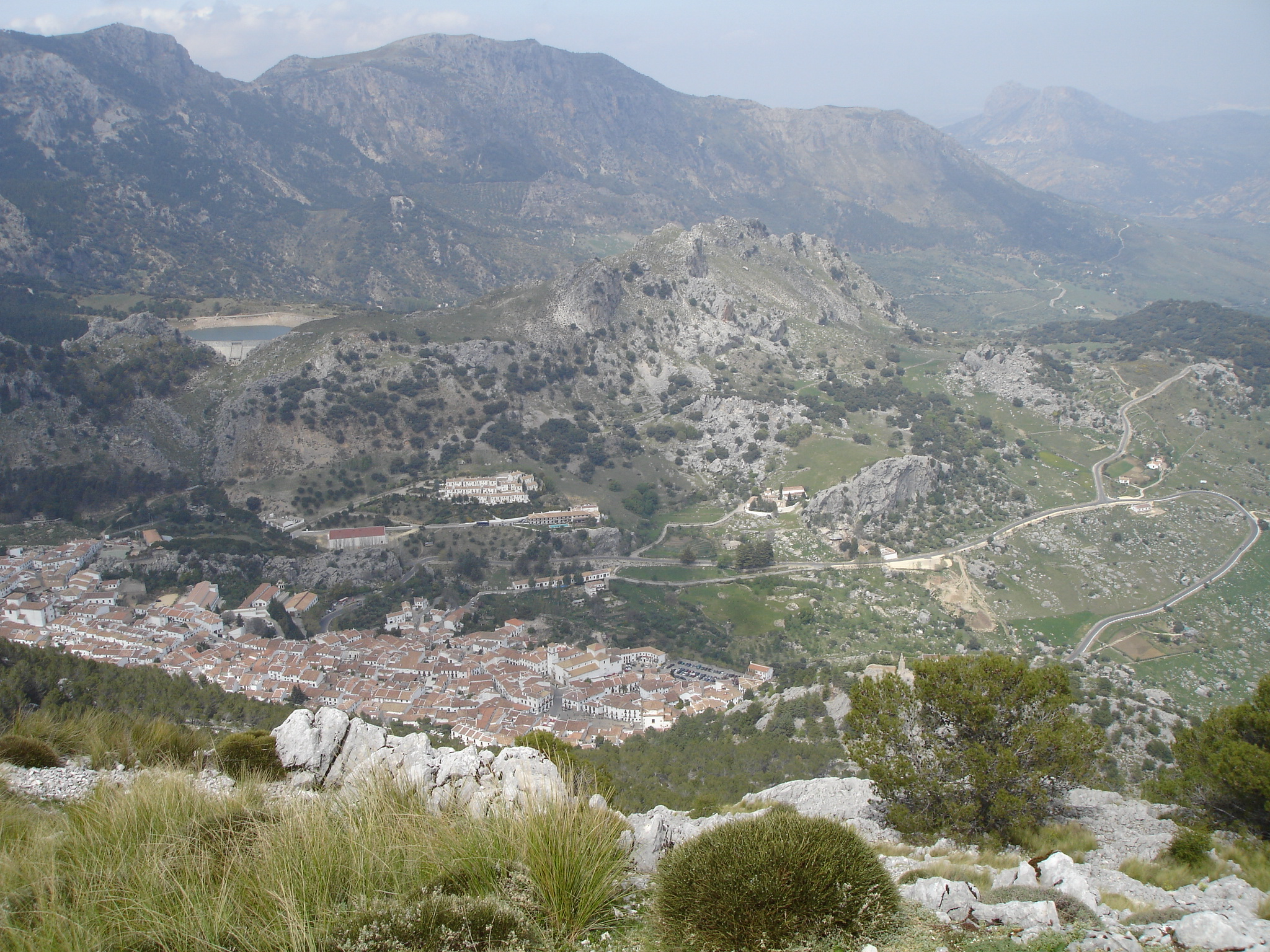
Grazalema from Endrinal mountains

== Geography ==
The highest point in the province is El Torreón which stands at 1,654 m above sea level.

== Climate ==
The entire province of Cádiz has a Mediterranean climate, mostly Köppen Csa but also Csb in high altitude areas. Large differences in summer temperatures exist between the three official stations in Cádiz, Jerez, and Tarifa depending on position relative to the coastline. Tarifa is exceptionally mild for such a southerly place in Spain, meanwhile winter temperatures are mild throughout the province with less difference between localities than in summer. Average yearly rainfall is 521 mm (20.5 in) in Cádiz, 573 mm (22.6 in) in Jerez, and 603 mm (23.7 in) in Tarifa. This is comparable to much cloudier climates further north in Europe, in spite of the high number of sunshine hours in the province. The Cádiz region is also much wetter than the arid Almería province further east in Andalusia.

Average daily maximum and minimum temperatures for cities in Province of Cádiz
Location	January	April	July	October
Cádiz	16.0 °C (60.8 °F)/ 9.4 °C (48.9 °F)	19.9 °C (67.8 °F)/ 13.7 °C (56.7 °F)	27.9 °C (82.2 °F)/ 22.0 °C (71.6 °F)	23.4 °C (74.1 °F)/ 17.3 °C (63.1 °F)
Jerez	16.2 °C (61.2 °F)/ 5.2 °C (41.4 °F)	22.2 °C (72.0 °F)/ 9.8 °C (49.6 °F)	33.5 °C (92.3 °F)/ 18.7 °C (65.7 °F)	25.5 °C (77.9 °F)/ 13.7 °C (56.7 °F)
Tarifa	15.1 °C (59.2 °F)/ 10.9 °C (51.6 °F)	17.3 °C (63.1 °F)/ 13.0 °C (55.4 °F)	24.5 °C (76.1 °F)/ 20.0 °C (68.0 °F)	20.6 °C (69.1 °F)/ 16.7 °C (62.1 °F)

== Demographics ==
As of 2025, the population is 1,261,420, of which 49.2% are male, and 50.8% are female. Minors make up 17.0% of the population, and seniors make up 19.2%.

Historical population

Year	Pop.	±%
1842	283,260	—
1857	383,078	+35.2%
1877	405,388	+5.8%
1887	410,426	+1.2%
1900	436,994	+6.5%
1910	447,056	+2.3%
1920	514,257	+15.0%
1930	511,591	−0.5%
1940	590,211	+15.4%

Year	Pop.	±%
1950	693,267	+17.5%
1960	812,680	+17.2%
1970	878,602	+8.1%
1981	988,388	+12.5%
1991	1,078,404	+9.1%
2001	1,116,491	+3.5%
2011	1,244,732	+11.5%
2021	1,249,873	+0.4%

Source: INE

=== Immigration ===
As of 2025, immigrants make up 7.6% of the population. The 5 largest foreign countries of birth are Morocco, the United Kingdom, Colombia, Germany, and Argentina.

== Economy ==
In 2014 the unemployment rate was 42%, the highest in the country. The main industry is tourism, mainly from non-coastal Spanish cities, Germany and the UK. Its once-important shipbuilding industry (Astilleros) is now in crisis due to competition from South Korea and China. There are factories of Airbus and Delphi. It also exports sherry as well as alimentary products.

=== Primary sector ===
- Sherry production
- John Harvey & Sons in Jerez de la Frontera
- Gonzalez Byass
- Olive groves
- Fishing Ports, as in Cádiz and Algeciras.
- Cork products from the Alcornocales cork-oak forests

=== Major industrial facilities ===
- Navantia
- Airbus
- CASA
- Delphi
- Ford
- Cepsa
- Lufthansa CityLine
- Endesa
- Acerinox

Sector	Main activities	% GDP
1°	Agriculture, Animal husbandry and fishing.	4%
2°	Industry (energy, industry and construction)	28%
3°	Services (tourism, hostelery and public administration)	67%

== Tourism ==
=== Beaches ===
The province of Cádiz has many kilometres of beaches and (as of 2005) the highest number of Blue Flags of all coastal provinces in Europe.

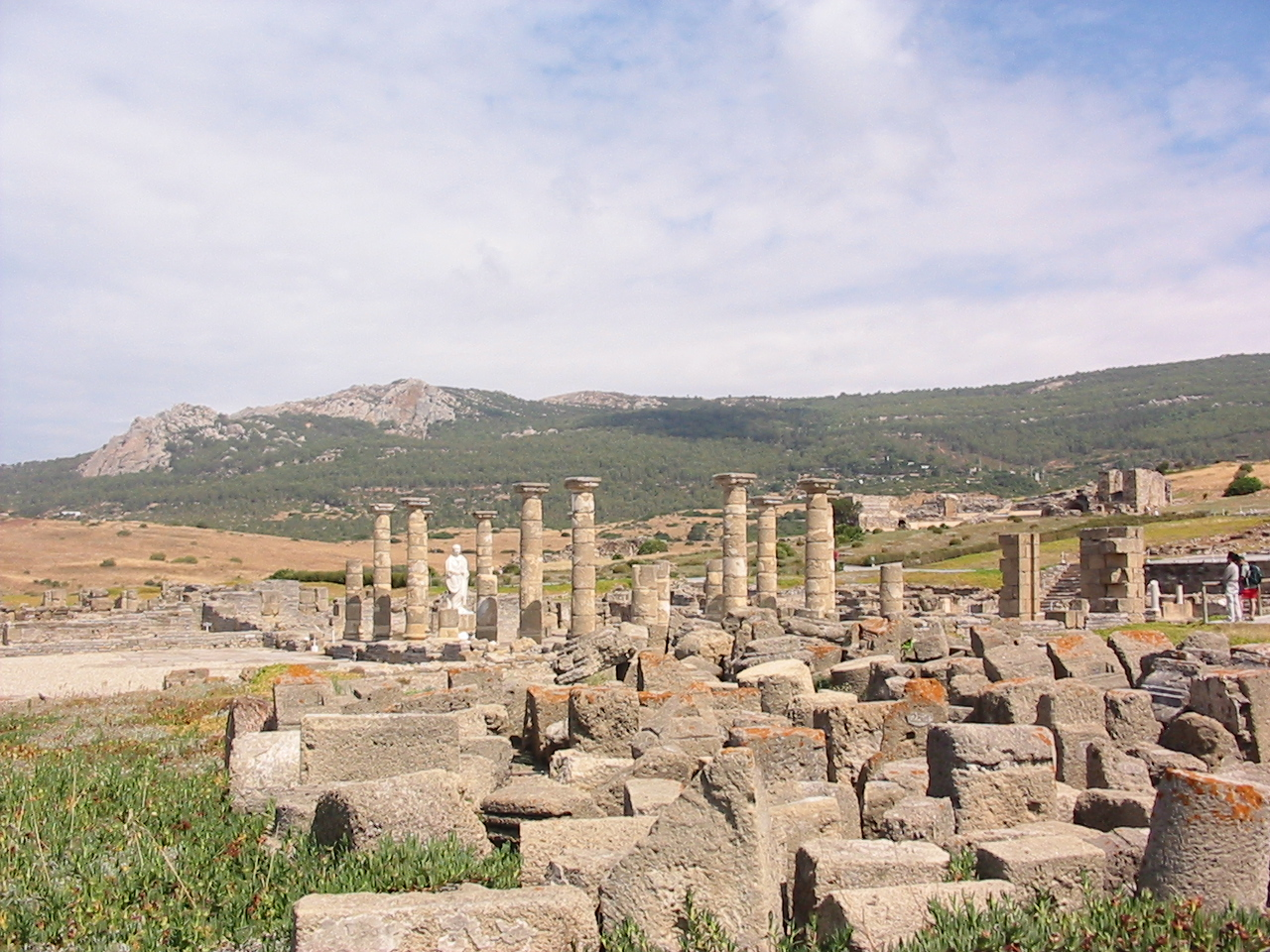
Baelo Claudia

Some of these beaches are relatively wild and far from big urban areas. One of the attractions of the area is its contrast to the mass tourism on the Mediterranean coast. There are extensive nature reserves in the region and the unspoilt feel of the area is heightened by the presence of wild animals including cows and horses on many stretches of beach.

The Costa de la Luz has traditionally been a popular destination for Spaniards wanting to enjoy the beach while avoiding the stifling heat of the Mediterranean Coast, although until recently this largely unspoilt Atlantic coastline was little known to foreign visitors. One of the factors that brought the region to the attention of foreign holidaymakers was the growing realisation that its Southern reaches are one of the world's best locations for wind sports.

Tarifa, located on the Strait of Gibraltar at the southernmost point of mainland Europe, has become Europe's kitesurfing destination as a result of the area's wind phenomena, sunny summer weather and the variety of beaches, such as Los Caños de Meca, Bolonia, Punta Paloma, and especially Playa de Los Lances, where in the summer months over 1,000 kites are often seen in the air. The local economy has benefited significantly from the wind sport explosion: there are more than 50 kite schools in Tarifa and hundreds of shops, bars and hotels serving the many thousands of kitesurfers who visit every year.

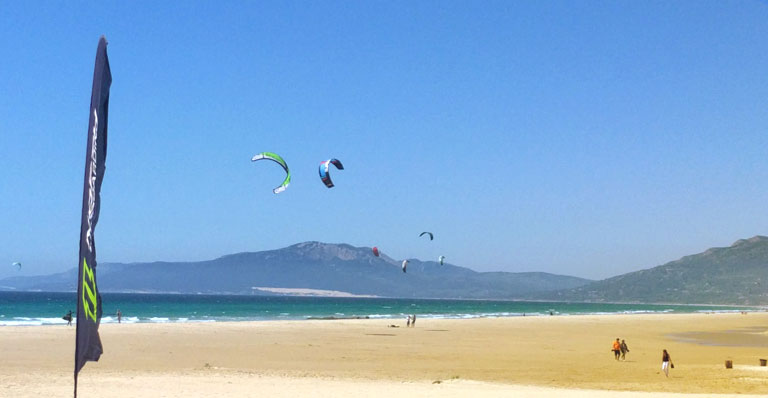
Playa de Los Lances, Tarifa, Cádiz, Andalusia, Spain

Notable beaches:

- Playa La Barrosa in Chiclana de la Frontera
- Playa La Victoria in Cádiz
- Playa de Levante in El Puerto de Santa María
- Playa de Bolonia in Tarifa
- Playa de Camposoto in San Fernando
- Los Canos de Meca
- Playa de Los Lances in Tarifa

=== Events ===
- Carnival of Cádiz
- Feria de Jerez
- Semana Santa in all municipalities of the Province
- Horse racing in Sanlúcar de Barrameda
- Circuito Permanente de Jerez
- White Towns of Andalusia
- Ruta del Toro

=== Nature ===
==== Doñana National Park ====
Doñana National Park is one of two national parks in the autonomous community of Andalusia. A small area of the park extends into Cádiz Province, just north of Sanlucar de Barrameda and on the south bank of the Rio Guadalquivir. This area is primarily marismas. The public have access to a recreational area and a short walking trail. There is no direct access to the bulk of the park that lies on the north bank of the river in the provinces of Seville and Huelva.

==== Natural parks ====
===== Bahía de Cádiz Natural Park =====
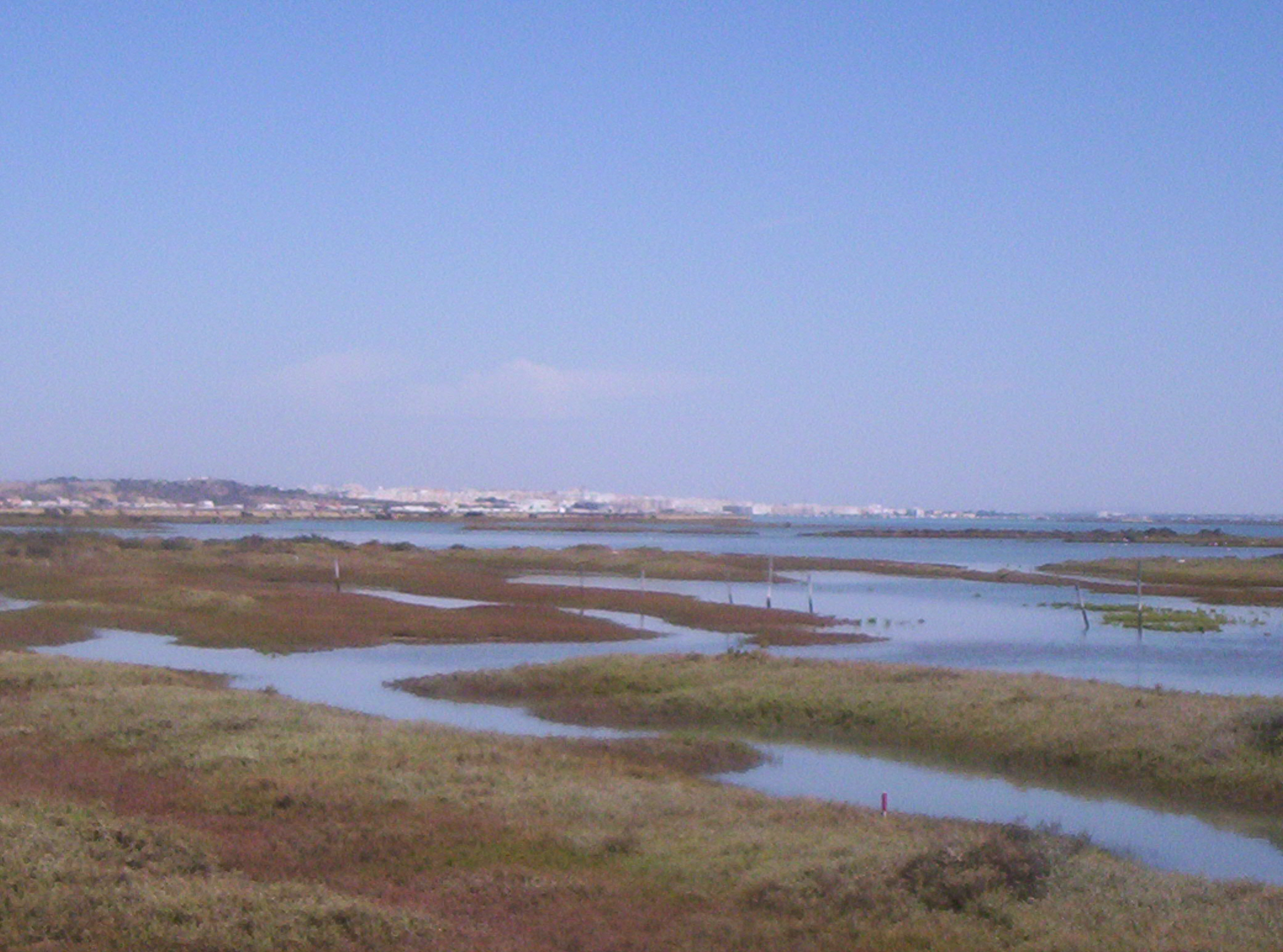
Caño de Sancti Petri from Chiclana and San Fernando at the end

100 km^{2}, located at the mouth of the Guadalete river, consists of marshland, beaches, reed and sand dunes.
Bird watching. Sailing, windsurfing, hiking.
(Ocean) Pine. Many types of shrubs and bushes.
Gannet solan goose, stork, cormorant, great crested grebe, (sea)gull, flamingo, tern, sea eagle, avocet.

===== La Breña y Marismas del Barbate Natural Park =====
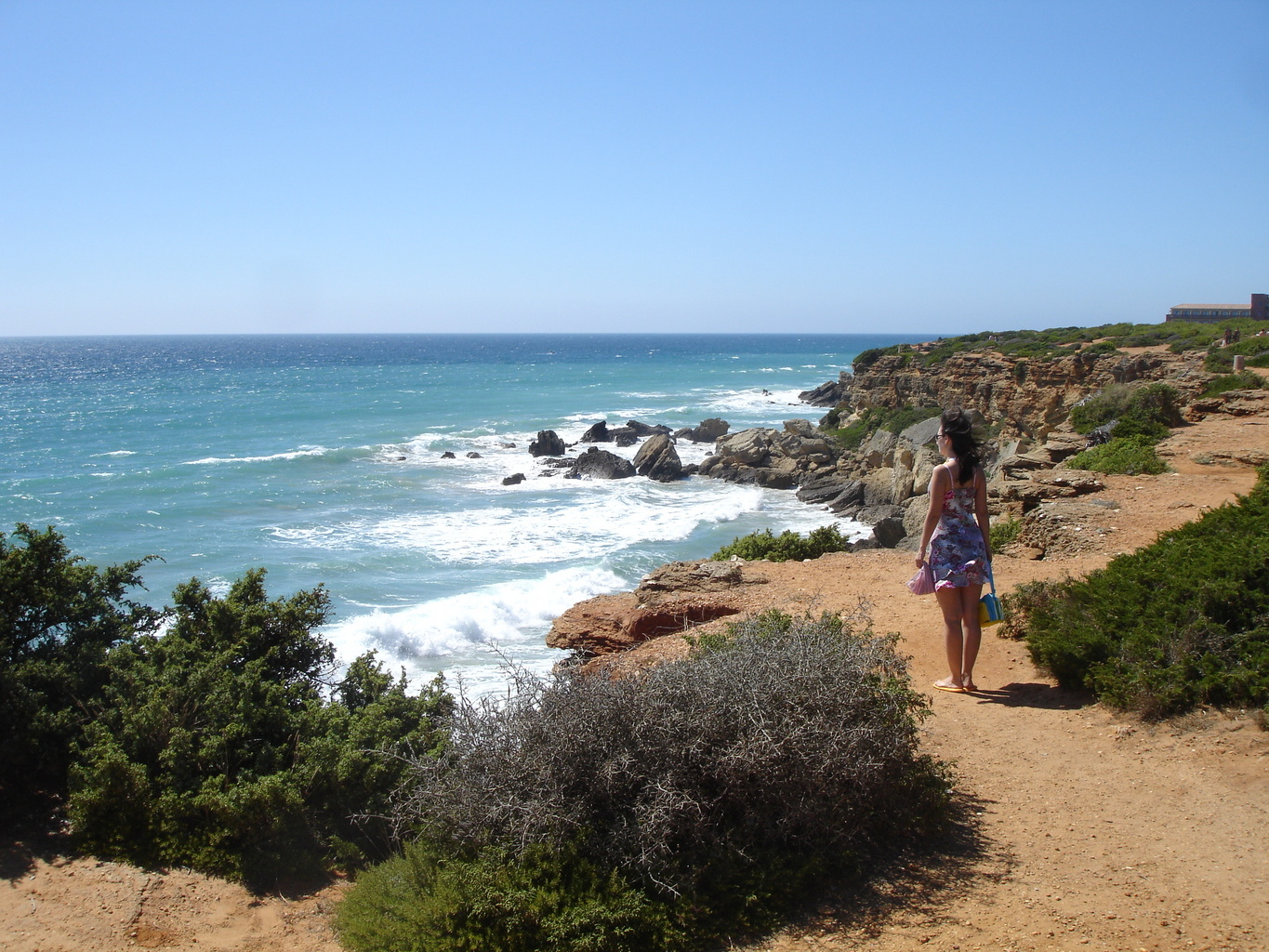
Cliffs

37.97 km^{2}, high cliff rock formations covered by pine trees.
Bird watching, archeological and botanical excursions, diving, windsurfing, sailing, hiking.
Strandpine, black juniper tree, black spruce, juniper, small palm tree, rosemary.
Herring gull, chaffinch, greenfinch, cattle egret, little egret, crested tit, woodpecker, kestrel, peregrine falcon.

===== La Doñana Natural Park =====
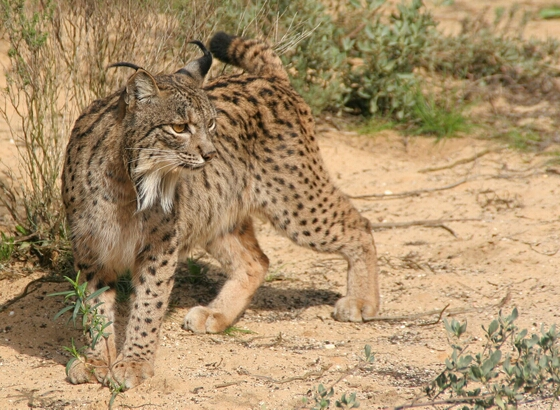
Iberian lynx

This natural park is shared by three provinces, Cádiz, Huelva and Seville. It is an area to the east and northeast of the national park.
Home of the Iberian lynx, a protected species.

===== Los Alcornocales Natural Park =====
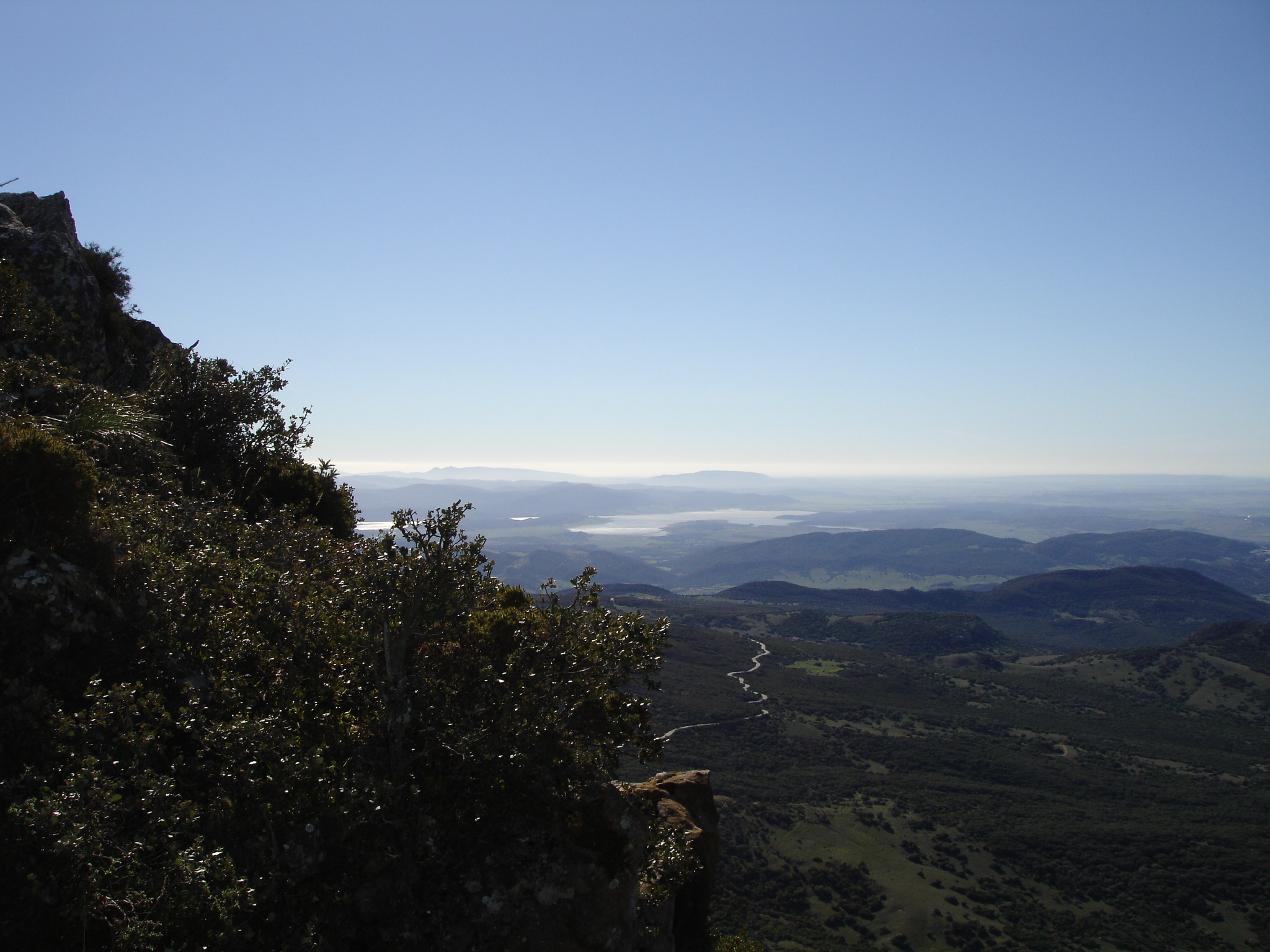
View from the top of El Picacho peak

Information center in Alcalá de los Gazules; visitor centers in Algeciras and Cortes de la Frontera (Málaga).
1,700.25 km^{2} in area.
Low mountain range, densely covered by cork oak trees ("Alcornoques").
Bird watching, archeological and botanical excursions, hiking, mountain biking, speleology.
Cork oak, olive tree, gall oak, pink rock rose, small palm tree, alder, rhododendron, holly, bracken (fern), cherry tree, laurel.
Sparrow hawk, short-toed snake eagle, booted eagle, goshawk, eagle owl, tawny owl, culture, kestrel, peregrine falcon, wild boar, deer, weasel, (sea)otter, wildcat, mongoose.

===== Sierra de Grazalema Natural Park =====
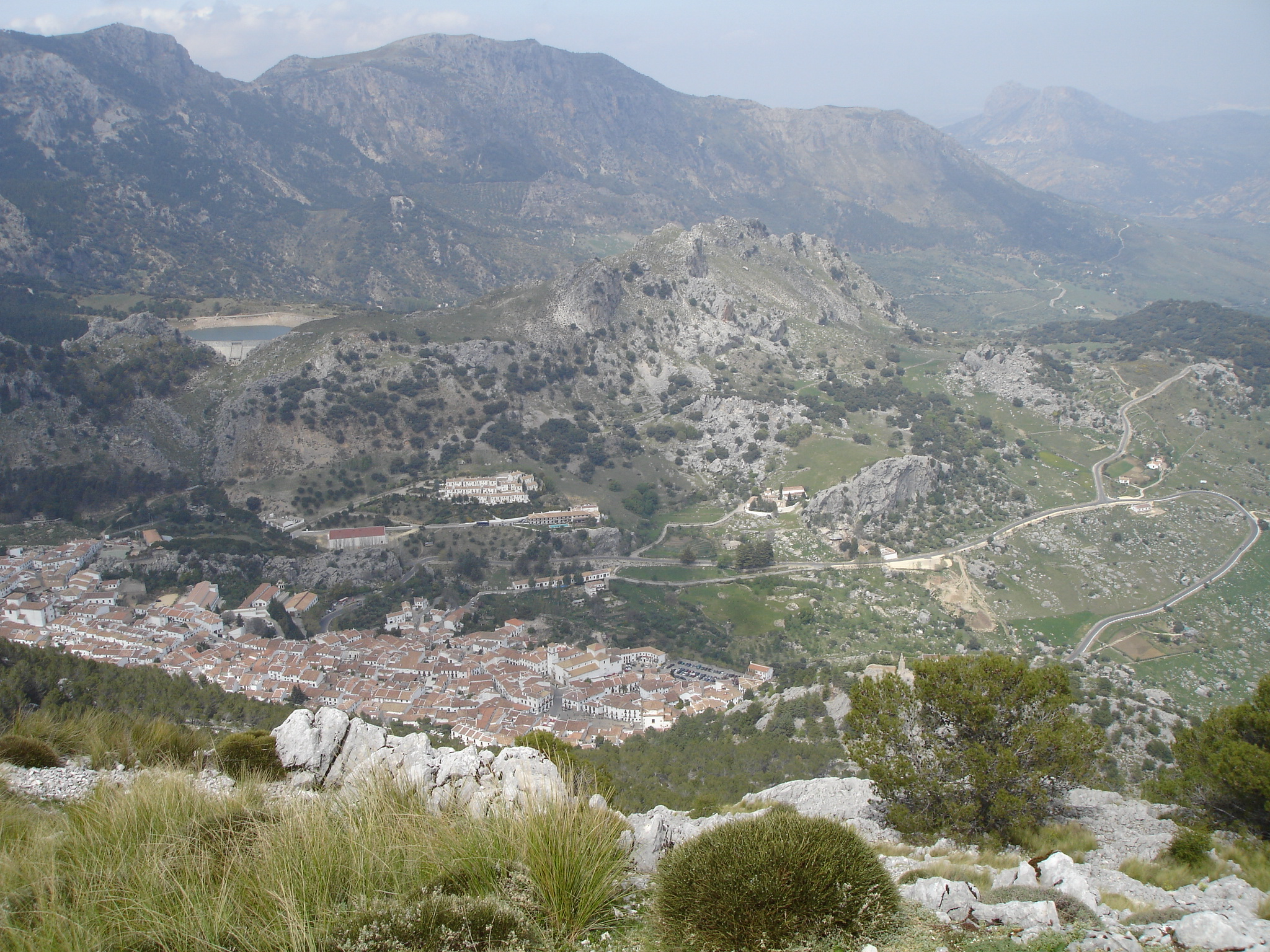
Grazalema from Endrinal mountains

Administration in El Bosque; visitors' center in El Bosque.
516.95 km^{2} in area.
Limestone formation, transformed to ravines, declines and caves. Large colonies of Spanish fir ("pinsapo").
Bird watching, archeological and botanical excursions.
Hiking, climbing, mountain biking, speleology, paragliding.
Spanish fir, cork oak, holm oak, gall oak, carob, oleaster.
Imperial eagle, golden eagle, fish hawk, vulture, Egyptian vulture, mountain goat, deer, mongoose, (sea)otter, fox.

===== Straits of Gibraltar Natural Park =====
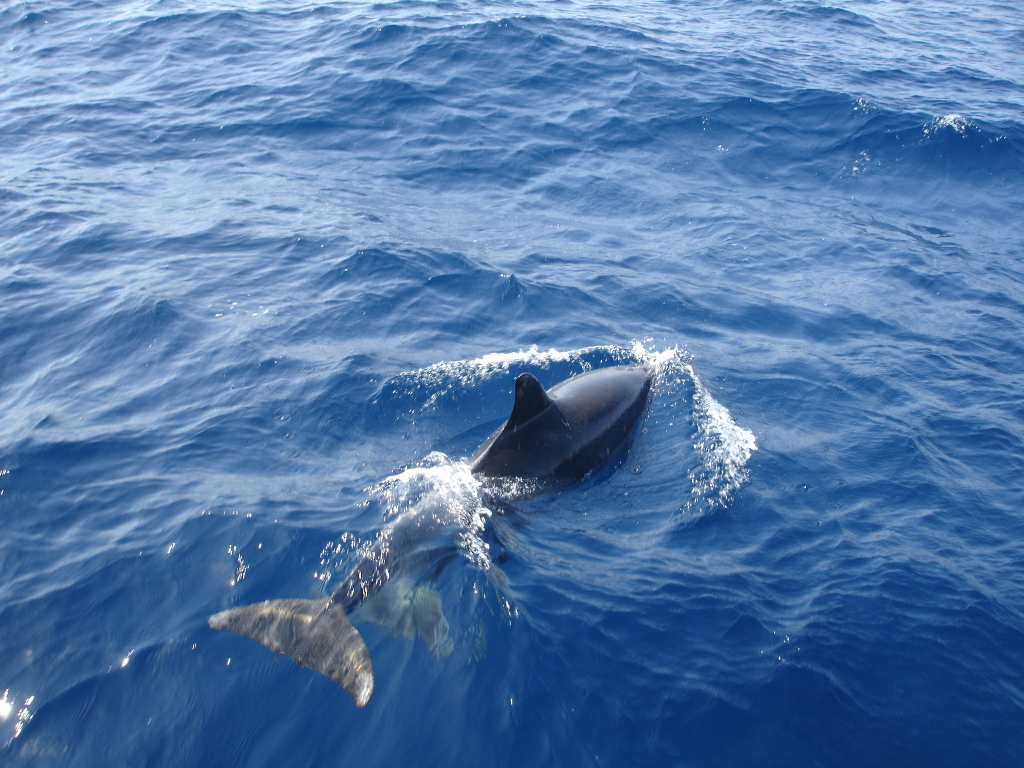
Cetacea in the strait

Is the most meridional national park of Europe.
Its location at the southernmost point of mainland Spain, and of mainland Europe, at the point where the Atlantic Ocean and the Mediterranean Sea meet in the Strait of Gibraltar, places it on the migratory route for many birds.

==== Natural reserves ====
There are eight natural reserves in the province: Complejo Endorreico de Chiclana, Complejo Endorreico de Espera, Complejo Endorreico de Puerto Real, Complejo Endorreico del Puerto de Santa María, Laguna de Medina, Lagunas de las Canteras y el Tejón, Laguna de la Paja, and Peñón de Zaframagón (which straddles the border with the province of Seville.)

==== Natural sites ====
There are seven natural sites in the province: Cola del Embalse de Arcos, Cola del Embalse de Bornos, Estuario del Río Guadiaro, Isla del Trocadero, Marismas de Sancti Petri, Marismas del Río Palmones, and Playa de Los Lances.

Parques Periurbanos: Pinares y Dunas de San Antón La Suara La Barrosa

==== Natural monuments ====
There are five natural monuments in the province: Corrales de Rota, Duna de Bolonia, Punta del Boquerón, Tómbolo de Trafalgar, and Escarpes del Río Trejo en Setenil.

== Transport ==
=== Roads ===
- Autovía A-4
- Autovía A-7
- Autovía A-381
- N-340
- Autovía A-48

=== Airports ===
- Jerez Airport

=== Railroads ===
- Cádiz-Seville Line
- Cercanías Cádiz
- Algeciras-Granada Line

=== Ports ===
- Port of Algeciras
- Port of Cádiz

The main ways to enter the province are by road from Seville or Malaga and by the Jerez Airport.

== Sports ==
=== Football ===
- Cádiz CF in the Segunda División. (LFP)
- Real Balompédica Linense in the Tercera Federación - Group 10.
- Algeciras CF in the Primera Federación - Group 2.
- Racing Club Portuense in the División de Honour - Group 1.
- Xerez CD & Xerez Deportivo in the Segunda Federación - Group 4.
- Chiclana CF in the Tercera Federación - Group 10

=== Rugby Union ===
- CR Atlético Portuense in the 1ª División Regional.

== See also ==
- List of Bienes de Interés Cultural in Cádiz
