= Bahía de Cádiz Natural Park =

Natural park in Cádiz, Spain

- Parque Natural de la Bahía de Cádiz
- IUCN category V (protected landscape/seascape)
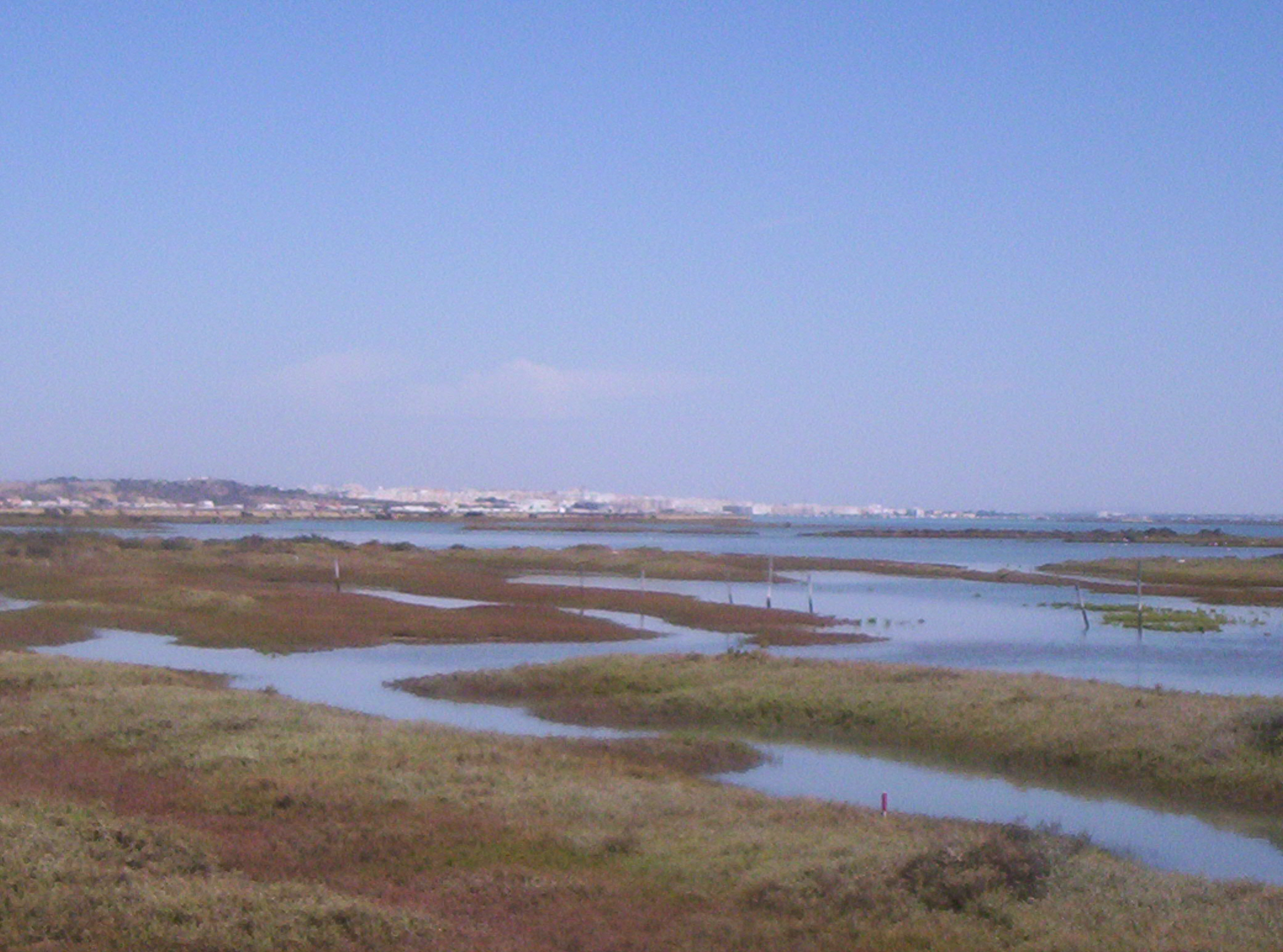
- Caño de Sancti Petri from Chiclana and San Fernando at the end

- Location within Spain
- Location: Cádiz Province, Andalusia, Spain
- Nearest city: San Fernando
- Coordinates: 36.4732°N 6.17°W
- Area: 10,522 hectares (26,000 acres)
- Established: 1989
- Website: Bahia de Cadiz

Ramsar Wetland
- Official name: Bahía de Cádiz
- Designated: 24 October 2002
- Reference no.: 1265

Bahía de Cádiz Natural Park (Spanish: Parque Natural de la Bahía de Cádiz) is a 10,522-hectare (26,000-acre) natural park located in the province of Cádiz (Andalusia, Spain). It was established in 1989.

== Nature ==
Located at the mouth of the Guadalete river, it consists of marshland, beaches, reed and sand dunes. It has many types of shrubs and bushes, and ocean pine.

Recreational activities include bird watching, sailing, windsurfing and hiking.

It has been designated a Site of Community Importance. Animals that can be found include solan goose, stork, cormorant, great crested grebe, seagull, flamingo, tern, sea eagle and avocet. The park is a Special Protection Area (Zona de Especial Protección para las Aves, ZEPA)

== Gallery ==
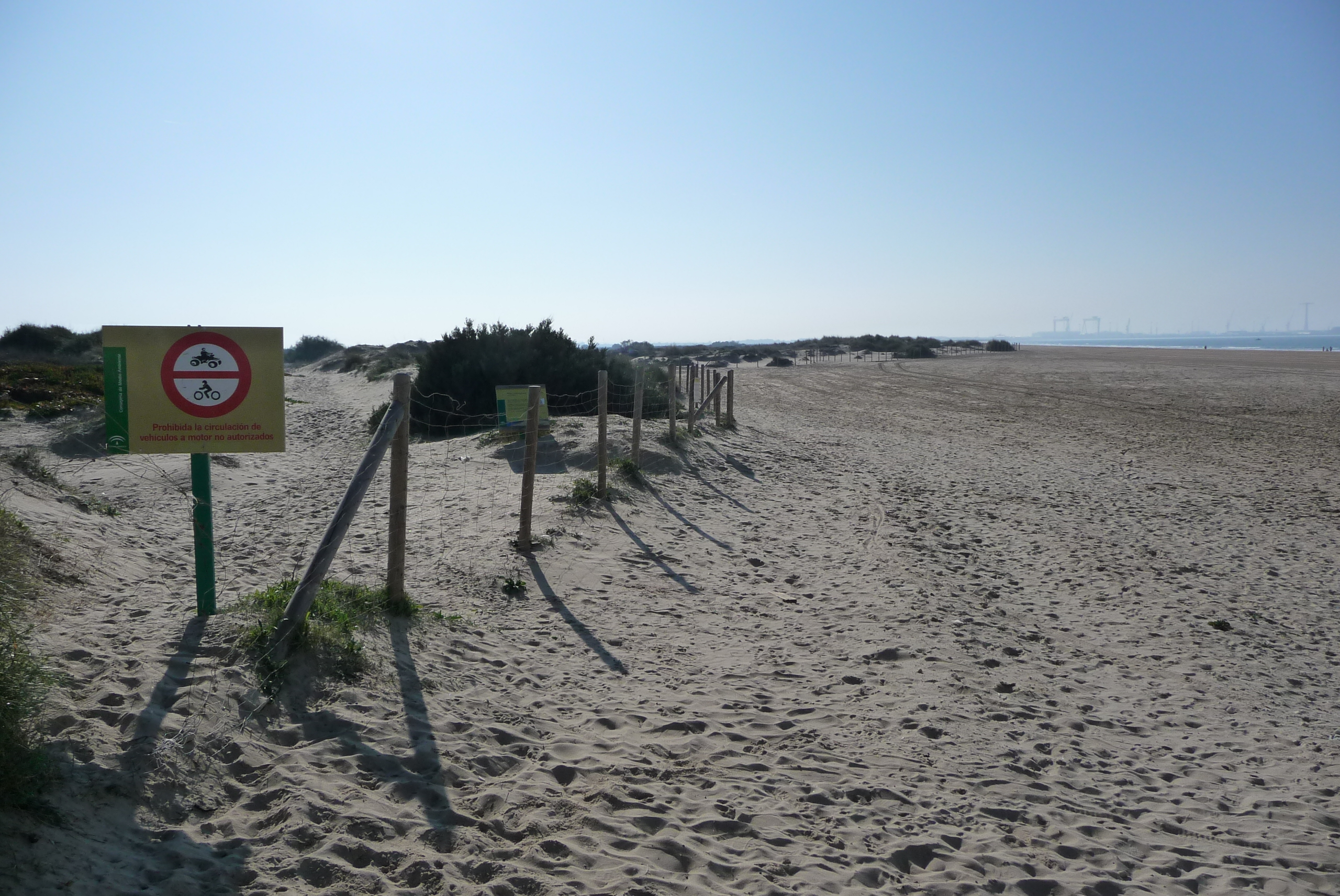
Valdelagrana

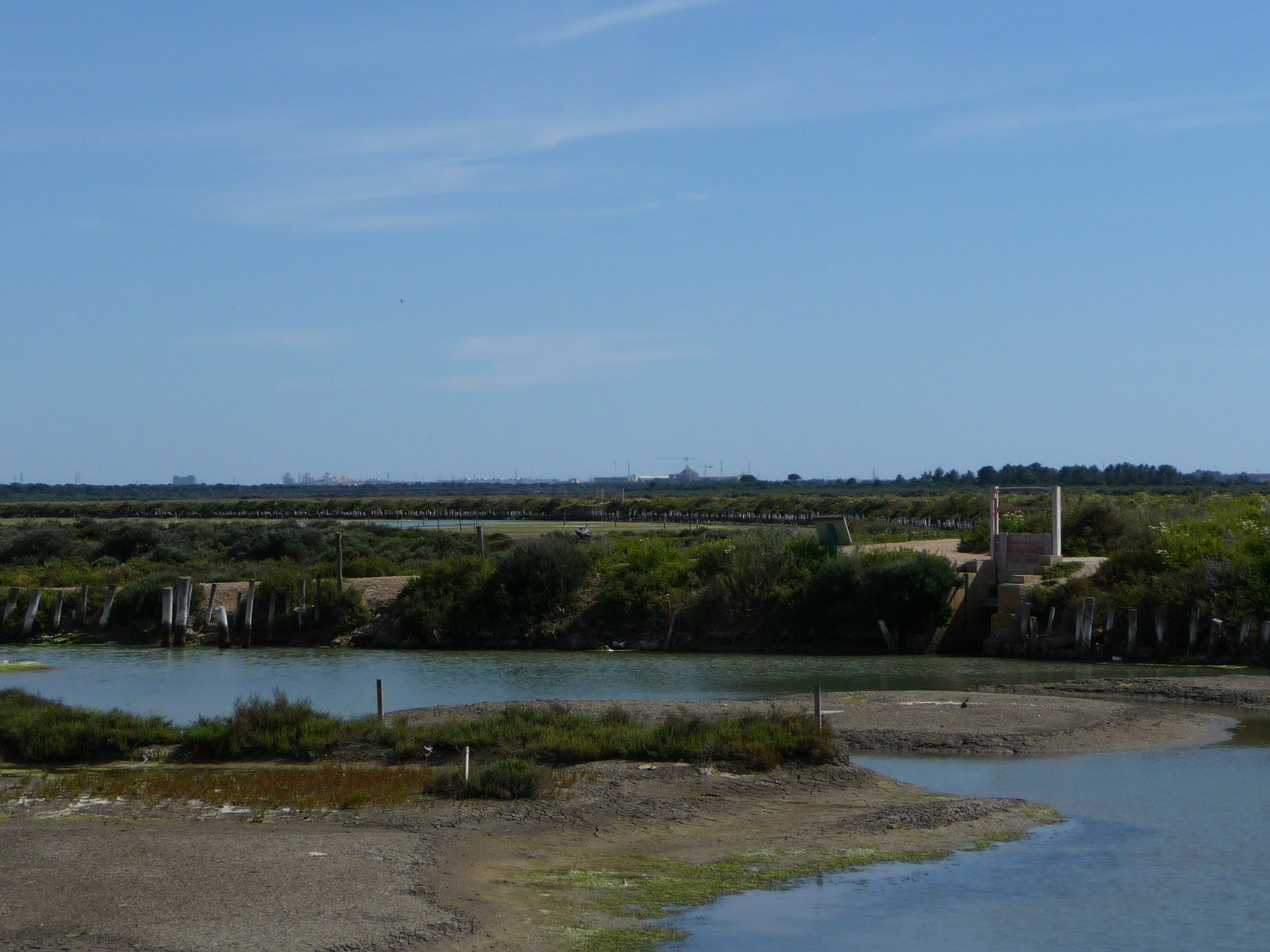
Salt traps

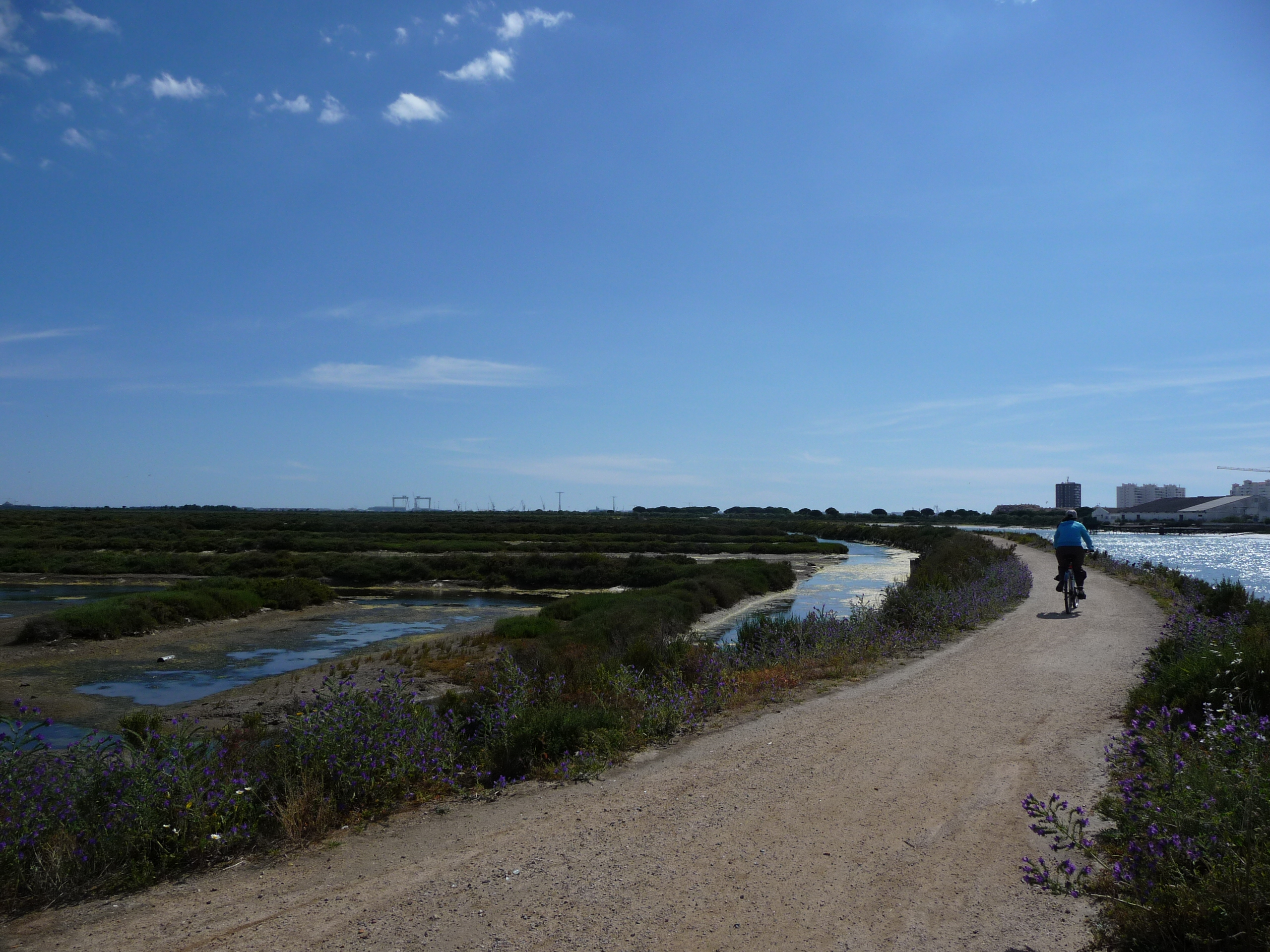
Biking

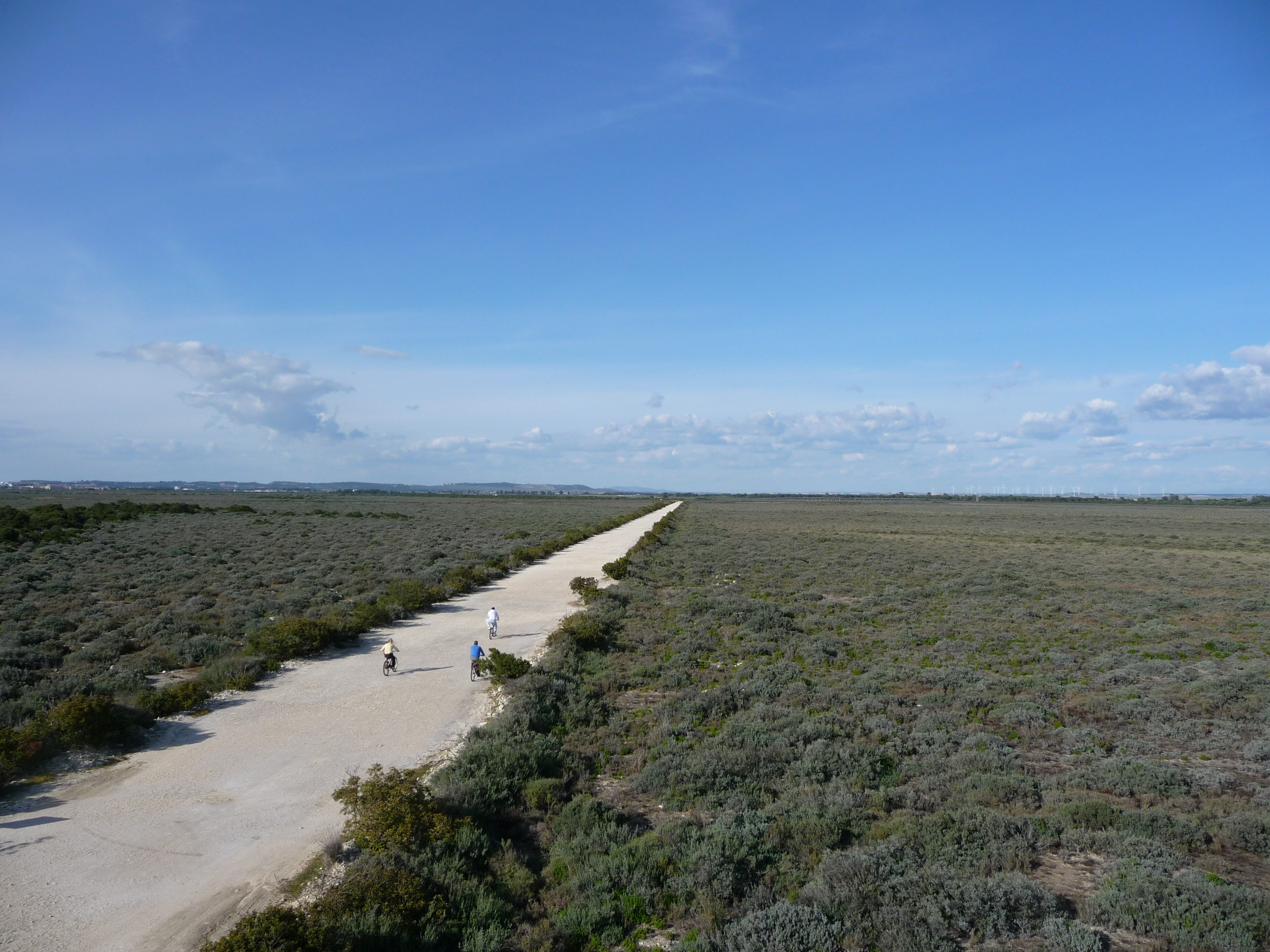
Los Toruños
