= Batería de San Melitón de la Calavera =

Coordinates: 36°25′11″N 6°13′13″W

Batería de San Melitón de la Calavera is a former defensive stronghold located near the beach of Camposoto at the southern end of the town of San Fernando in the Province of Cádiz, Andalusia, Spain. This battery was used to protect the Isla de Leon during the Siege of Cádiz and was part of the defense line of the Castle of Sancti Petri. It is 2 kilometers from the Batería de Aspiroz.
