= Batería de Urrutia =

Battery located in San Fernando in the Province of Cádiz, Andalusia, Spain

Coordinates: 36°23′56″N 6°12′44″W

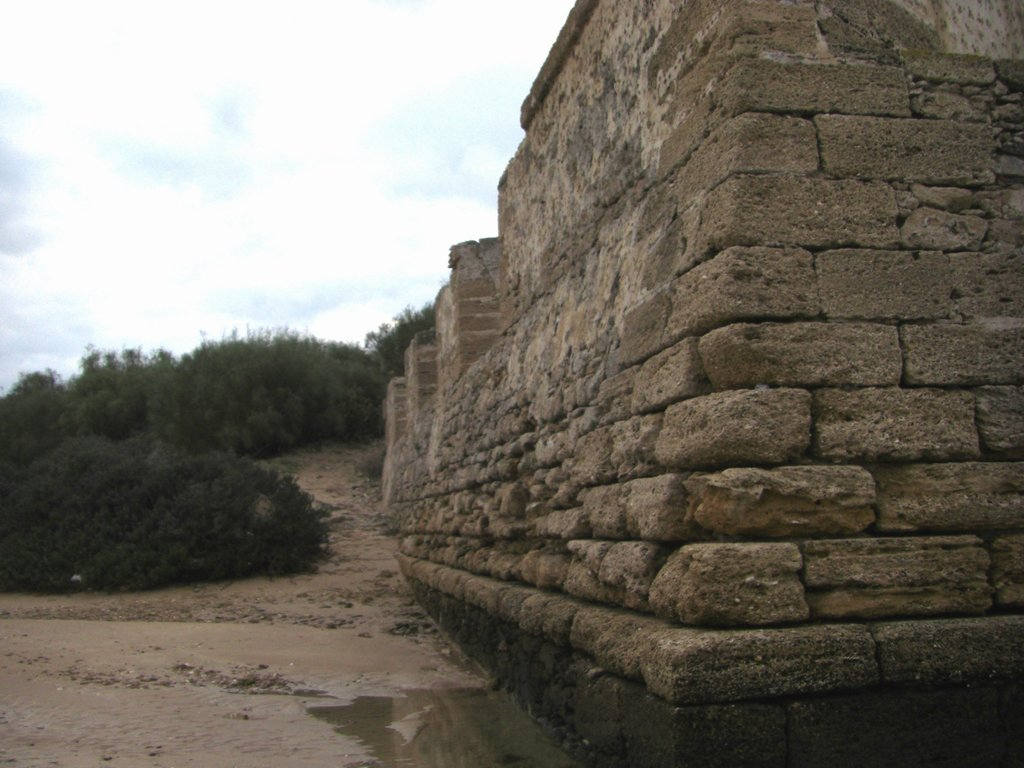
Batería Urrutia.

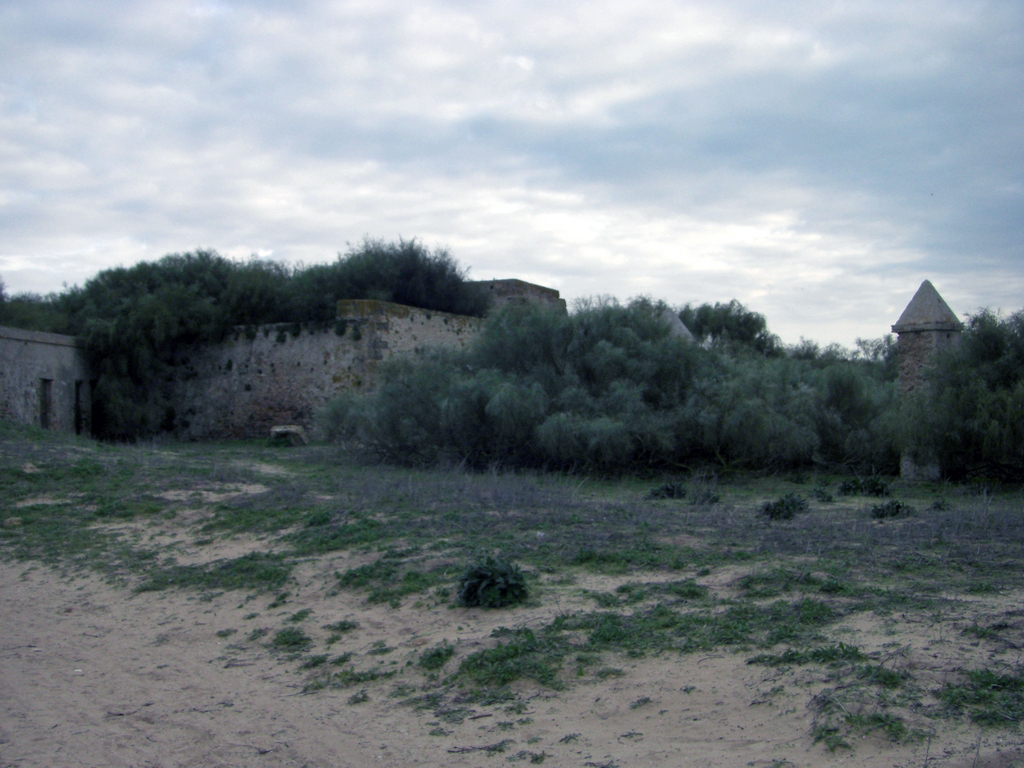
Batería Urrutia.

Batería de Urrutia is a battery located in San Fernando in the Province of Cádiz, Andalusia, Spain. It is part of the whole defensive system of bastions and batteries that protected the southern entrance of Islote de Sancti Petri in the early nineteenth century along with the Castillo de Sancti Petri and two batteries, Batería de Aspiroz and Batería de San Genís. It was protected under the general declaration of the Decree of April 22 of 1949 and Law 16/1985 by the Patrimonio Histórico Españo (Spanish Historical Heritage).
