= Batería de San Genís =

Coordinates: 36°23′40″N 6°12′50″W

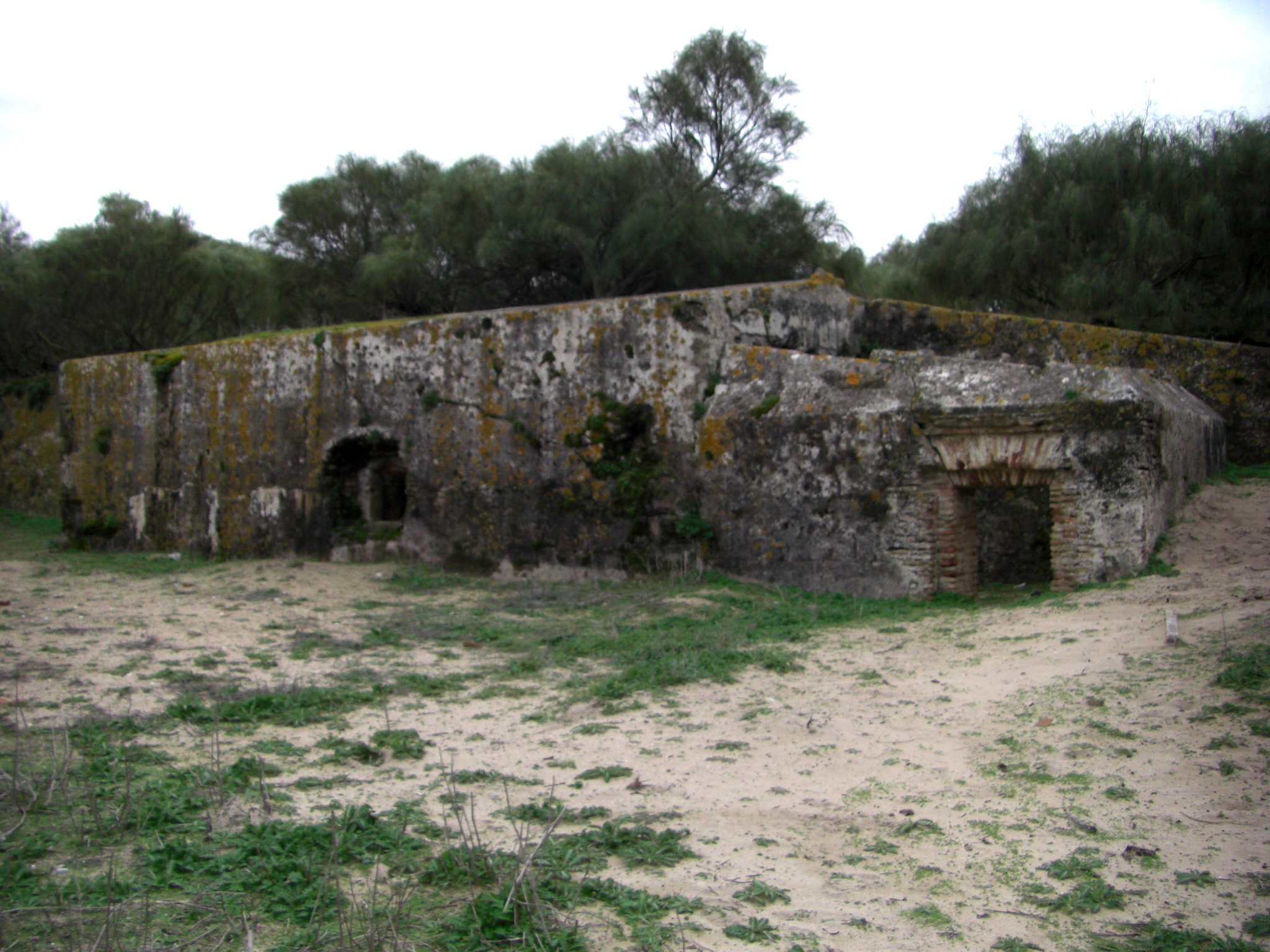
Batería de San Genís

Batería de San Genís is a battery located in San Fernando in the Province of Cádiz, Andalusia, Spain. It is part of the whole defensive system of bastions and batteries that protected the southern entrance of Islote de Sancti Petri in the early nineteenth century along with the Castillo de Sancti Petri and two batteries, Batería de Aspiroz and Batería de Urrutia. It was named after Sangenís Antonio Torre, and was capable of holding 35 pieces of artillery. It was protected under the general declaration of the Decree of April 22 of 1949 and Law 16/1985 by the Patrimonio Histórico Españo (Spanish Historical Heritage).
