= Playa de Camposoto =

Beach in Cádiz, Spain

Coordinates: 36°25′51″N 6°13′54″W

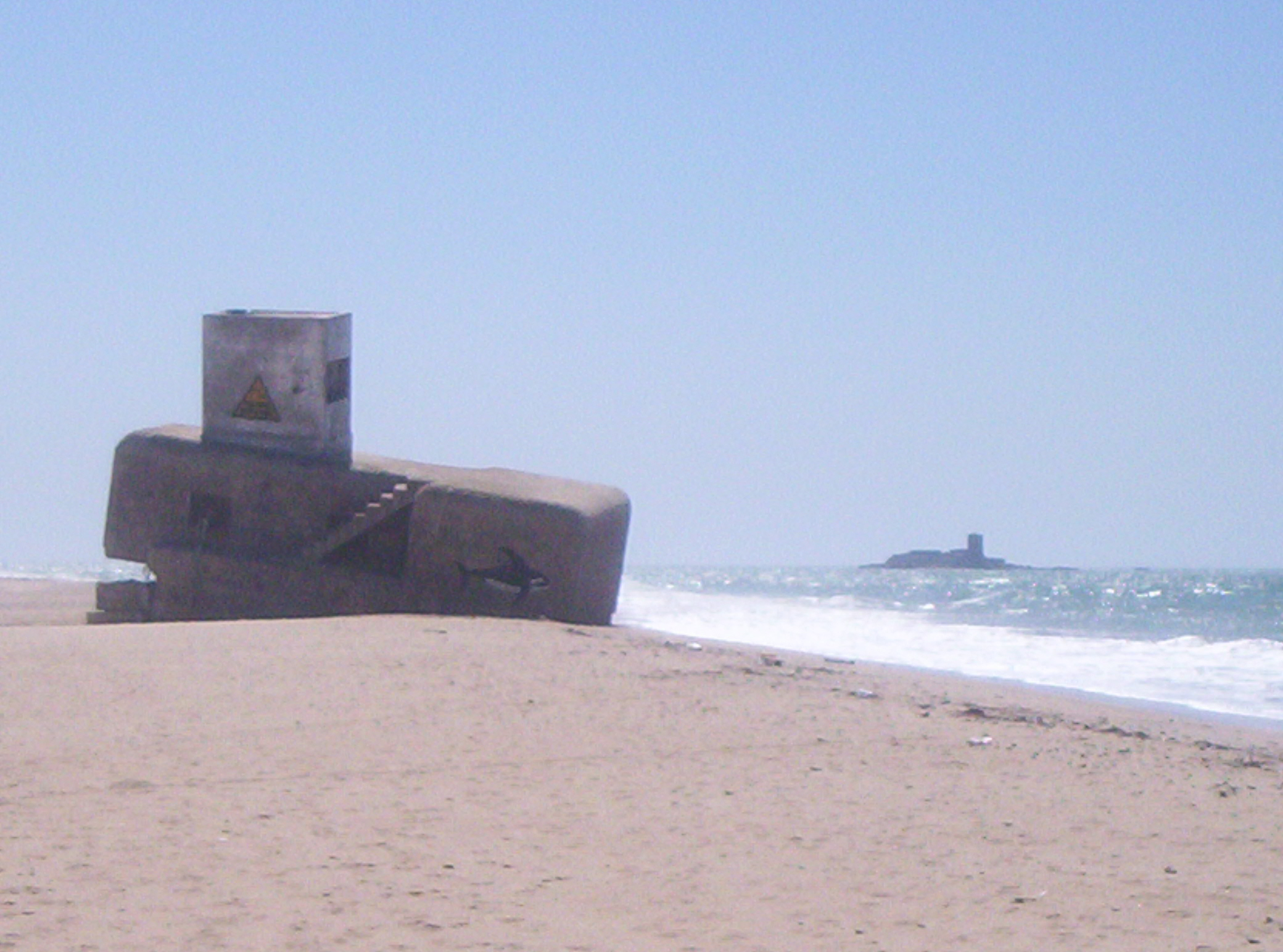

Playa de Camposoto is one of the longest beaches in southern Spain, located in the Province of Cadiz. It looks across to the Islote de Sancti Petri and is located to the north of Playa de la Barrosa. It contains Búnker 1 de Camposoto and Búnker 2 de Camposoto, bunkers from the war.
