= Batería de Aspiroz =

Battery in San Fernando, Spain

Coordinates: 36°24′4″N 6°12′44″W

Batería de Aspiroz is a battery located in San Fernando in the Province of Cádiz, Andalusia, Spain. It is a small defensive fortification that was used during the Siege of Cádiz, and is part of the whole defensive system of bastions and batteries that protected the southern entrance of Islote de Sancti Petri in the early nineteenth century along with the Castillo de Sancti Petri and two batteries, Batería de Urrutia and Batería de San Genís. Since it is located further north than the other fortifications, it is more open to the sea, and its size and armament was much lower. It was protected under the general declaration of the Decree of April 22 of 1949 and Law 16/1985 by the Patrimonio Histórico Españo (Spanish Historical Heritage).
