= Bay of Cádiz =

Coordinates: 36°29′39″N 6°13′01″W

Bay of Cádiz Bahía de Cádiz
- Bay
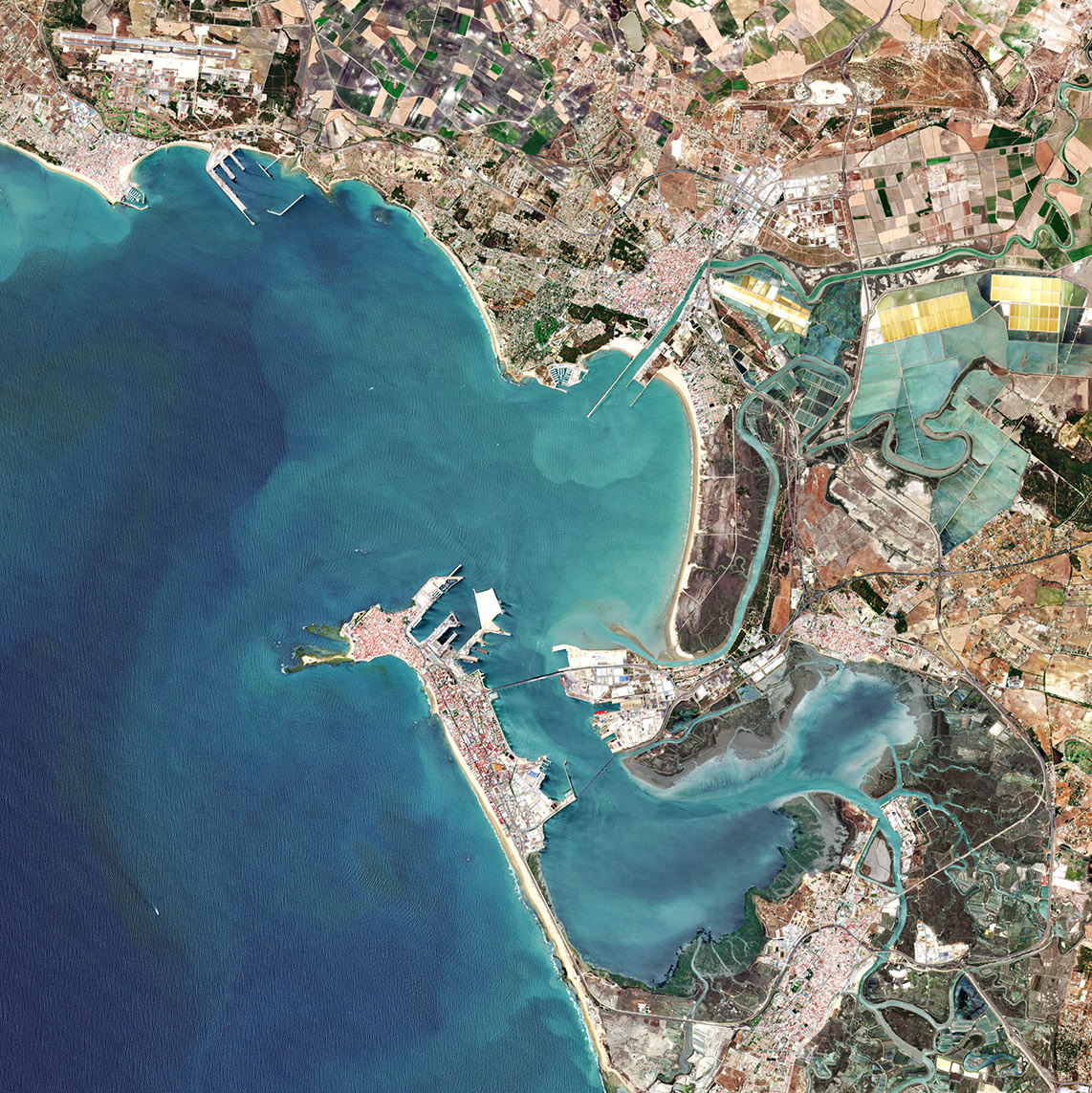
- Interactive map of Bay of Cádiz
- Country: Spain
- Region: Andalusia

Area
  - Total: 111 km^{2} (43 sq mi)

Designations

Ramsar Wetland
- Official name: Bahía de Cádiz
- Designated: 24 October 2002
- Reference no.: 1265

The Bay of Cádiz is a body of water in the province of Cádiz, Spain, adjacent to the southwestern coast of the Iberian Peninsula.

The Bay of Cádiz adjoins the Gulf of Cádiz, a larger body of water which is in the same area but further offshore.

== Geography ==
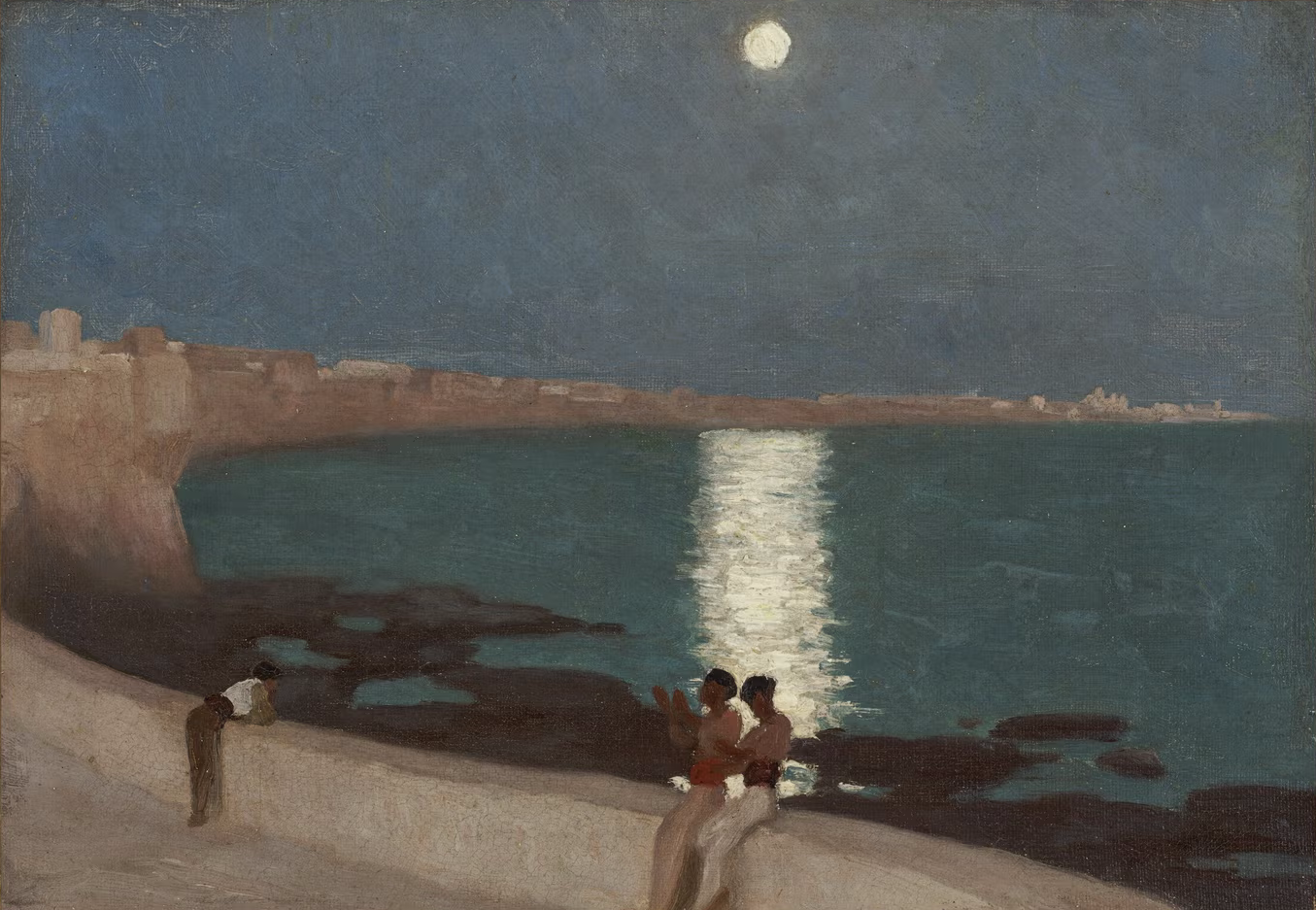
The Bay of Cadiz - Moonlight, Frederic Leighton, 1866

The shores of the Bay of Cádiz include the municipalities of Cádiz, San Fernando, Puerto Real, El Puerto de Santa María, and Rota.

The bay forms a natural harbour which according to available archaeological evidence has been inhabited since very ancient times. The Bahía de Cádiz Natural Park is located on the shores of the Bay of Cádiz.

There is also a comarca with the name Bay of Cádiz.

== See also ==
- Gulf of Cádiz
- List of Ramsar sites in Spain
- List of Sites of Community Importance in Andalusia
- Temple of Hercules Gaditanus
