= Temple of Hercules Gaditanus =

Ancient temple in Cádiz, Spain

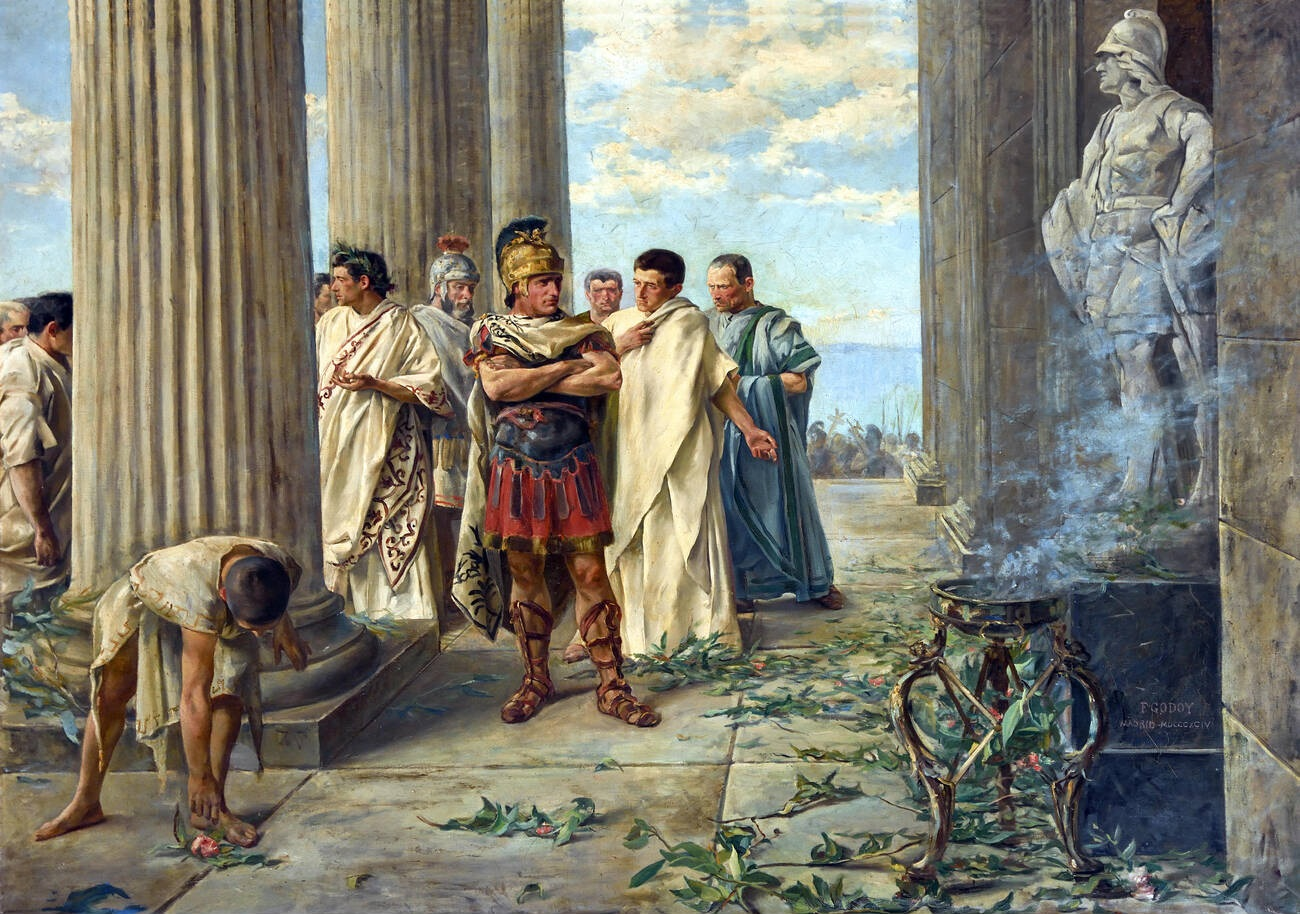
Julius Caesar visiting the Temple of Hercules Gaditano.

The Temple of Hercules Gaditanus, Temple of Melqart or Temple of Hercules-Melqart was a place of worship in Antiquity in the southern outskirts of Gadir-Gades (current-day Cádiz), perhaps dating as early as the 8th century BC. Operating under Tyrian, Carthaginian and Roman rule, it once was one of the most important sanctuaries in the Western World. It was paid respect by the likes of Hannibal, Scipio Africanus and Caesar.

It was initially dedicated to the Phoenician god Melqart and then to Hercules.

== History ==
In the 1st century BC, Strabo mentioned in his Geographica that the Tyrians founded Gadeira, erecting a sanctuary to Melkart, whom the Greeks and Romans identified with Hercules, on the eastern part of the island, while the city was established on the western part. It was said that the temple had been founded around eighty years after the Trojan War, at the beginning of the 12th century BC.

The sanctuary was likely a complex of buildings where the main structure could be accessed through a gateway flanked by two large columns. Strabo notes that the two bronze pillars within the temple, each eight cubits high, were widely proclaimed to be the true Pillars of Hercules by many who had visited the place and had sacrificed to Heracles there. But Strabo believes the account to be fraudulent, in part noting that the inscriptions on those pillars mentioned nothing about Heracles, speaking only of the expenses incurred by the Phoenicians in their making. As described by Silius Italicus in the 1st century BC, the facade featured the twelve labors of Hercules, intricately crafted in bronze. Inside the precinct, there was no representation or statue of the deity. Additionally, it is noted that human sacrifices were forbidden. A perpetual flame burned on its altar, continuously overseen by the watchful presence of its priests. According to Strabo, sailors made their sacrifices on the columns at the entrance of the sanctuary. The sanctuary was adorned with numerous bronze altars depicting scenes from Hercules' life, on which fires constantly burned. Furthermore, the sanctuary was renowned for its two freshwater wells, which had a unique ebbing and flowing pattern, opposite to the tides.

According to the Latin historian Pomponius Mela, the temple housed the remains of Hercules, contributing to its immense fame. Moreover, the temple held renowned relics such as the belt of Teucer, a Greek hero and son of Telamon, and the tree of Pygmalion, whose fruits were said to be emeralds.

Classical historical sources recount that many renowned individuals, distinguished by their deeds or nobility, visited this temple. Titus Livius narrates that Hannibal arrived at the island to offer his vows to the god before embarking on the conquest of Italy. In this sanctuary, Julius Caesar experienced a prophetic dream that foretold his dominion over the world. This revelation came after he had wept in front of the bust of Alexander the Great, feeling despondent that he had reached the same age without achieving significant success.

== Location ==
Using LiDAR technology, different research group have pinpointed its specific location to either an underwater location in the estuarine marsh of Sancti Petri or to the cerro de los Mártires (300 metres inland), sparking a controversy pitting groups linked to the University of Seville and the Instituto Andaluz del Patrimonio Histórico against other research groups linked to the Universities of Cádiz and Córdoba. The University of Seville researchers examined the contours of earth in the coastal area of Sancti Petri Channel and found a 984 feet long and 492 feet wide structure.
