= Búnker 1 de Camposoto =

Historic bunker in San Fernando, Spain

Coordinates: 36°23′41″N 6°13′4″W

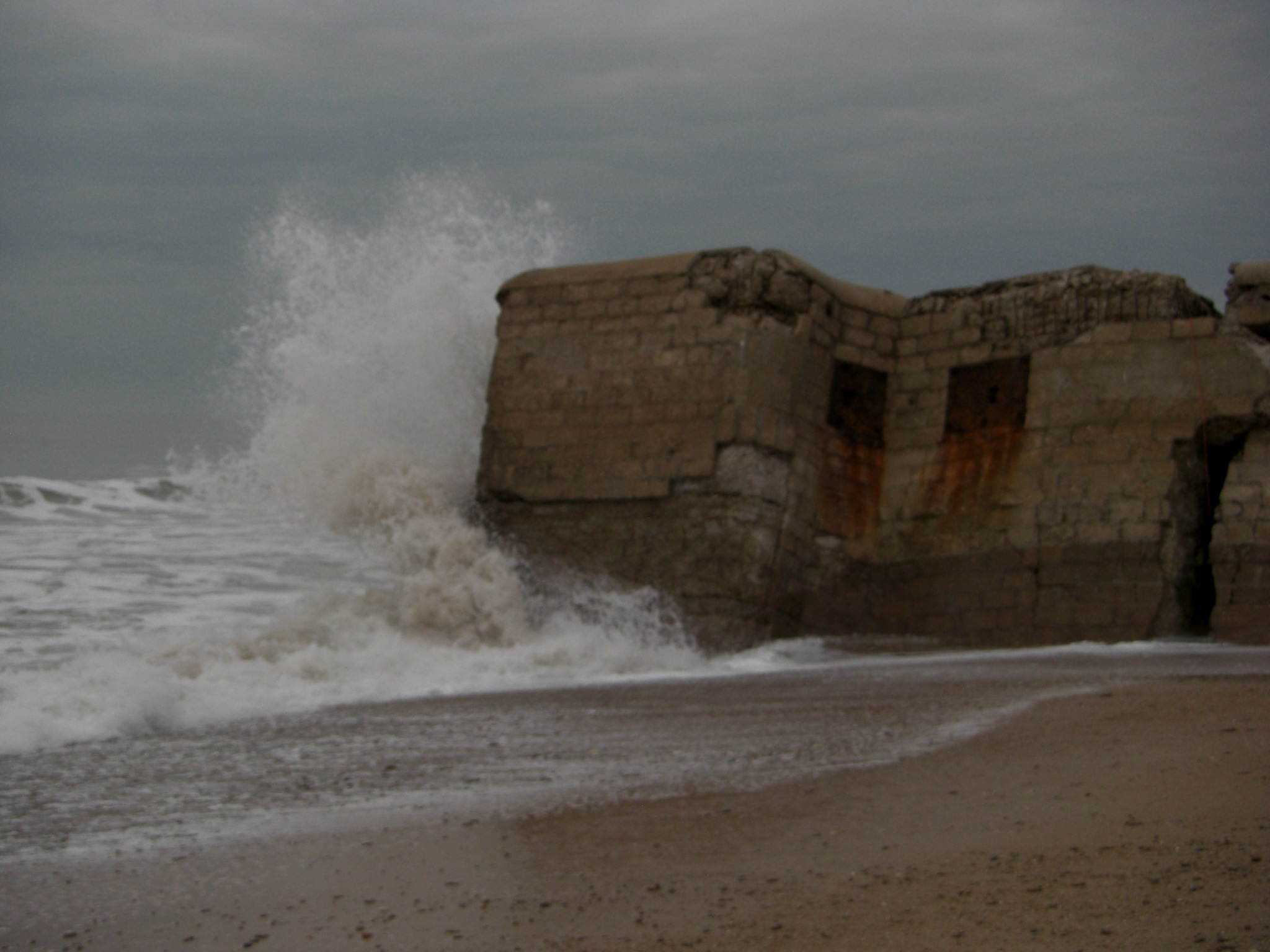

Búnker 1 de Camposoto is a bunker located in San Fernando in the Province of Cádiz, Andalusia, Spain. It was built on Camposoto beach during the Spanish Civil War.
