= Pillars of Hercules =

Phrase used in antiquity to label the promontories of the Strait of Gibraltar

Coordinates: 36°07′46″N 5°20′40″W

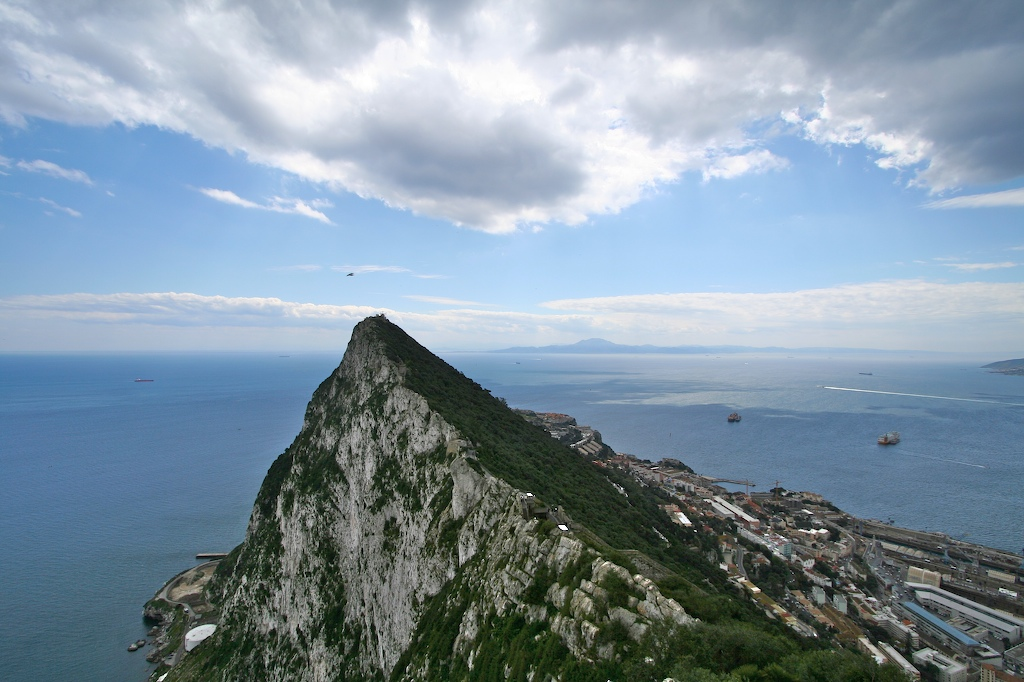
The European Pillar of Hercules: the Rock of Gibraltar, with the Moroccan shore and Jebel Musa in the background

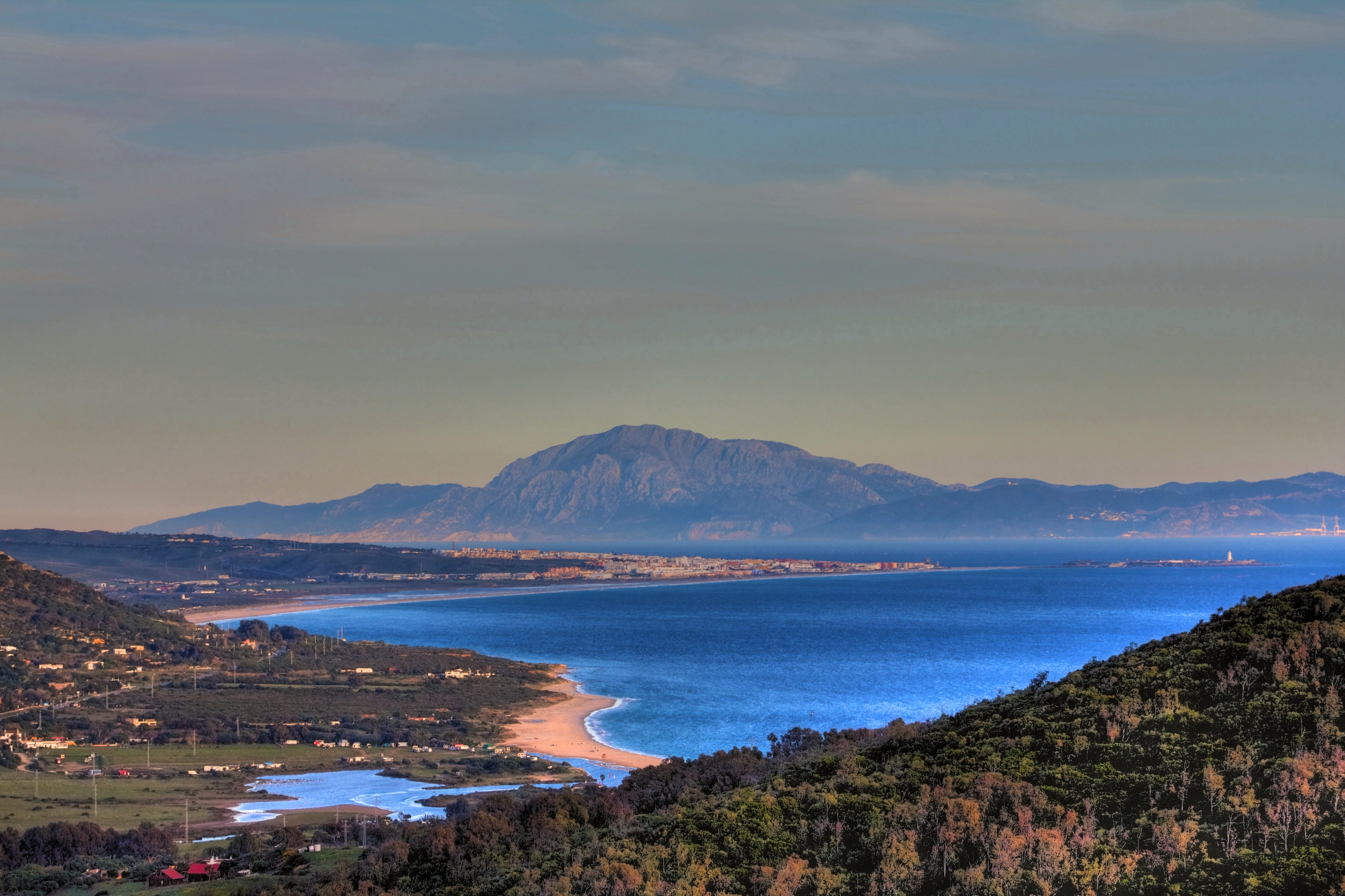
Jebel Musa, one of the candidates for the North African Pillar of Hercules, as seen from Tarifa, at the other shore of the Strait of Gibraltar.

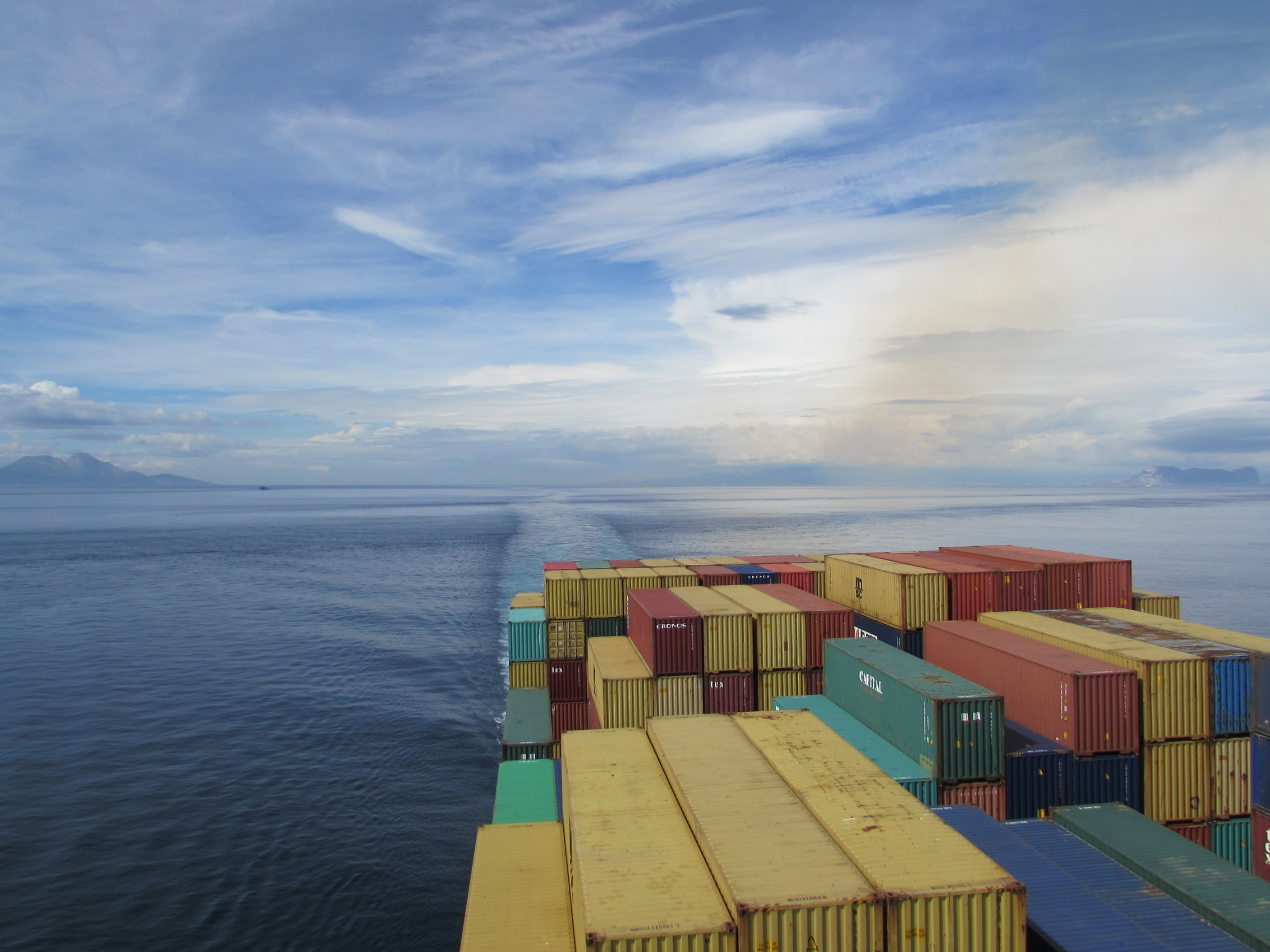
Jebel Musa and the Rock of Gibraltar seen from the Mediterranean Sea

The Pillars of Hercules (Note: Latin: Columnae Herculis; Ancient Greek: Ἡράκλειαι Στῆλαι, romanized: Hērákleiai Stêlai; Arabic: أعمدة هرقل, romanized: Aʿmidat Hiraql; Spanish: Columnas de Hércules) are the promontories that flank the entrance to the Strait of Gibraltar. The northern Pillar, Calpe Mons, is the Rock of Gibraltar. The identity of the corresponding southern Pillar, Abila Mons, has been disputed throughout history, with the two most likely candidates being Jebel Musa and Monte Hacho. The term was applied in antiquity: Pliny the Elder included the Pillars of Hercules in his Naturalis historia (Book III:3).

== History ==
According to Greek mythology adopted by the Etruscans and the Romans, when Hercules had to perform twelve labours, one of them (the tenth) was to fetch the Cattle of Geryon of the far West and bring them to Eurystheus; this marked the westward extent of his travels. A lost passage of Pindar quoted by Strabo was the earliest traceable reference in this context: "the pillars which Pindar calls the 'gates of Gades' when he asserts that they are the farthermost limits reached by Heracles". Since there has been a one-to-one association between Heracles and Melqart since Herodotus, the "Pillars of Melqart" in the temple near Gades/Gádeira (modern Cádiz) have sometimes been considered to be the true Pillars of Hercules.

Plato placed the legendary island of Atlantis beyond the "Pillars of Hercules". Renaissance tradition says the pillars bore the warning Ne plus ultra (also Non plus ultra, "nothing further beyond"), serving as a warning to sailors and navigators to go no further.

According to some Roman sources, while on his way to the garden of the Hesperides on the island of Erytheia, Hercules had to cross the mountain that was once Atlas. Instead of climbing the great mountain, Hercules used his superhuman strength to smash through it. By doing so, he connected the Atlantic Ocean to the Mediterranean Sea and formed the Strait of Gibraltar. One part of the split mountain is Gibraltar and the other is either Jebel Musa or Monte Hacho. These two mountains taken together have since then been known as the Pillars of Hercules, although other natural features have been associated with the name.

Diodorus Siculus, however, held that, instead of smashing through an isthmus to create the Straits of Gibraltar, Hercules "narrowed" an already existing strait to prevent monsters from the Atlantic Ocean from entering the Mediterranean Sea.

In some versions, Heracles instead built the two to hold the sky away from the earth, liberating Atlas from his damnation.

=== Phoenician connection ===
Beyond Gades, several important Mauretanian colonies (in northern Morocco) were founded by the Phoenicians as the Phoenician merchant fleet pushed through the Pillars of Hercules and began constructing a series of bases along the Atlantic coast, starting with Lixus (modern Larache), then Chellah (modern Rabat), and, finally, Mogador (modern Essaouira).

Near the eastern shore of the island of Gades/Gadeira (modern Cádiz, just beyond the Gibraltar strait) Strabo describes the westernmost temple of Tyrian Heracles, the god with whom Greeks associated the Phoenician and Punic Melqart, by interpretatio graeca. Strabo notes that the two bronze pillars within the temple, each eight cubits high, were widely proclaimed to be the true Pillars of Hercules by many who had visited the place and had sacrificed to Heracles there. But Strabo believes the account to be fraudulent, in part noting that the inscriptions on those pillars mentioned nothing about Heracles, speaking only of the expenses incurred by the Phoenicians in their making. The columns of the Melqart temple at Tyre were also of religious significance.

=== The Pillars in Syriac geography ===
Syriac scholars were aware of the Pillars through their efforts to translate Greek scientific works into their language, as well as into Arabic. The Syriac compendium of knowledge known as Ktaba d'ellat koll 'ellan (Cause of All Causes) is unusual in asserting that there were three, not two, columns.

== In art ==
=== Dante's Inferno ===
In Inferno XXVI Dante Alighieri mentions Ulysses in the pit of the Fraudulent Counsellors and his voyage past the Pillars of Hercules. Ulysses justifies endangering his sailors by the fact that his goal is to gain knowledge of the unknown. After five months of ocean navigation, Ulysses sights the mountain of Purgatory but encounters a whirlwind from it that sinks his ship and all on it for their daring to approach Purgatory while alive, by their strength and wits alone.

=== Sir Francis Bacon's Novum Organum ===
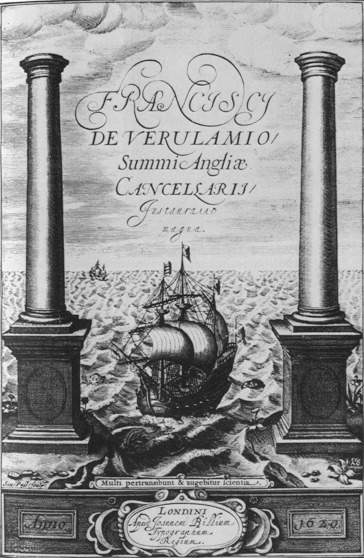
The title page of Sir Francis Bacon's Instauratio Magna, 1620

The Pillars appear prominently on the engraved title page of Sir Francis Bacon's Instauratio Magna ("Great Renewal"), 1620, an unfinished work of which the second part was his influential Novum Organum. The motto along the base says Multi pertransibunt et augebitur scientia ("Many will pass through and knowledge will be the greater"). The image was based on the use of the pillars in Spanish and Habsburg propaganda.

=== Statue of the pillars of Hercules in Ceuta ===
The Spanish exclave of Ceuta, bordering Morocco, is home to a modern-day statue called "The Pillars of Hercules" (Spanish: Columnas de Hércules).

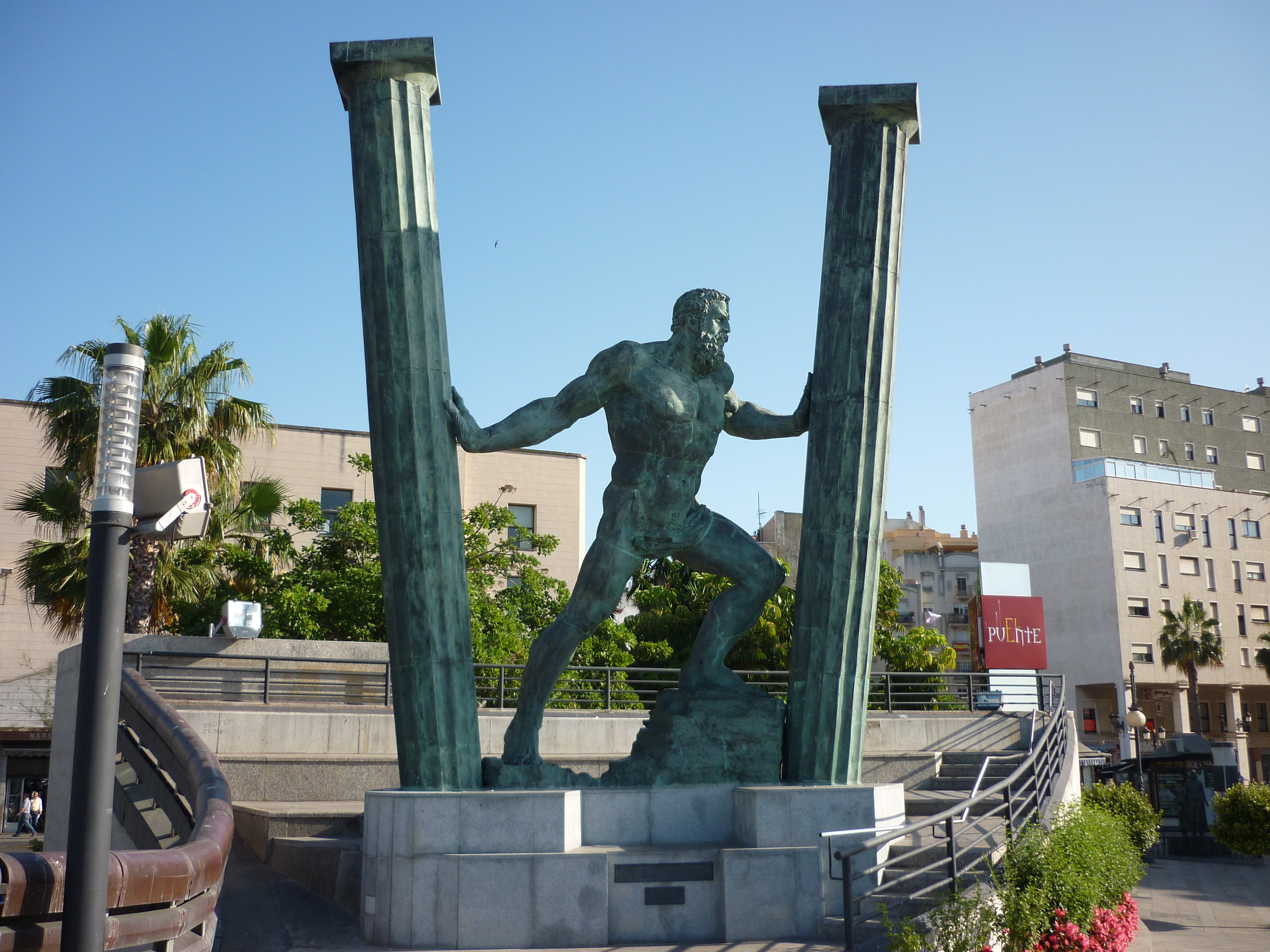
The statue of the Pillars of Hercules in Ceuta

The statue consists of two large bronze pillars, which are pushed apart by Hercules. The statue was made by Ceuta artist Ginés Serrán-Pagán.

=== In architecture ===
On the Spanish coast at Los Barrios are Torres de Hercules which are twin towers that were inspired by the Pillars of Hercules. These towers were the tallest in Andalusia until Cajasol Tower was completed in Seville in 2015.

In the southern wall of the National Autonomous University of Mexico's Central Library, the mural Historical Representation of Culture, created by the artist Juan O'Gorman, portrays a depiction of the Pillars of Hercules as an allusion to the colonial past of Mexico and the house of Charles V.

== Coat of arms ==
The Pillars appear as supporters of the coat of arms of Spain, originating in the impresa of Spain's sixteenth-century Charles I, whose regnal name as Holy Roman Emperor was Charles V. An idea of the Italian humanist Luigi Marliano, it bears the motto Plus Ultra, Latin for "further beyond", implying the pillars were a gateway to more. This was modified from the phrase Nec plus ultra ("Nothing more beyond") after the discovery of the Americas, as the event laid to rest the ancient idea of the Pillars as the westernmost extremity of the inhabitable world.

The columns as depicted in the Spanish coat of arms

Coat of arms of Spain

Emblem of Andalusia

Coat of arms of Extremadura

Coat of arms of Melilla

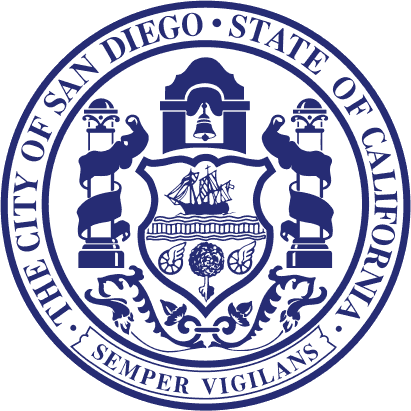
Seal of San Diego, California

Coat of arms of Veracruz, Mexico

Coat of arms of Tabasco, Mexico

Coat of arms of Trujillo, Peru

Coat of arms of Potosí, Bolivia

Coat of arms of Cádiz

Coat of arms of Tumbes, Peru

== Gallery ==
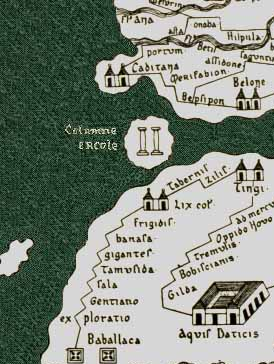
Modern conjectural depiction of the lost western section of the Tabula Peutingeriana, showing a representation of the Pillars of Hercules (Columne Ercole)

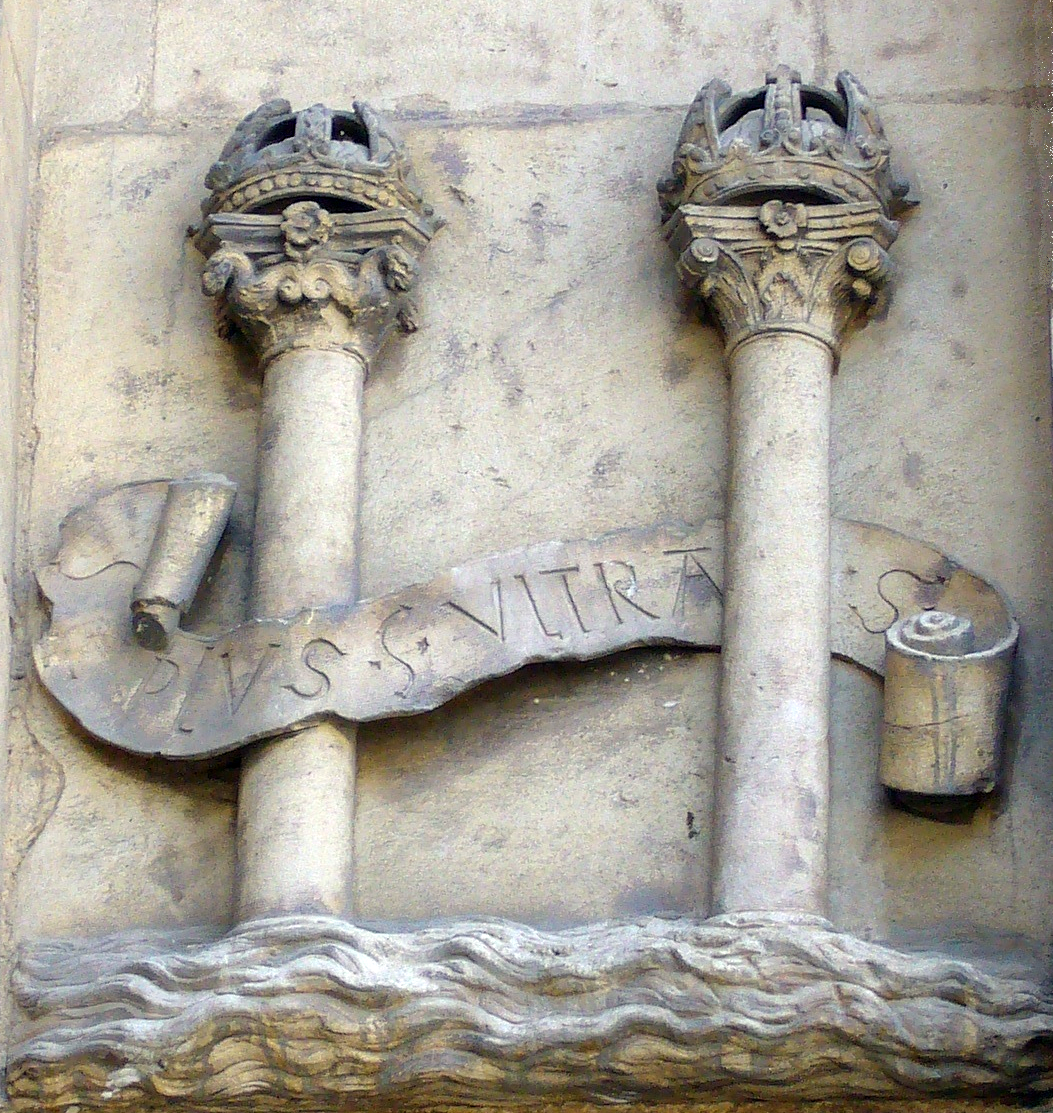
Device of Charles V in Seville's city hall

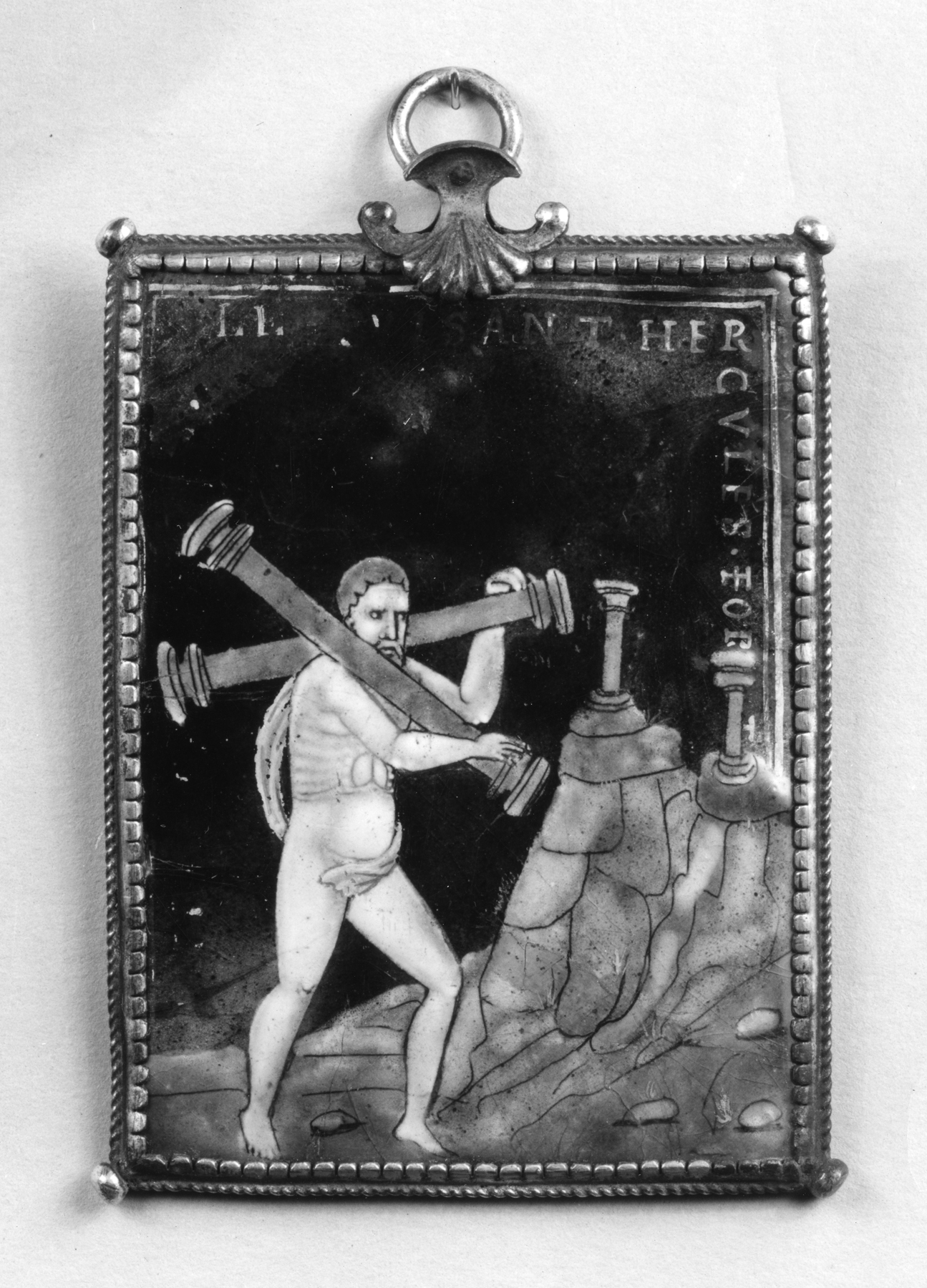
Limoges enamel depicting Hercules carrying the two columns, by Couly Nouailher, mid-16th century (Walters Art Museum)

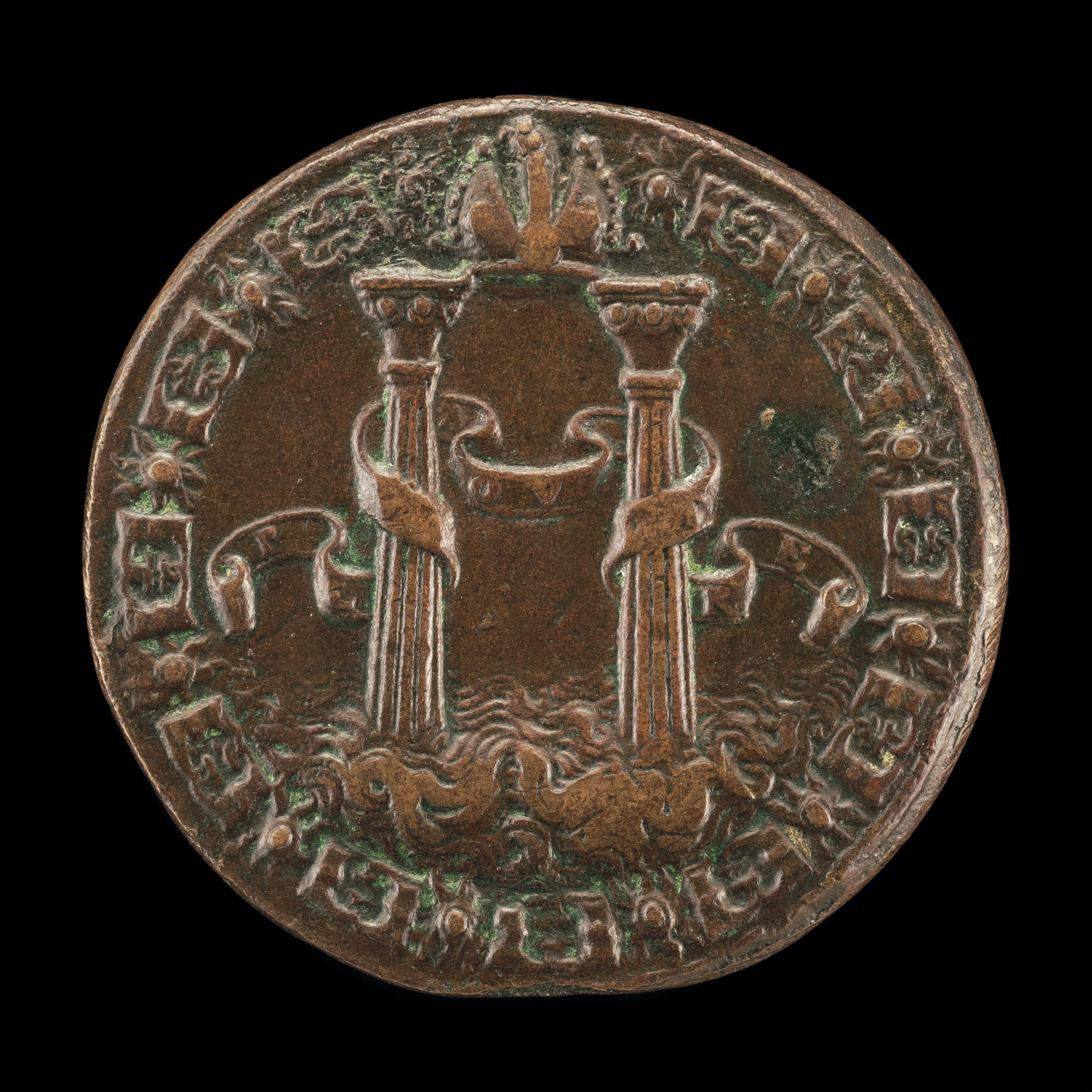
Leone Leoni. The Pillars of Hercules [reverse]. Bronze, 1553. 4.2 cm. National Gallery of Art, Washington. Gift of Lisa and Leonard Baskin.

== See also ==
- Caves of Hercules
- Dollar sign
