= Búnker 2 de Camposoto =

Historic bunker in San Fernando, Spain

Coordinates: 36°23′56″N 6°13′3″W

Búnker 2 de Camposoto is a bunker located in San Fernando in the Province of Cádiz, Andalusia, Spain.
