= Melqart =

Major deity in the Phoenician and Punic pantheons

- God of strength and heroes Dying-and-rising deity Patron deity of Tyre
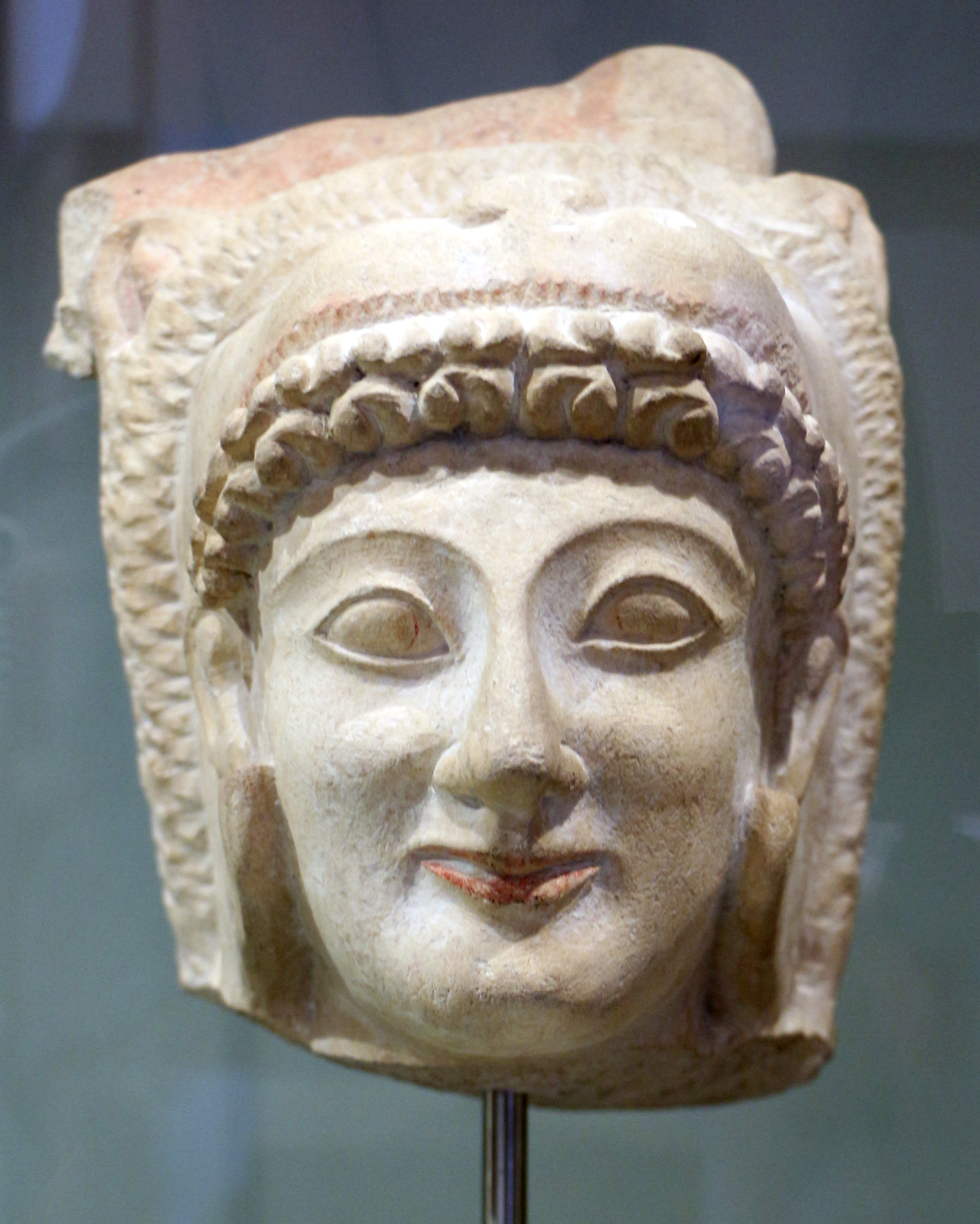
- Phoenician Melqart, 6th century BC (Barracco Museum of Antique Sculpture)
- Major cult center: Pillars of Melqart; Tyre, Phoenicia; Gadir, Iberia
- Abode: Underworld
- Symbol: Axe, lion
- Festivals: Egersis

Genealogy
- Parents: El, Baal (father); Astarte (mother)
- Siblings: paternal: Anat, Attar, Mot, Shahar, Shalim, Shapash, Yam

Equivalents
- Greek: Heracles
- Roman: Hercules

Melqart (Phoenician: 𐤌𐤋𐤒𐤓𐤕, romanized: Milqart) was the tutelary deity of the Phoenician city-state of Tyre and a major deity in the Phoenician and Punic pantheons. He may have been central to the origin myths of various Phoenician colonies throughout the Mediterranean as well as the source of several myths concerning the exploits of Heracles. Many cities were thought to be founded (in one way or another) and protected by Melqart, no doubt springing from the original Phoenician practice of building a temple of Melqart at new colonies. Similar to Dumuzid and Adonis, he symbolized an annual cycle of death and rebirth as a dying-and-rising deity.

Reflecting his dual role as both protector of the world and ruler of the underworld, he was often shown holding an ankh or lotus flower as a symbol of life, and a fenestrated axe as a symbol of death.

As Tyrian trade, colonization and settlement expanded, Melqart became venerated in Phoenician and Punic cultures across the Mediterranean, especially Carthage and Cádiz. During the high point of Phoenician civilization between 1000 and 500 BCE, Melqart was associated with other pantheons and often venerated accordingly. Most notably, he was identified with the Greek Heracles and the Roman Hercules from at least the sixth century BCE, and eventually became interchangeable with his Greek counterpart.

In Cyprus, Melqart was syncretized with Eshmun and Asclepius, and also in Ibiza, as given by a dedication reciting: "to his lord, Eshmun-Melqart".

== Etymology ==
Melqart was written in the Phoenician abjad as mlqrt (Phoenician: 𐤌𐤋𐤒𐤓𐤕). Edward Lipinski theorizes that it was derived from milk-qart, which means "king of the city". The name is sometimes transcribed as Melkart, Melkarth, or Melgart. In Akkadian, his name was written Milqartu.

To the Greeks and the Romans, who identified Melqart with Hercules, he was often distinguished as the Tyrian Hercules.

== Cult ==
Melqart was possibly the Ba‘al found in the Hebrew Bible, specifically in 1 Kings 16:31–10.26) whose worship was prominently introduced to Israel by King Ahab and largely eradicated by King Jehu. In 1 Kings 18:27, it is possible that there is a mocking reference to legendary Heraclean journeys made by the god and to the annual egersis (Ancient Greek: ἔγερσις, lit. 'awakening, resurrection') of the god: "And it came to pass at noon that Elijah mocked them and said, 'Cry out loud: for he is a god; either he is lost in thought, or he has wandered away, or he is on a journey, or perhaps he is sleeping and must be awakened.'"

The Phoenician novelist, Heliodorus of Emesa, in his Aethiopica, refers to the dancing of sailors in honor of the Tyrian Heracles: "Now they leap spiritedly into the air, now they bend their knees to the ground and revolve on them like persons possessed."

The historian Herodotus recorded (2.44):

In the wish to get the best information that I could on these matters, I made a voyage to Tyre in Phoenicia, hearing there was a temple of Heracles at that place, very highly venerated. I visited the temple, and found it richly adorned with a number of offerings, among which were two pillars, one of pure gold, the other of smaragdos, shining with great brilliance at night. In a conversation which I held with the priests, I inquired how long their temple had been built, and found by their answer that they, too, differed from the Hellenes. They said that the temple was built at the same time that the city was founded, and that the foundation of the city took place 2,300 years ago. In Tyre I remarked another temple where the same god was worshipped as the Thasian Heracles. So I went on to Thasos, where I found a temple of Heracles which had been built by the Phoenicians who colonised that island when they sailed in search of Europa. Even this was five generations earlier than the time when Heracles, son of Amphitryon, was born in Hellas. These researches show plainly that there is an ancient god Heracles; and my own opinion is that those Hellenes act most wisely who build and maintain two temples of Heracles, in the one of which the Heracles worshipped is known by the name of Olympian, and has sacrifice offered to him as an immortal, while in the other the honours paid are such as are due to a hero.

Josephus records (Antiquities of the Jews 8.5.3), following Menander of Ephesus the historian, concerning King Hiram I of Tyre (c. 965–935 BCE):

He also went and cut down materials of timber out of the mountain called Lebanon, for the roof of temples; and when he had pulled down the ancient temples, he both built the temple of Heracles and that of `Ashtart; and he was the first to celebrate the awakening (egersis) of Heracles in the month Peritius.

The annual celebration of the revival of Melqart's "awakening" may identify Melqart as a dying-and-rising god.

Melqart played the central role in the Phoenician spring festival during which he died and was resurrected.

The Roman Emperor Septimius Severus was a native of Lepcis Magna in Africa, an originally Phoenician city where worship of Melqart was widespread. He is known to have constructed in Rome a temple dedicated to "Liber and Hercules," and it is assumed that the Emperor, seeking to honour the god of his native city, identified Melqart with the Roman god Liber.

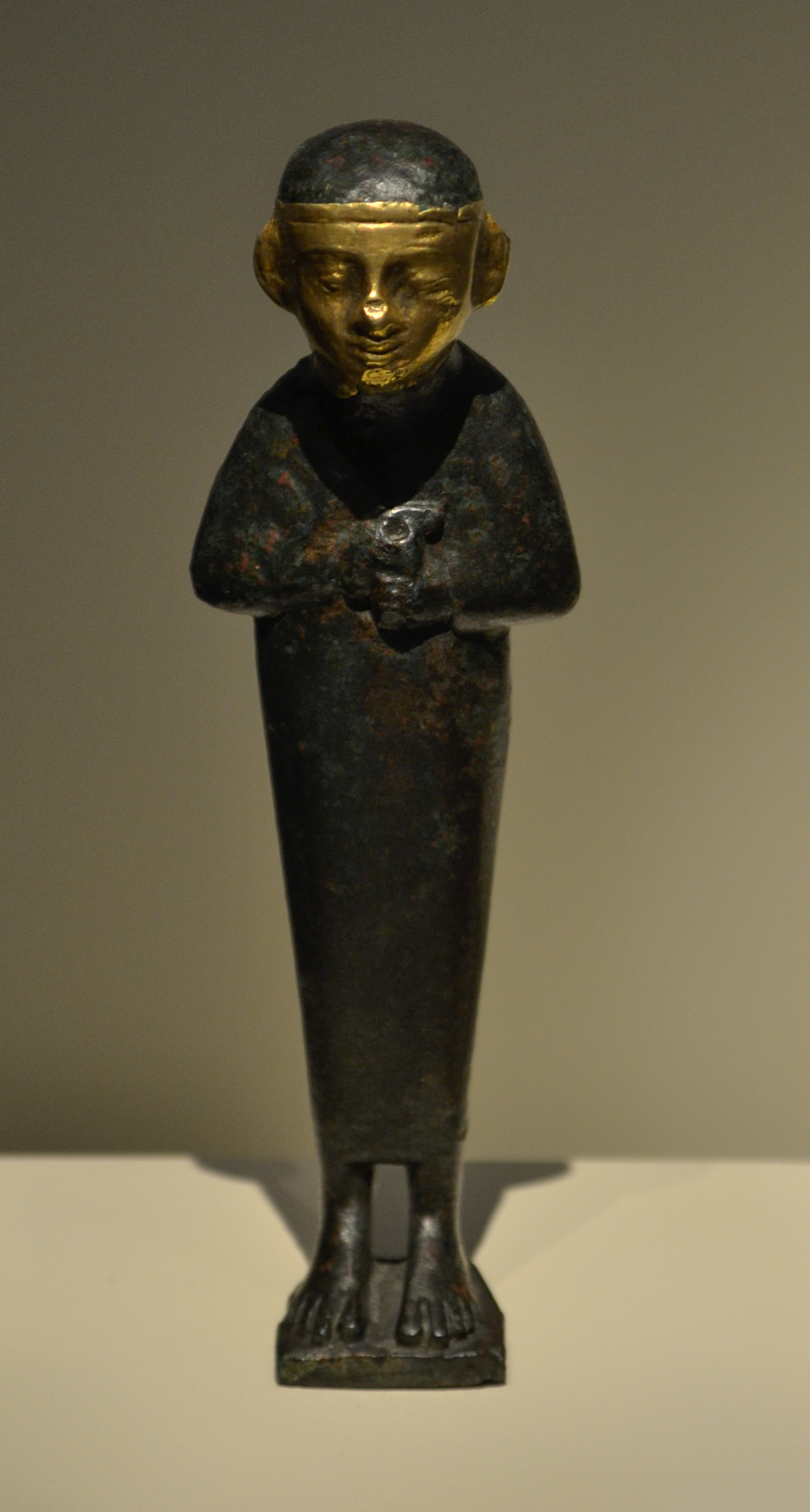
Bronze statuette of a priest of Melqart, 7th century BC National Archaeological Museum Madrid

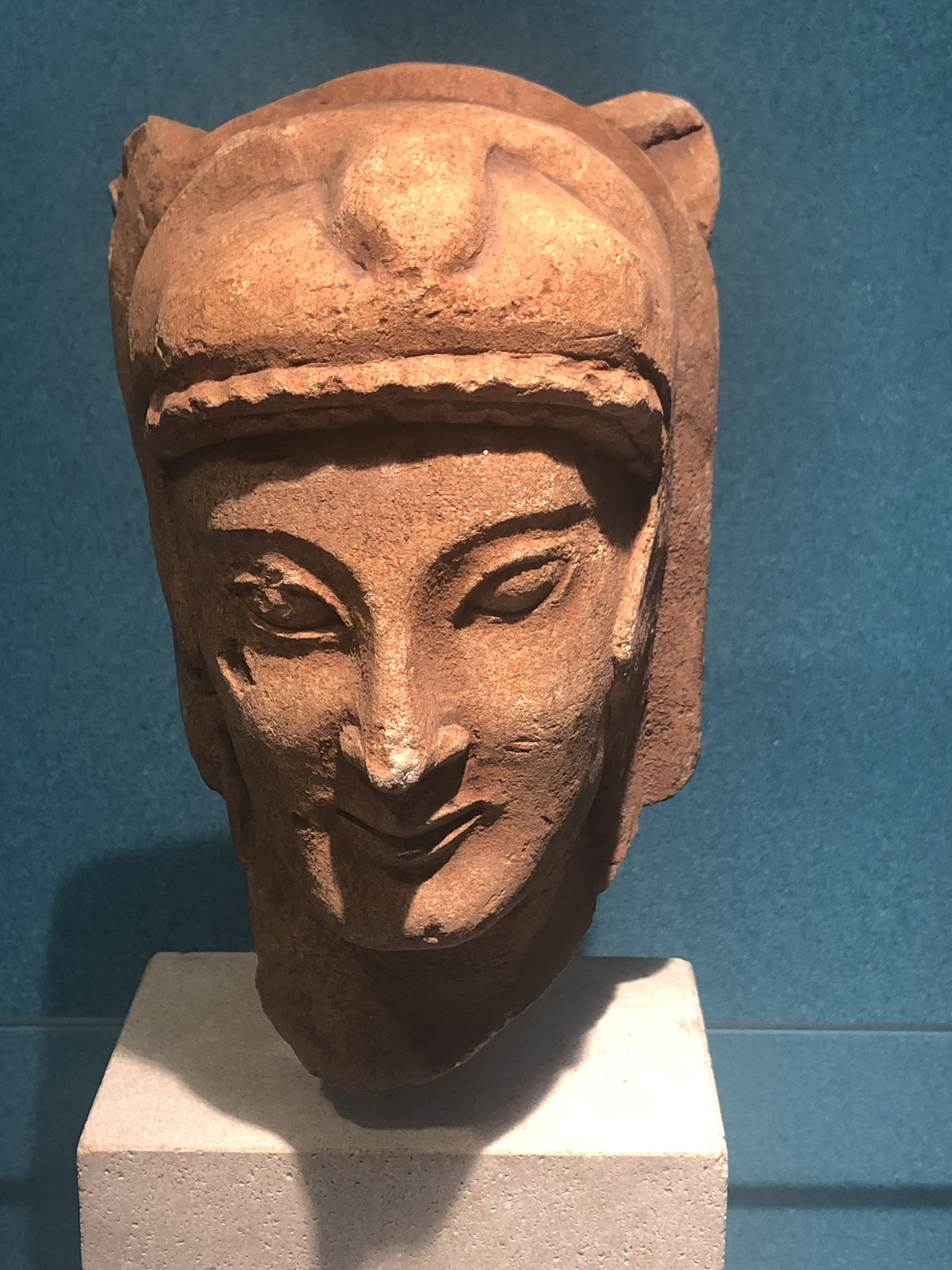
Undated bust of Tyrian Melqart, National Museum of Denmark

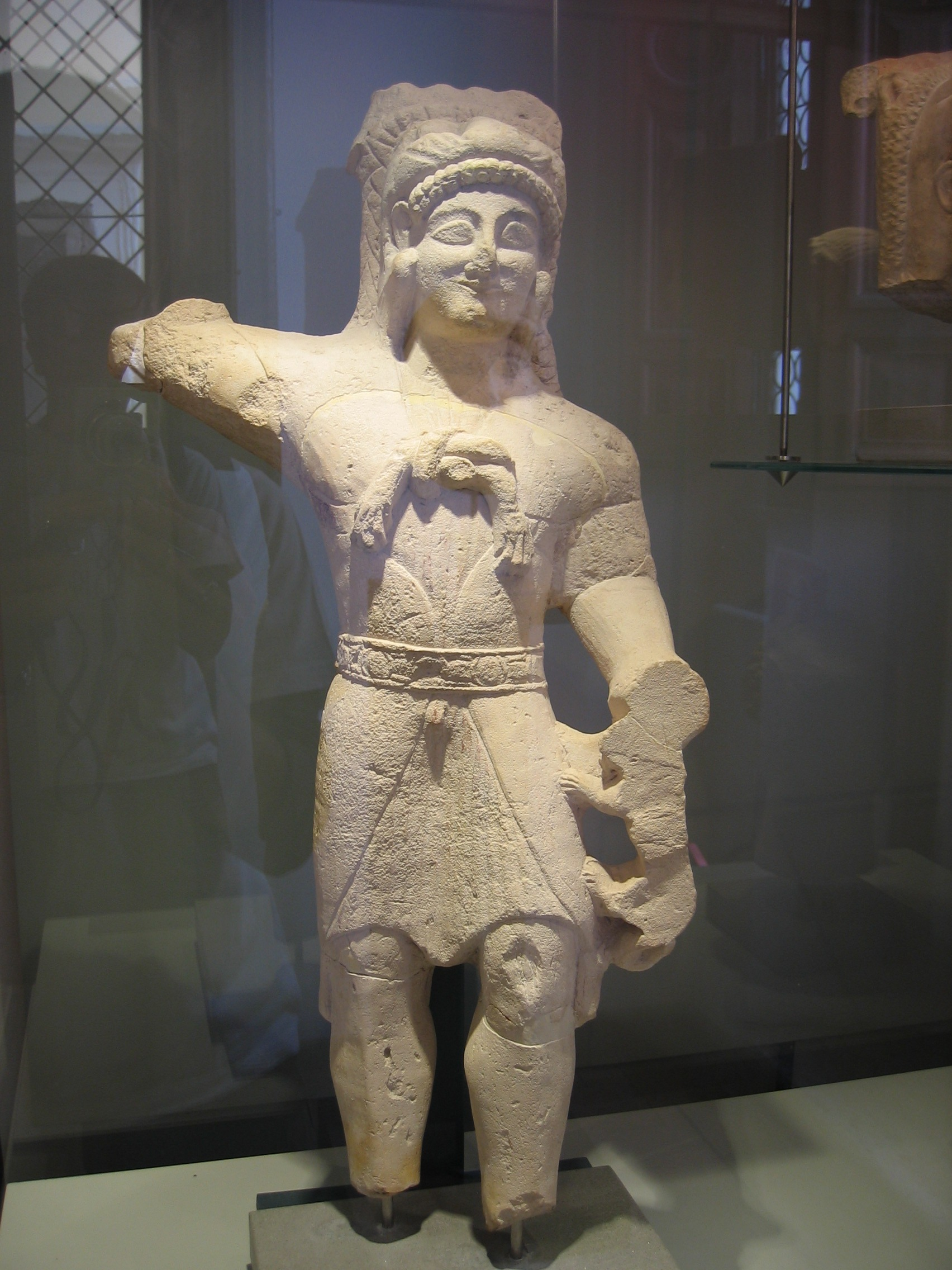
Herakles-Melqart from Cyprus, early 5th century BC

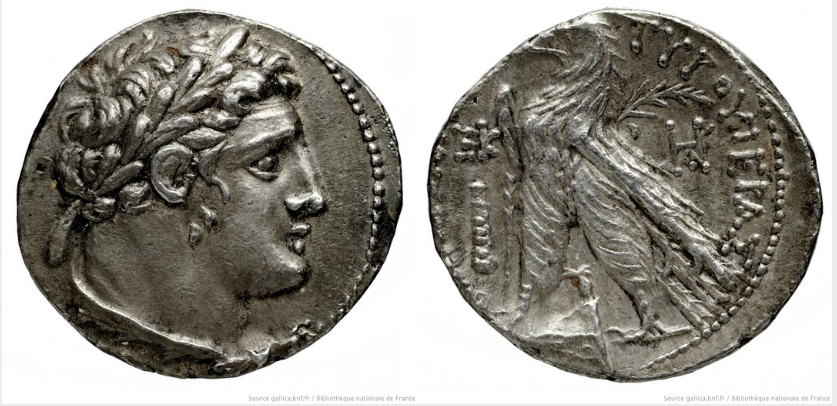
Melkarth on a Tyrian shekel (102 BC) with an eagle (reverse), one foot on a galley prow, next to the god's club

== Archaeological evidence ==
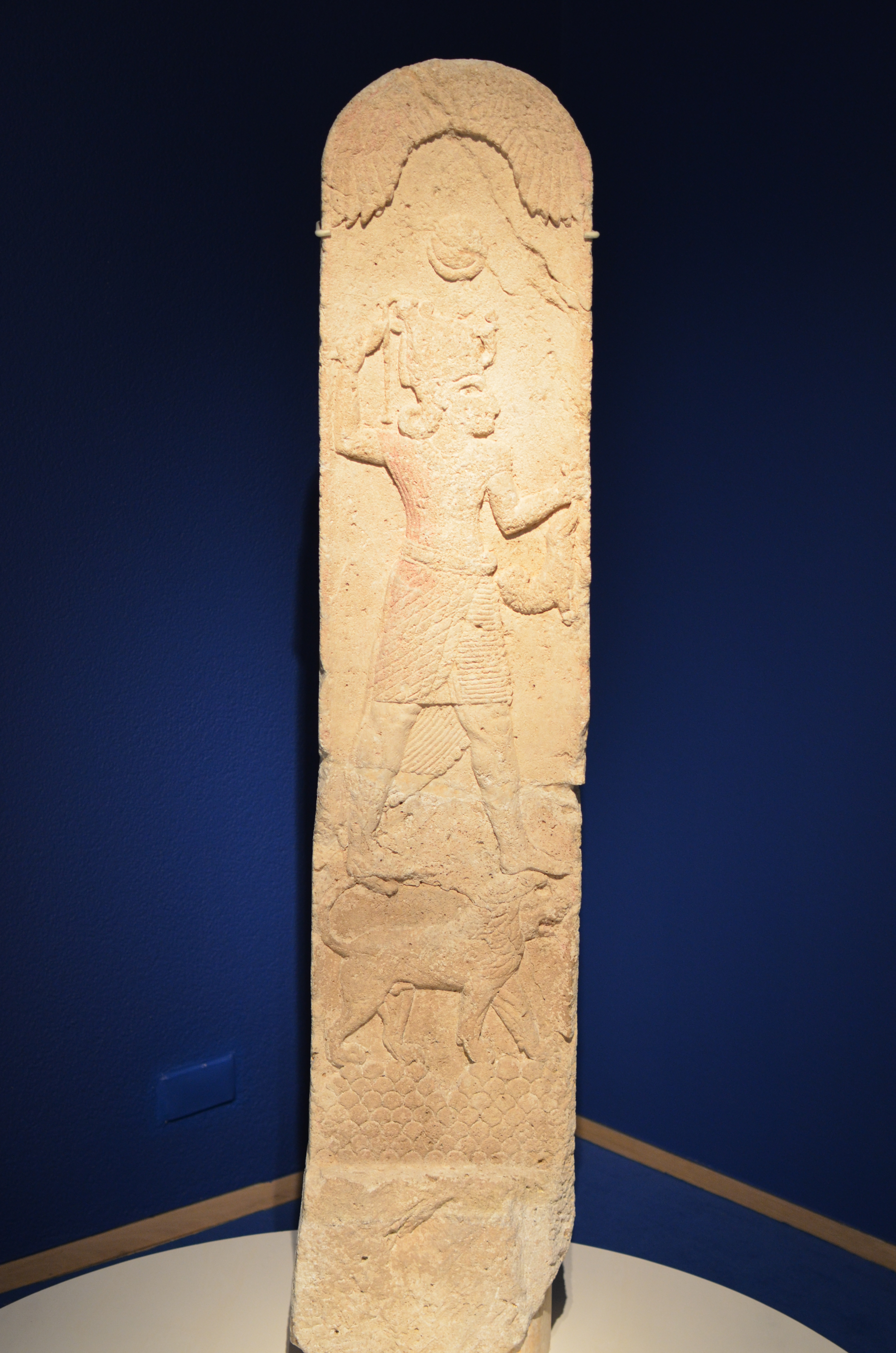
Stela with Melqart on his lion from Amrit in Syria, c. 550 BC

The first occurrence of the name is in the 9th-century BCE "Ben-Hadad" inscription found in 1939 north of Aleppo in today's northern Syria; it had been erected by the son of the king of Aram "for his lord Melqart, which he vowed to him and he heard his voice".

Archaeological evidence for Melqart's cult is found earliest in Tyre and seems to have spread westward with the Phoenician colonies established by Tyre as well as eventually overshadowing the worship of Eshmun in Sidon. The name of Melqart was invoked in oaths sanctioning contracts, according to Dr. María Eugenia Aubet, thus it was customary to build a temple to Melqart, as protector of Tyrian traders, in each new Phoenician colony: at Cádiz, the temple to Melqart is as early as the earliest vestiges of Phoenician occupation. (The Greeks followed a parallel practice in respect to Heracles.) Carthage even sent a yearly tribute of 10% of the public treasury to the god in Tyre up until the Hellenistic period.

In Tyre, the high priest of Melqart ranked second only to the king. Many names in Carthage reflected this importance of Melqart, for example, the names Hamilcar and Bomilcar; but Ba‘l "Lord" as a name-element in Carthaginian names such as Hasdrubal and Hannibal almost certainly does not refer to Melqart but instead refers to Ba`al Hammon, chief god of Carthage, a god identified by Greeks with Cronus and by Romans with Saturn, or is simply used as a title.

Melqart protected the Punic areas of Sicily, such as Cefalù, which was known under Carthaginian rule as "Cape Melqart" (Punic: 𐤓𐤔 𐤌𐤋𐤒𐤓𐤕, rš mlqrt). Melqart's head, indistinguishable from a Heracles, appeared on its coins of the 4th century BCE.

The Cippi of Melqart, found on Malta and dedicated to the god as an ex voto offering, provided the key to understanding the Phoenician language, as the inscriptions on the cippi were written in both Phoenician and Greek.

=== Temple sites ===
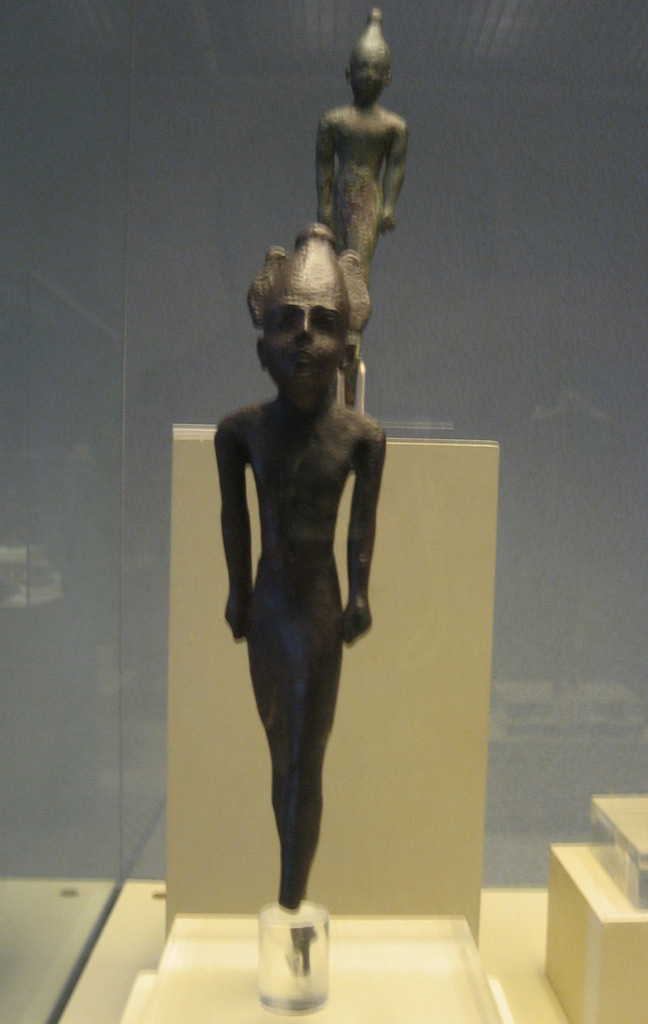
Votive statues from the Temple of Melqart in Cádiz

Temples to Melqart are found at at least three Phoenician/Punic sites in Spain: Cádiz, Ibiza in the Balearic Islands and Cartagena. Near Gades/Gádeira (modern Cádiz) was the westernmost temple of Tyrian Heracles, near the eastern shore of the island (Strabo 3.5.2–3). Strabo notes (3.5.5–6) that the two bronze pillars within the temple, each 8 cubits high, were widely proclaimed to be the true Pillars of Heracles by many who had visited the place and had sacrificed to Heracles there. Strabo believes the account to be fraudulent, in part noting that the inscriptions on those pillars mentioned nothing about Heracles, speaking only of the expenses incurred by the Phoenicians in their making.

Another temple to Melqart was at Ebyssus (Ibiza), in one of four Phoenician sites on the island's south coast. In 2004 a highway crew in the Avinguda Espanya, (one of the main routes into Ibiza), uncovered a further Punic temple in the excavated roadbed. Texts found mention Melqart among other Punic gods Eshmun, Astarte and Baʻl.

Another Iberian temple to Melqart has been identified at Carthago Nova (Cartagena). The Tyrian god's protection extended to the sacred promontory (Cape Saint Vincent) of the Iberian peninsula, the westernmost point of the known world, ground so sacred it was forbidden even to spend the night.

Another temple to Melqart was at Lixus, on the Atlantic coast of Morocco.

== Hannibal and Melqart ==
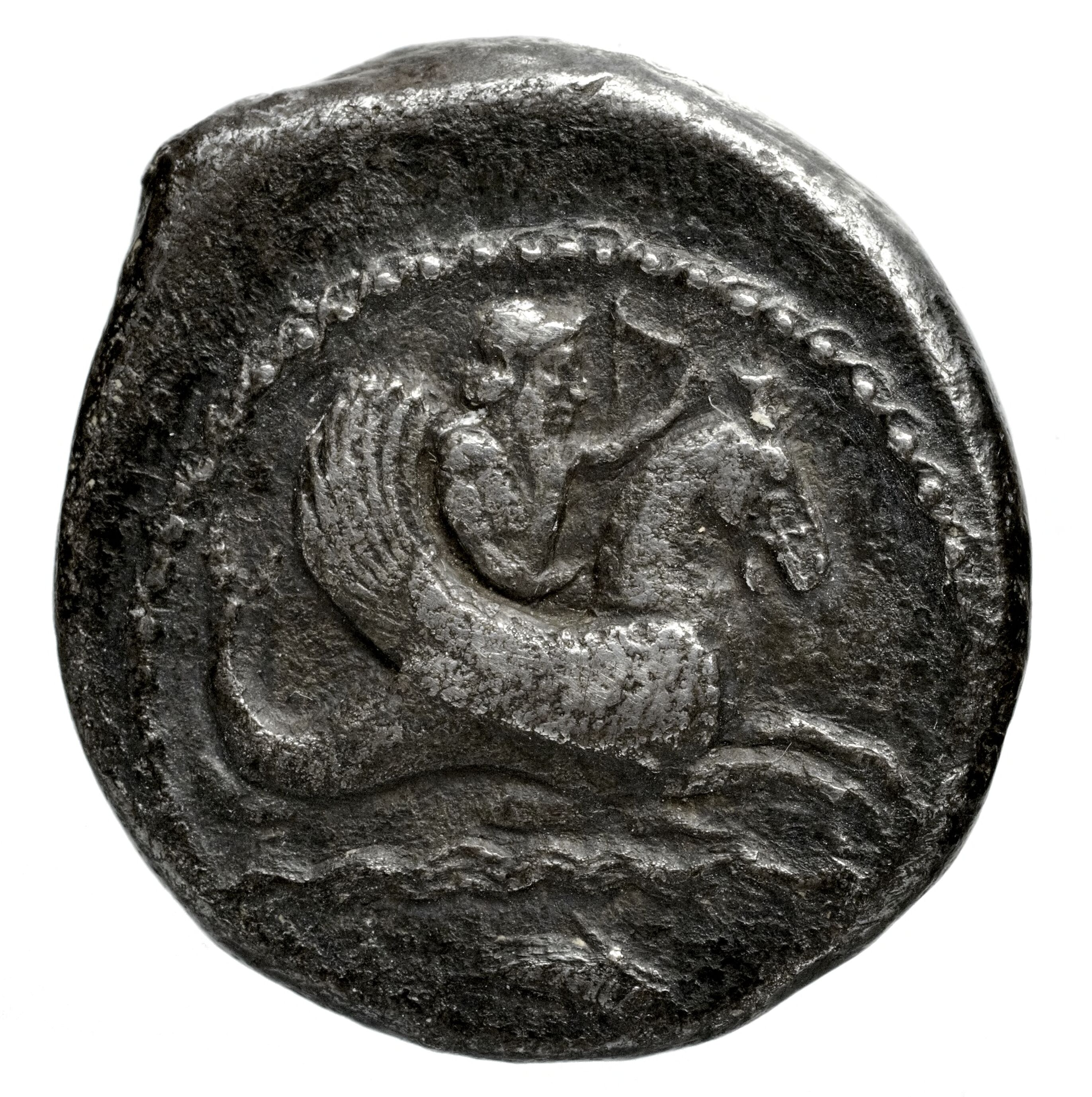
Melqart holding a bow and riding a seahorse, Tyrian coin from c. 425–394 BC

Hannibal was a faithful worshiper of Melqart: the Roman historian Livy records the story that just before setting off on his march to Italy he made a pilgrimage to Gades, the most ancient seat of Phoenician worship in the west. Hannibal strengthened himself spiritually by prayer and sacrifice at the Altar of Melqart. He returned to New Carthage with his mind focused on the god and on the eve of departure to Italy he saw a strange vision which he believed was sent by Melqart.

A youth of divine beauty appeared to Hannibal in the night. The youth told Hannibal he had been sent by the supreme deity, Jupiter, to guide the son of Hamilcar to Italy. "Follow me," said the ghostly visitor, "and see that that thou look not behind thee." Hannibal followed the instructions of the visitor. His curiosity, however, overcame him, and as he turned his head, Hannibal saw a serpent crashing through forest and thicket causing destruction everywhere. It moved as a black tempest with claps of thunder and flashes of lightning gathered behind the serpent. When Hannibal asked the meaning of the vision the being replied, "What thou beholdest is the desolation of Italy. Follow thy star and inquire no farther into the dark counsels of heaven."

== Graeco-Roman traditions ==
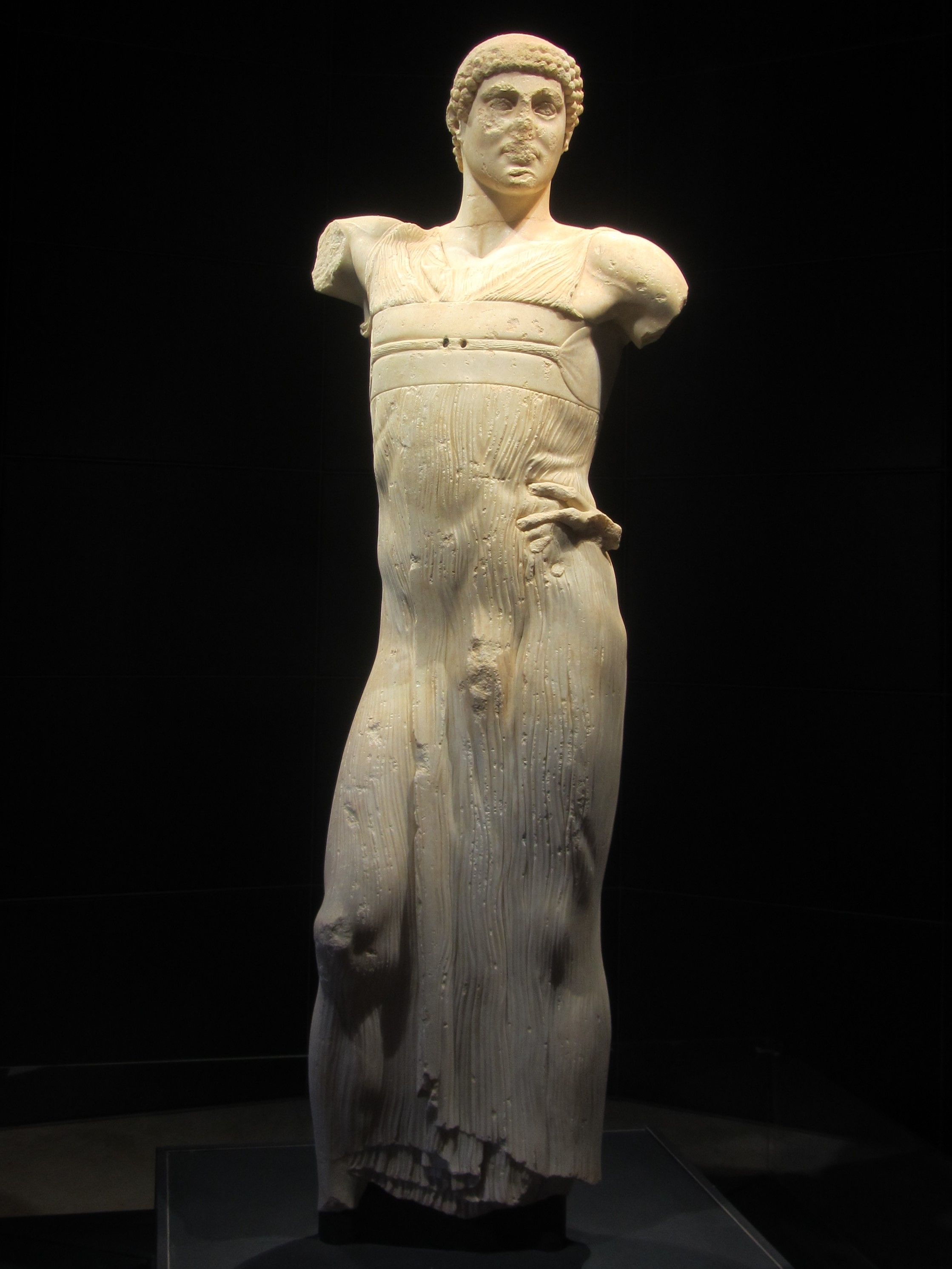
Mozian Charioteer (5th century BC), sometimes interpreted as a Hellenized Melqart

It was suggested by some writers that the Phoenician Melicertes son of Ino found in Greek mythology was in origin a reflection of Melqart. Though no classical source explicitly connects the two, Ino is the daughter of Cadmus of Tyre. Lewis Farnell thought not, referring in 1916 to "the accidental resemblance in sound of Melikertes and Melqart, seeing that Melqart, the bearded god, had no affinity in form or myth with the child- or boy-deity, and was moreover always identified with Herakles: nor do we know anything about Melqart that would explain the figure of Ino that is aboriginally inseparable from Melikertes."

Athenaeus (392d) summarizes a story by Eudoxus of Cnidus (c. 355 BCE) telling how Heracles the son of Zeus by Asteria (= ‘Ashtart ?) was killed by Typhon in Libya. Heracles' companion Iolaus brought a quail to the dead god (presumably a roasted quail) and its delicious scent roused Heracles back to life. This purports to explain why the Phoenicians sacrifice quails to Heracles. It seems that Melqart had a companion similar to the Hellenic Iolaus, who was himself a native of the Tyrian colony of Thebes. Sanchuniathon also makes Melqart under the name Malcarthos or Melcathros, the son of Hadad, who is normally identified with Zeus.

The Pseudo-Clementine Recognitions (10.24) speaks of the tombs of various gods, including "that of Heracles at Tyre, where he was burnt with fire." The Hellenic Heracles also died on a pyre, but the event was located on Mount Oeta in Trachis. A similar tradition is recorded by Dio Chrysostom (Or. 33.47) who mentions the beautiful pyre which the Tarsians used to build for their Heracles, referring here to the Cilician god Sandon.

In Nonnus' Dionysiaca (40.366–580) the Tyrian Heracles is very much a Sun-god. However, there is a tendency in the later Hellenistic and Roman periods for almost all gods to develop solar attributes, and for almost all eastern gods to be identified with the Sun. Nonnus gives the title Astrochiton 'Starclad' to Tyrian Heracles and has his Dionysus recite a hymn to this Heracles, saluting him as "the son of Time, he who causes the threefold image of the Moon, the all-shining Eye of the heavens". Rain is ascribed to the shaking from his head of the waters of his bath in the eastern Ocean. His Sun-disk is praised as the cause of growth in plants. Then, in a climactic burst of syncretism, Dionysus identifies the Tyrian Heracles with Belus on the Euphrates, Ammon in Libya, Apis by the Nile, Arabian Cronus, Assyrian Zeus, Serapis, Zeus of Egypt, Cronus, Phaethon, Mithras, Delphic Apollo, Gamos 'Marriage', and Paeon 'Healer'.

The Tyrian Heracles answers by appearing to Dionysus. There is red light in the fiery eyes of this shining god who clothed in a robe embroidered like the sky (presumably with various constellations). He has yellow, sparkling cheeks and a starry beard. The god reveals how he taught the primeval, earthborn inhabitants of Phoenicia how to build the first boat and instructed them to sail out to a pair of floating, rocky islands. On one of the islands there grew an olive tree with a serpent at its foot, an eagle at its summit, and which glowed in the middle with fire that burned but did not consume. Following the god's instructions, these primeval humans sacrificed the eagle to Poseidon, Zeus, and the other gods. Thereupon the islands rooted themselves to the bottom of the sea. On these islands the city of Tyre was founded.

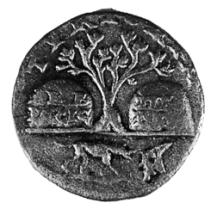
A Phoenician coin depicting the legend of the dog biting the sea snail

Gregory of Nazianzus and Cassiodorus relate how Tyrian Heracles and the nymph Tyrus were walking along the beach when Heracles' dog, who was accompanying them, devoured a murex snail and gained a beautiful purple color around its mouth. Tyrus told Heracles she would never accept him as her lover until he gave her a robe of that same colour. So Heracles gathered many murex shells, extracted the dye from them, and dyed the first garment of the colour later called Tyrian purple. The murex shell appears on the very earliest Tyrian coins and then reappears again on coins in Imperial Roman times.

From the sixth century BCE. onward in Cyprus, where there was strong Phoenician cultural influence on the western side of the island, Melqart was often depicted with Heracles' traditional symbols of a lion skin and club, although it is unclear how strongly this connection between the figures was throughout the rest of Phoenician culture.

== Attempts at a synthesis ==
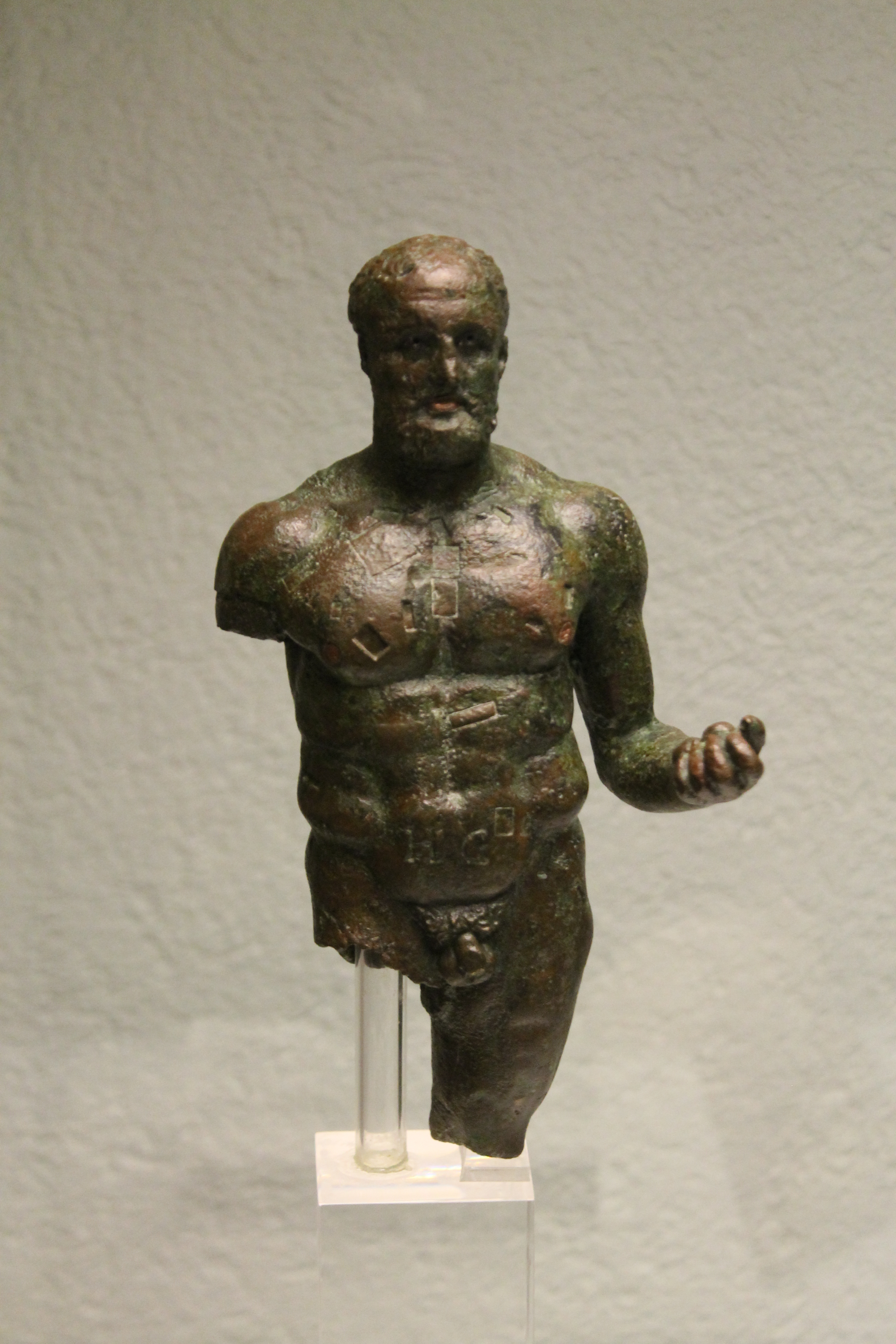
Bronze statuette of Melqart from the historical Temple of Melqart at Cadiz (Sancti Petri, Museum of Cádiz)

The paucity of evidence on Melqart has led to debate as to the nature of his cult and his place in the Phoenician pantheon. William F. Albright suggested he was a god of the underworld partly because the god Milku, who may be Melqart, is sometimes equated with the Mesopotamian god Nergal, a god of the underworld, whose name also means 'King of the City'. Others take this to be coincidental, since what is known about Melqart from other sources does not suggest an underworld god, and the city in question could conceivably be Tyre. It has been suggested that Melqart began as a sea god who was later given solar attributes, or alternatively that he began as a solar god who later received the attributes of a sea god.

== Historical person ==
Herodotus said that the Temple of Melqart at Tyre had a tomb in its sanctuary, supporting the theory that involved as he was in the founding mythology of Tyre, perhaps Melqart was based on a real historical person. Other classical authors say that this supposed Tomb of Melqart was moved to southern Spain, possibly Cádiz.

In late 2021, archeologists from Seville University claimed to have located the historical Temple of Melqart of Spain, which classical authors believed to have contained the supposed Tomb of Melqart, at modern-day Sancti Petri, Cádiz.

== See also ==
- For information on the title Ba‘al, which was applied to many gods who would not normally be identified with Melqart, see Ba‘al.
- For views about whether and how Melqart connects with biblical references to Moloch, see Moloch.
- For views about whether and how Melqart connects with the names of God in Islam, see Malek
