= Castle of Sancti Petri =

- Castillo de Sancti Petri (Spanish)
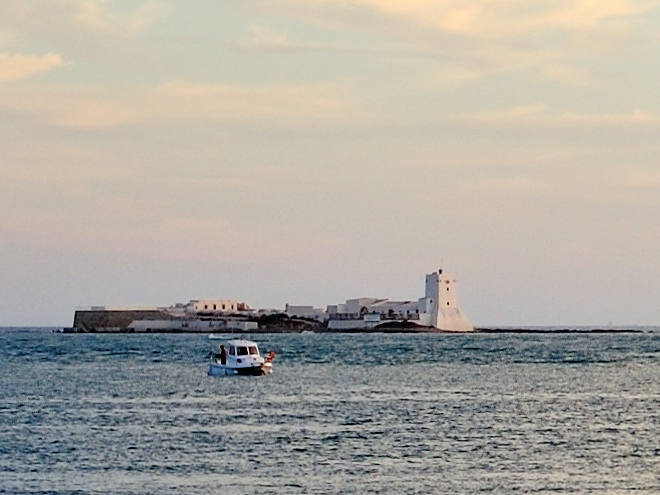

- Location within Spain
- 36.379746°N 6.220068°W
- Location: San Fernando, Spain

Spanish Cultural Heritage
- Official name: Castillo de Aznalmara
- Type: Non-movable
- Criteria: Monument
- Designated: 1985
- Reference no.: RI-51-0007584

The Castle of Sancti Petri (Castilian: Piedras Santas) is a stronghold located in San Fernando, Province of Cádiz, Andalusia, southwestern Spain. Situated on the little island of Sancti Petri, the defensive fortification was once one of a series of forts that protected the inlet, Caño de Sancti Petri. Of irregular shape and in the Moorish style, it dates from the 13th century. During the 1st century, the Phoenicians settled on the island, founding a temple dedicated to Melqart, their god, . When the Romans arrived they dedicated the temple to Hercules. The castle's watchtower is the oldest building, while the walls and the interior date from the 18th century. The castle was in an advanced state of deterioration, but the authorities of the municipalities of San Fernando and Chiclana de la Frontera funded a major rehabilitation programme. It was declared a Cultural Monument by Decree of April 22, 1949, and Law 16/1985, as a Spanish Historical Heritage landmark. In 1993, the Andalusian authorities gave it special recognition amongst the castles of the Autonomous Community of Andalusia.
