= Islote de Sancti Petri =

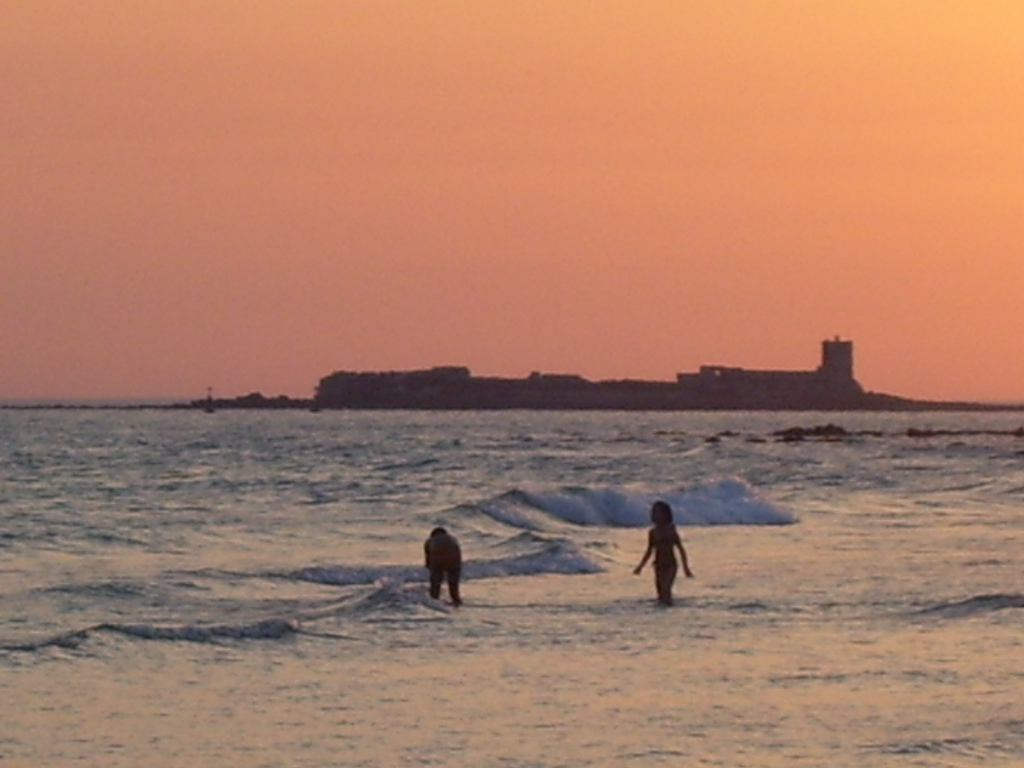
View of islote and castle of Sancti Petri in San Fernando, Cádiz.

The Islote de Sancti Petri is a small barren island belonging to the municipality of San Fernando, Cádiz in the province of Cádiz and the autonomous region of Andalusia, Spain. It is close to the coast and 16 kilometres (10 mi) south of Cadiz city.

For many years, the island was a restricted military zone, but it is now under the control of the Spanish Environment Ministry. In the first century BC, the Greek historian Strabo mentioned in his book Geographica that the Tyrians founded Gadeira, building a sanctuary to Melkart, known as Hercules to the Greeks, in the eastern part of the island and the city in the western part.

== Castle ==
Sancti-petri castle
- Sancti-petri (Spanish)
- Location within Province of Cádiz Location within Andalusia Location within Spain
- 36.379607°N 6.220177°W
- Location: San Fernando, Cádiz, Spain

Spanish Cultural Heritage
- Official name: Sancti-petri castle
- Type: Non-movable
- Criteria: Monument
- Designated: 1993
- Reference no.: RI-51-0007584

The ruins of an eighteenth-century castle remain on the island; the tower of the castle has been substantially rebuilt, and it is now in use as a lighthouse. It was declared Bien de Interés Cultural in 1993.

The name, Sancti Petri, also applies to the beach on the mainland, in Chiclana de la Frontera, directly opposite the island.
