= Almadraba =

Ancient technique of the Phoenicians for catching bluefin tuna

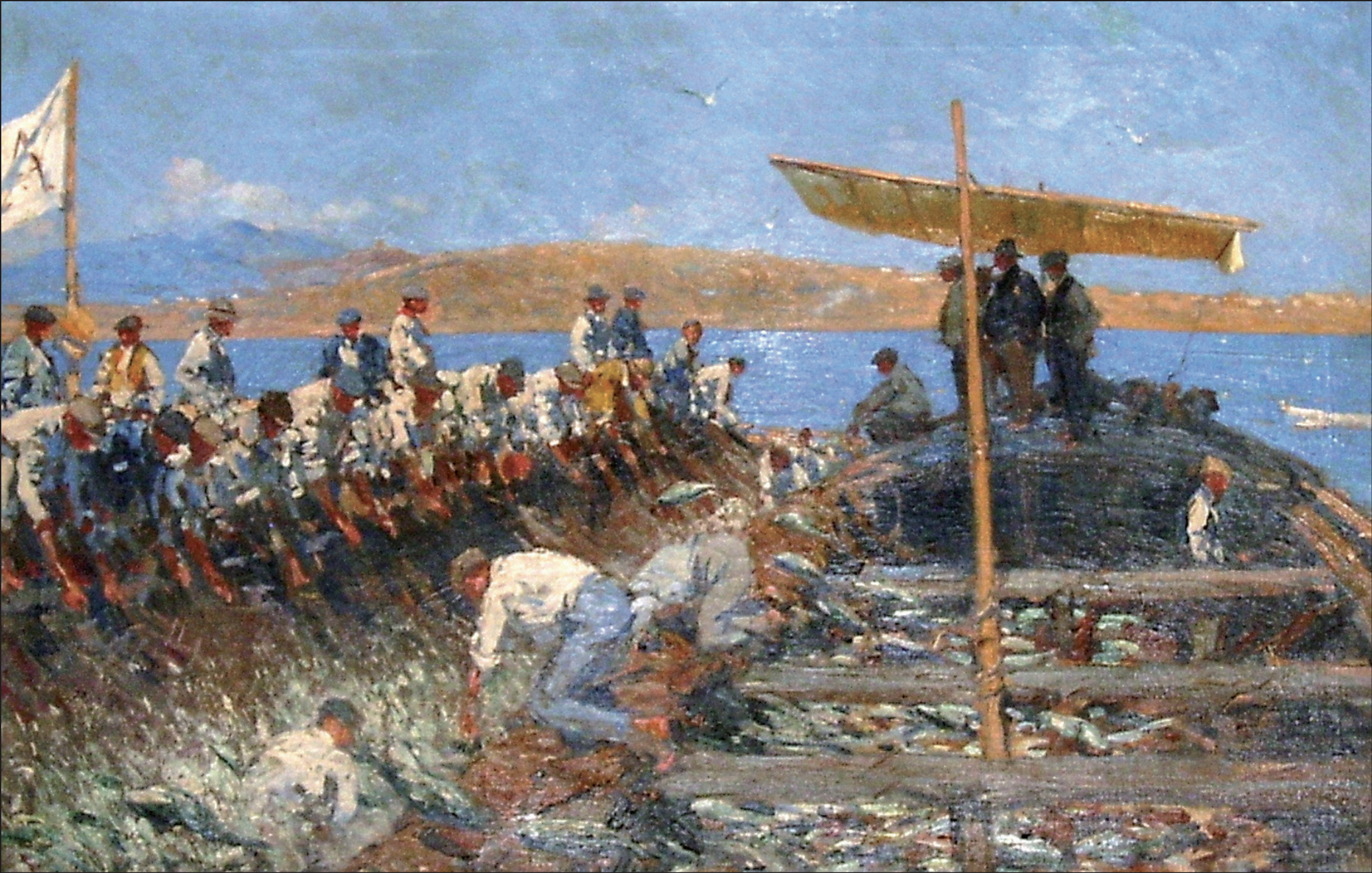
A depiction of almadraba in a painting by Mariano Bertuchi.

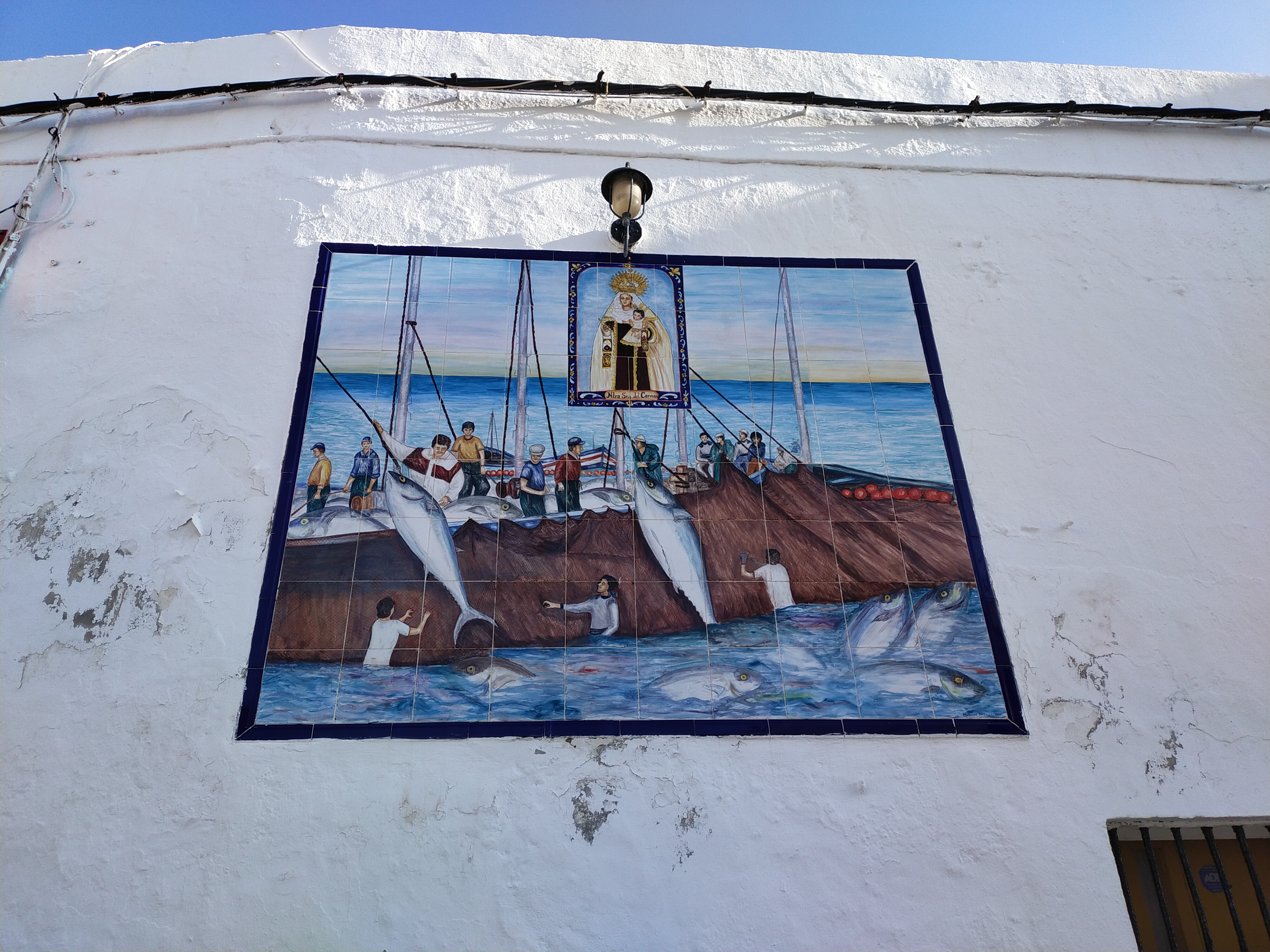
Tiles featuring a scene of tuna catching on a wall at Conil de la Frontera, Spain. The scene is overseen by Our Lady of MounCarmel.

Almadraba (a Spanish word coming from Andalusian Arabic: المَضْرَٰبَة, romanized: al-maḍraba, lit. 'the place to strike'; in Portuguese: almadrava) is an elaborate and ancient technique for trapping and catching Atlantic bluefin tuna (Thunnus thynnus).

The technique, in its most simple iteration, consists in setting up net barriers to trap the tuna when they migrate into the Mediterranean Sea from the Atlantic Ocean (February to July), on their way to spawn and until recently, on their return journey, ("al revés"); the bycatch contains, among others, bullet tuna (Auxis rochei), little tunny (Euthynnus alletteratus), Atlantic bonito (Sarda sarda), bigeye tuna (Thunnus obesus) and swordfish (Xiphias gladius).

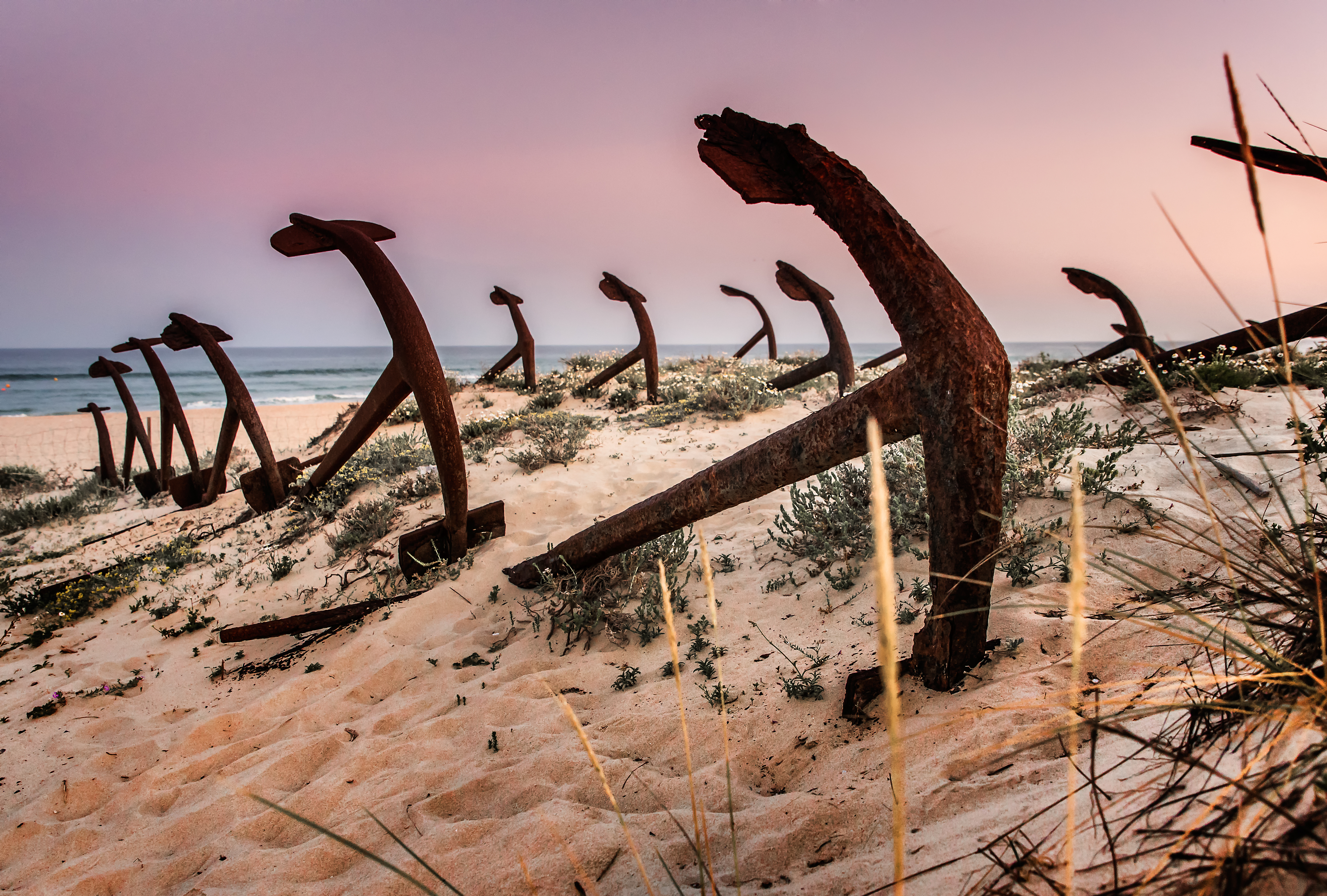
Graveyard of Anchors on Tavira Island which were used in the Almadrava

It is a traditional form of fishing practiced mainly in southeastern Spain (Andalusia, Murcia and southern Valencian Community), Morocco and southern Portugal (the Algarve). Almadrabas have been set from the ports of Cádiz, Chiclana de la Frontera, Conil de la Frontera, Barbate, Rota, Zahara de los Atunes, La Línea de la Concepción, Nueva Umbría, Isla Cristina, Ceuta and Tarifa, among other ports.

A similar technique exists in Sicily known as mattanza (a borrowing from the Spanish word matanza, meaning 'slaughter').

== In film ==
- Roberto Rossellini's film Stromboli includes a scene where the protagonist watches her husband use almadraba.
- Rupert Murray's The End of the Line (2009 film) demonstrates almadraba when discussing declining catches.
- Portuguese short documentary film pt:A Almadraba Atuneira, directed by Antonio Campos.

== See also ==
- Barbate, town known for its Almadraba fishing.
- The Dukes of Medina-Sidonia made their fortune on the monopoly of Andalusian almadrabas from the 12th to the 19th century.
- Zahara de los Atunes, an Andalusian town named after the tunas of its almadraba.
- Castle of Zahara de los Atunes and Palace of Jadraza
- Cartagena
- Tavira Island, in the Algarve, Portugal.
