= Castle of Zahara de los Atunes and Palace of Jadraza =

Medieval castle in Barbate, Spain

- El Castillo de Zahara de los Atunes. Palacio de la Jadraza (Spanish)
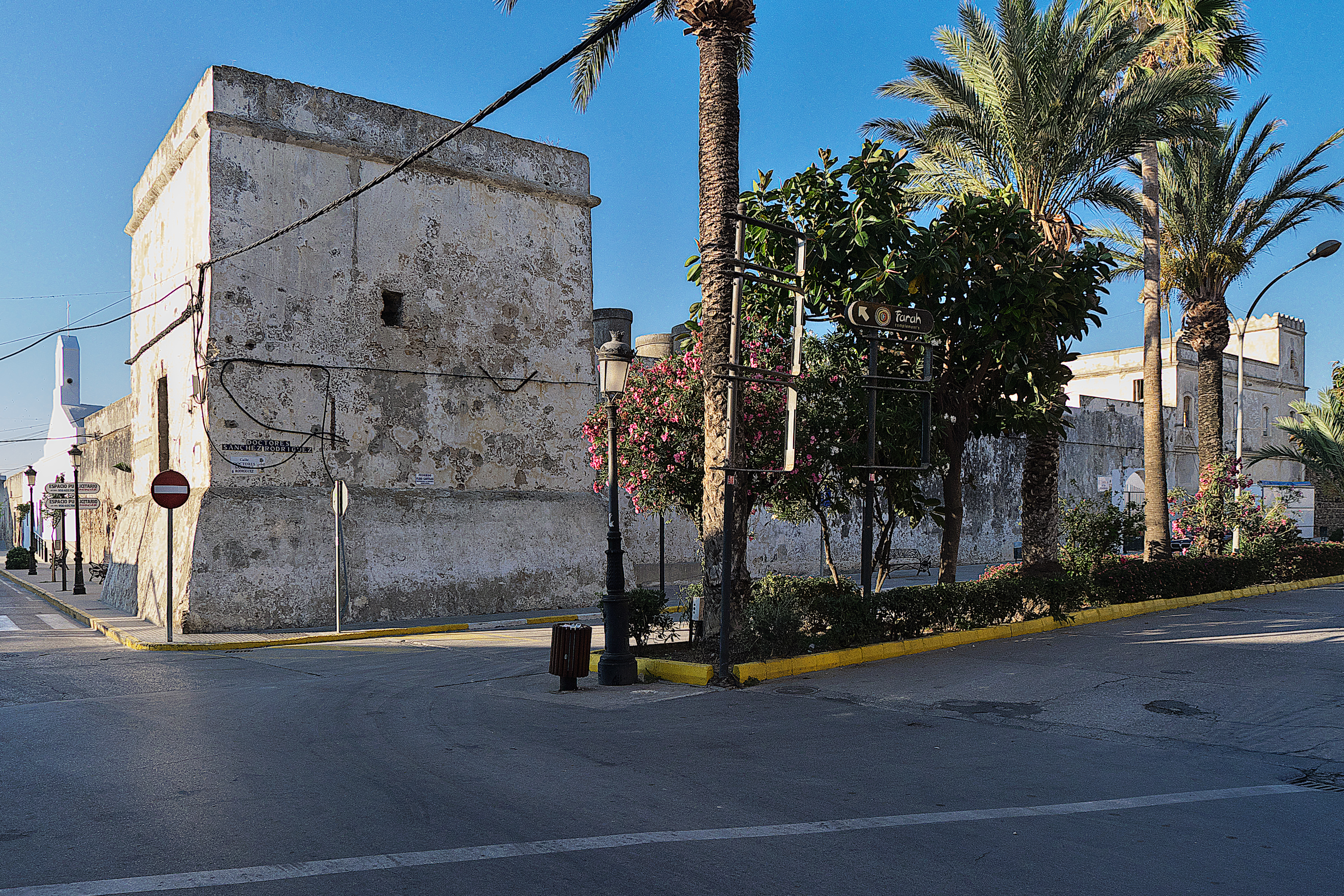

- Location within Spain
- 36.135694°N 5.845934°W
- Location: Barbate and Zahara de los Atunes, Spain

Spanish Cultural Heritage
- Official name: El Castillo de Zahara de los Atunes. Palacio de la Jadraza
- Type: Non-movable
- Criteria: Monument
- Designated: 2004
- Reference no.: RI-51-0011064

The Castle of Zahara de los Atunes and Palace of Jadraza (Spanish: El Castillo de Zahara de los Atunes. Palacio de la Jadraza) is a medieval castle on Spain's coast. Located in Barbate and Zahara de los Atunes, Spain, it protected the local Almadraba tuna traps as well as having a wider strategic role.

It is known by several alternative names including Fortaleza o Castillo de la Chanca, Fortaleza y Casa Chanca, Palacio de las Pilas, Castillo de Jadraza & Palacio Real de la Almadraba.

== History ==
In 1294, King Sancho IV of Castile granted a licence to Don Alonso Pérez de Guzmán to build traps for tuna fishing in reward for his heroic defense of Tarifa. This activity in this area has a history dating back to Phoenician and Roman times. Guzman fisheries in Zahara de los Atunes and Conil de la Frontera were for centuries the most productive in Europe provoking the development of important auxiliary buildings.

The Palace served three functions: as a fortified castle to protect against Barbary pirates, a residential palace during the Tuna Season and a processing plant to deal with the tuna.

Its location at a strategic point of the Strait of Gibraltar has been given prominence in numerous historical events, and it maintains a continued presence in coastal mapping.

In the twentieth century the building was used by the fishing industry before becoming a barracks. The building was declared Bien de Interés Cultural in 2004.

== Structure ==
Building is a square structure defined by four defensive walls with parapet surmounted with a narrow walkway. In the north-west corner is the so-called Torre de Poniente which has an inner chamber beneath a high domed roof also with a parapet. In the north-east are the remains of de la Torre de Levante. Both towers were designed as corbelled spaces to overlook the defensive curtain walls.

The main gateway is located in the west wall, the two sea gates are in the south, which originally also provided access to large patio inner enclosure of the building. In the twentieth century 'New Gate' was added in the north wall, where there are also various other piercings introduced for practical reasons as the use of the building developed over time.

The factory is made of regular masonry blocks with lime grout and pebbles. The corners boast reinforced stonework. The three original stone doors were of generous proportions with arches and keystones . At the sea gates, two separate buttresses of considerable thickness are arranged inward to reinforce them in their defensive mission.
