= Barbate (river) =

River in Spain

Coordinates: 36°22′00″N 5°43′44″W

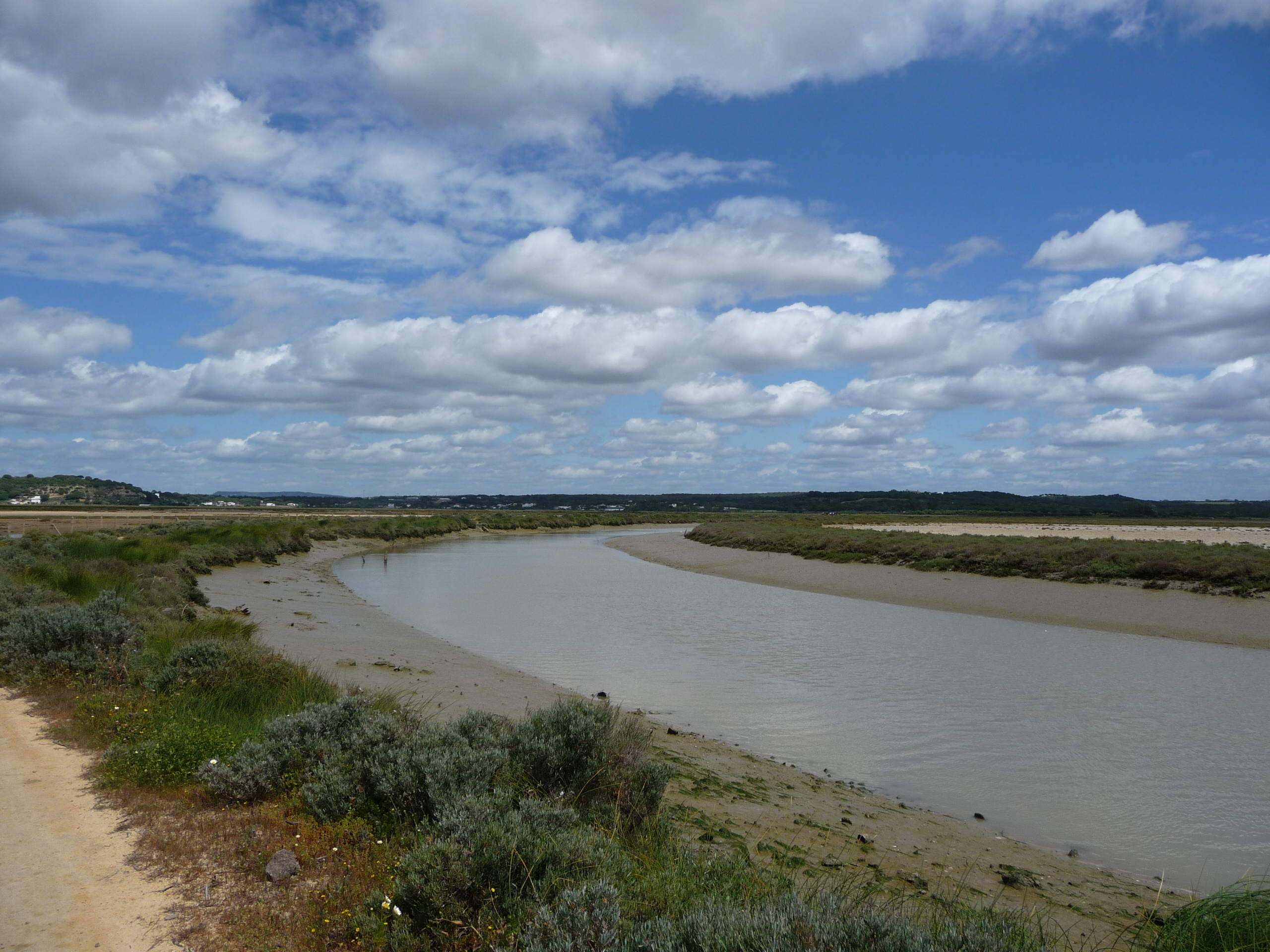

Location
- Country: Spain

Physical characteristics
- Source
  - location: Sierra del Aljibe
  - elevation: 920 metres (3,020 ft)
- Mouth
  - location: Atlantic Ocean (Barbate)
  - elevation: 0 m (0 ft)
- Length: 80 km (50 mi)
- Basin size: 1,290 km^{2} (500 sq mi)

Basin features
- Tributaries
  - left: Almodóvar

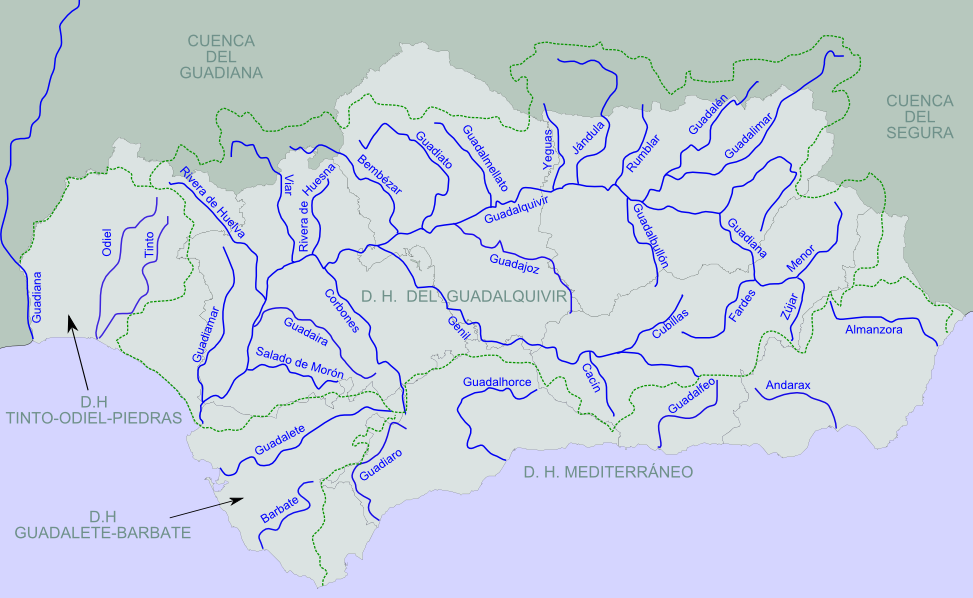
Rivers of Andalusia. The Barbate is in western Andalusia, slightly to the left on this map of Gibraltar, the southernmost point of the Iberian Peninsula.

The Barbate (Spanish: Río Barbate) is a coastal river in southern Spain. It flows into the Atlantic Ocean at Barbate (the town after which it is named) in the province of Cádiz, autonomous community of Andalusia.

The Barbate begins in the northern foothills of the Sierra del Aljibe, at an elevation of 920 metres (3,020 ft) above sea level. The upper portion of the river descends rapidly, running through Triassic terrain, and dropping 600 metres (2,000 ft) in barely 10 kilometres (6 mi); after that, the river descends gently over Eocene terrain, losing only 200 metres (660 ft) in the rest of its course, which after the confluence with the river Alberite flows through Quaternary terrain. Because the river, with a length of over 80 kilometres (50 mi), flows in all but its upper part through relatively flat land, it meanders considerably.

The Barbate and its tributaries drain an area of 1,290 square kilometres (500 sq mi) (17.6 percent of the province of Cádiz). It runs through wide colluvial plains and the magnificent dark clay soils the Spanish call bujeo or the tierras negras andaluzas ("black Andalusian lands"), arriving finally in the desiccated former Janda Lagoon, where the River Almodóvar flows into the Barbate from the left. Other tributaries are the Rocinejo, the Celemín (river), the Álamo and the Fraja.

It then passes Alcalá de los Gazules, Benalup-Casas Viejas, and after passing through the gorge of Barca de Vejer, it passes through the 9 kilometres (5.6 mi) of the Marismas de Barbate, to its mouth at Barbate.
