= La Breña y Marismas del Barbate Natural Park =

Natural park in Spain

Natural Park of La Breña y Marismas del Barbate
- Parque natural de la Breña y Marismas del Barbate
- IUCN category V (protected landscape/seascape)
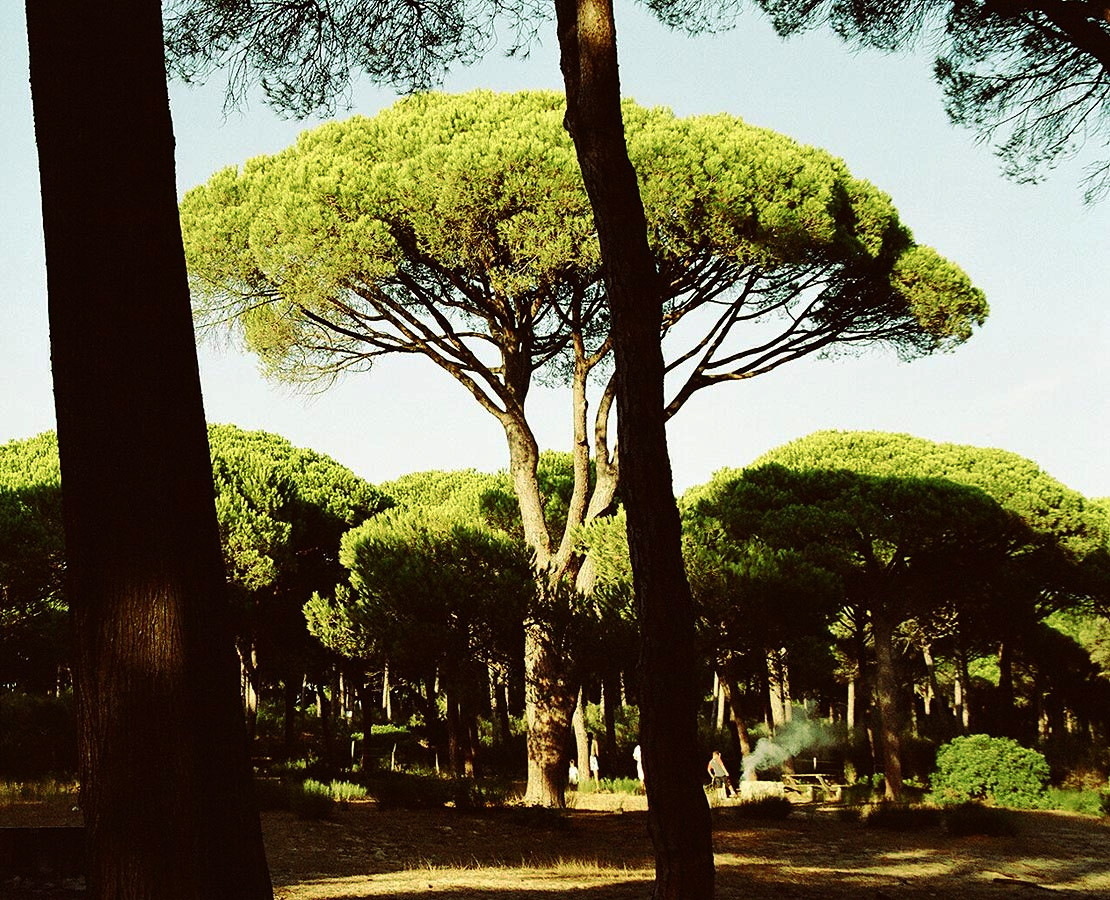
- Pine plantation
- Interactive map of Natural Park of La Breña y Marismas del Barbate
- Location: Spain
- Nearest city: Cádiz
- Coordinates: 36°10′44″N 5°58′22″W
- Established: 1989

La Breña y Marismas del Barbate Natural Park is a natural park on the coast of the province of Cádiz, Spain. The park includes marine and terrestrial ecosystems. An area of the natural park has been planted with pines to control the spread of sand-dunes.

The fishing-port of Barbate is on the edge of the park.

== Gallery ==
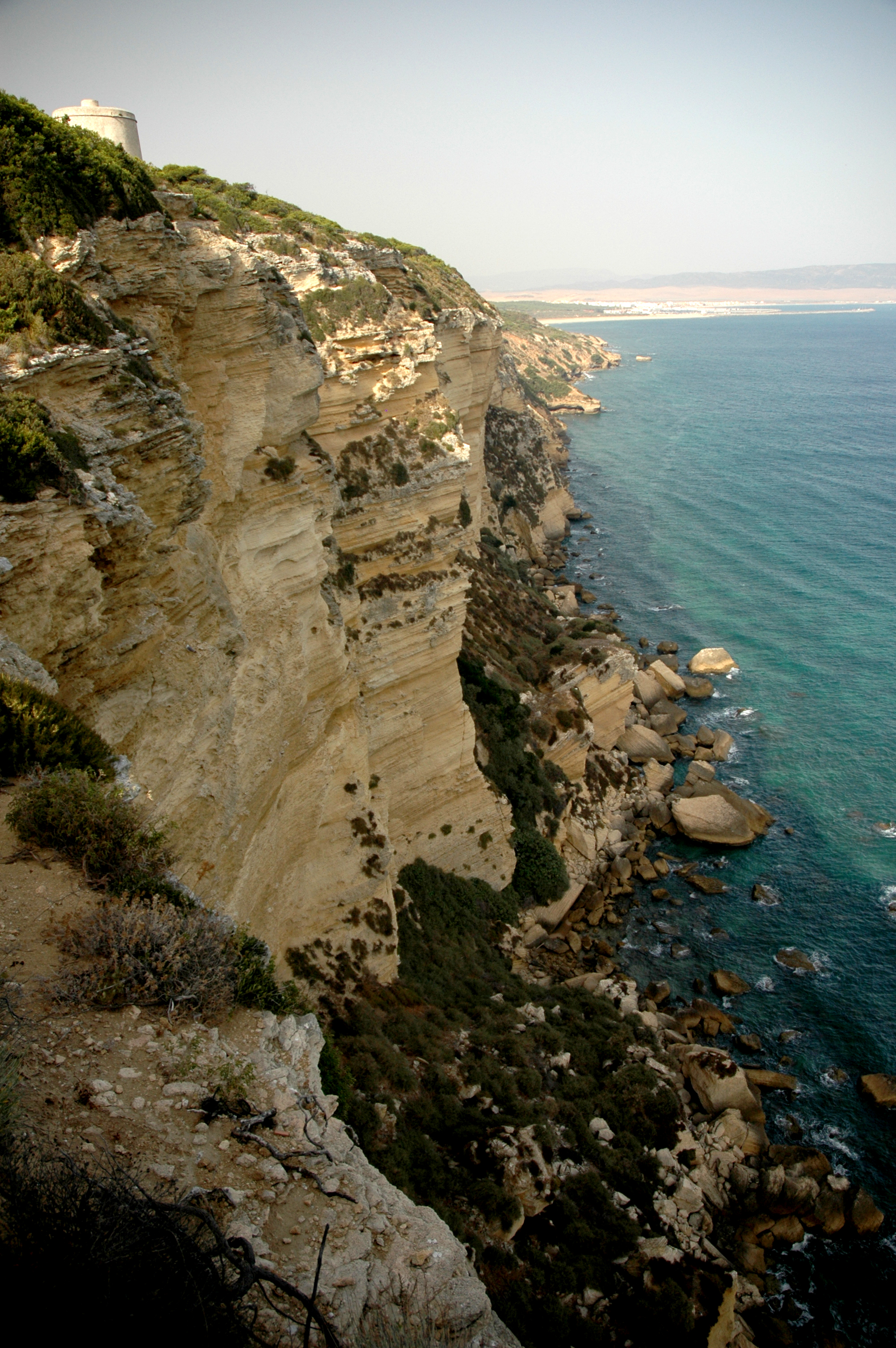

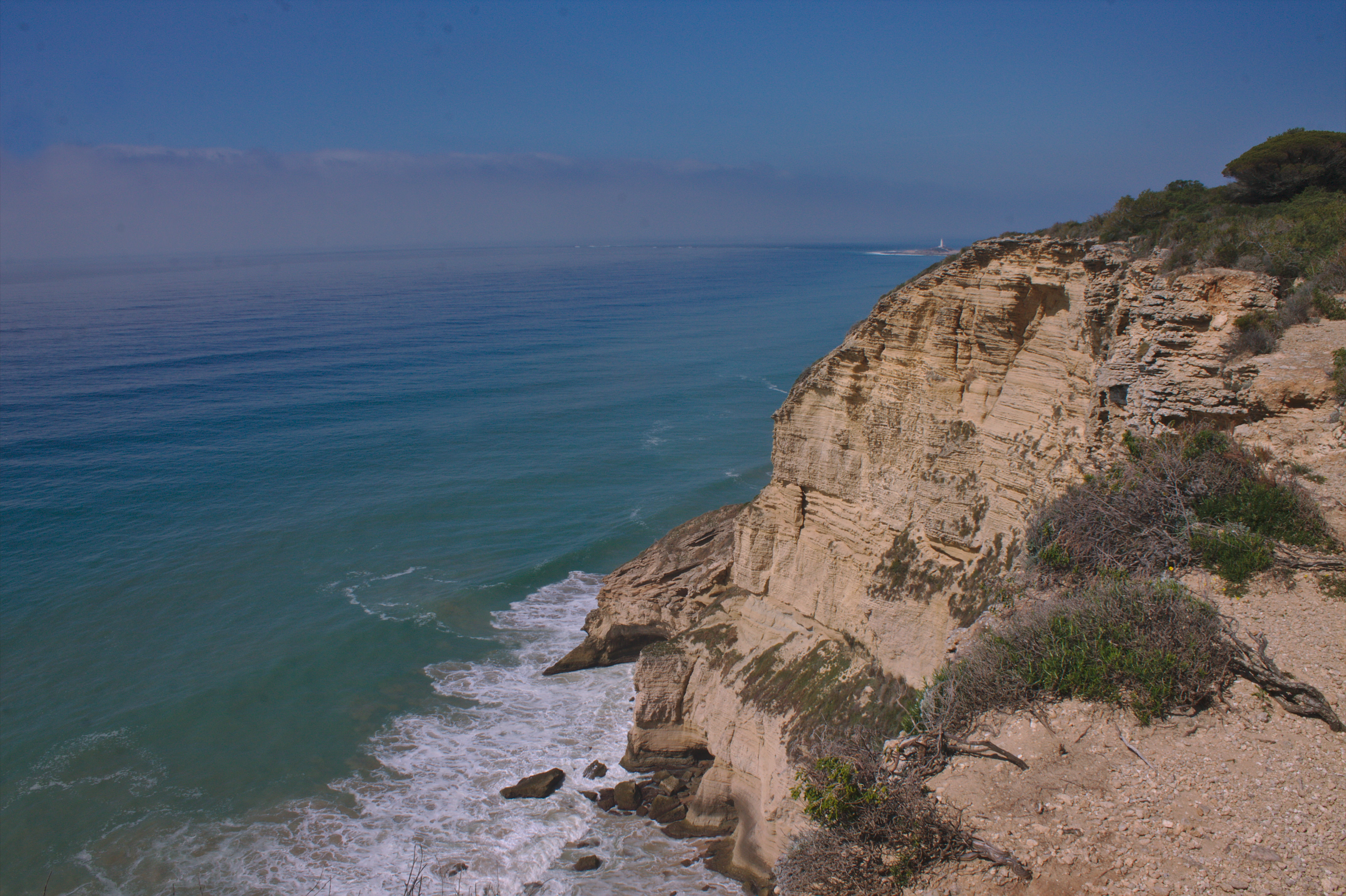

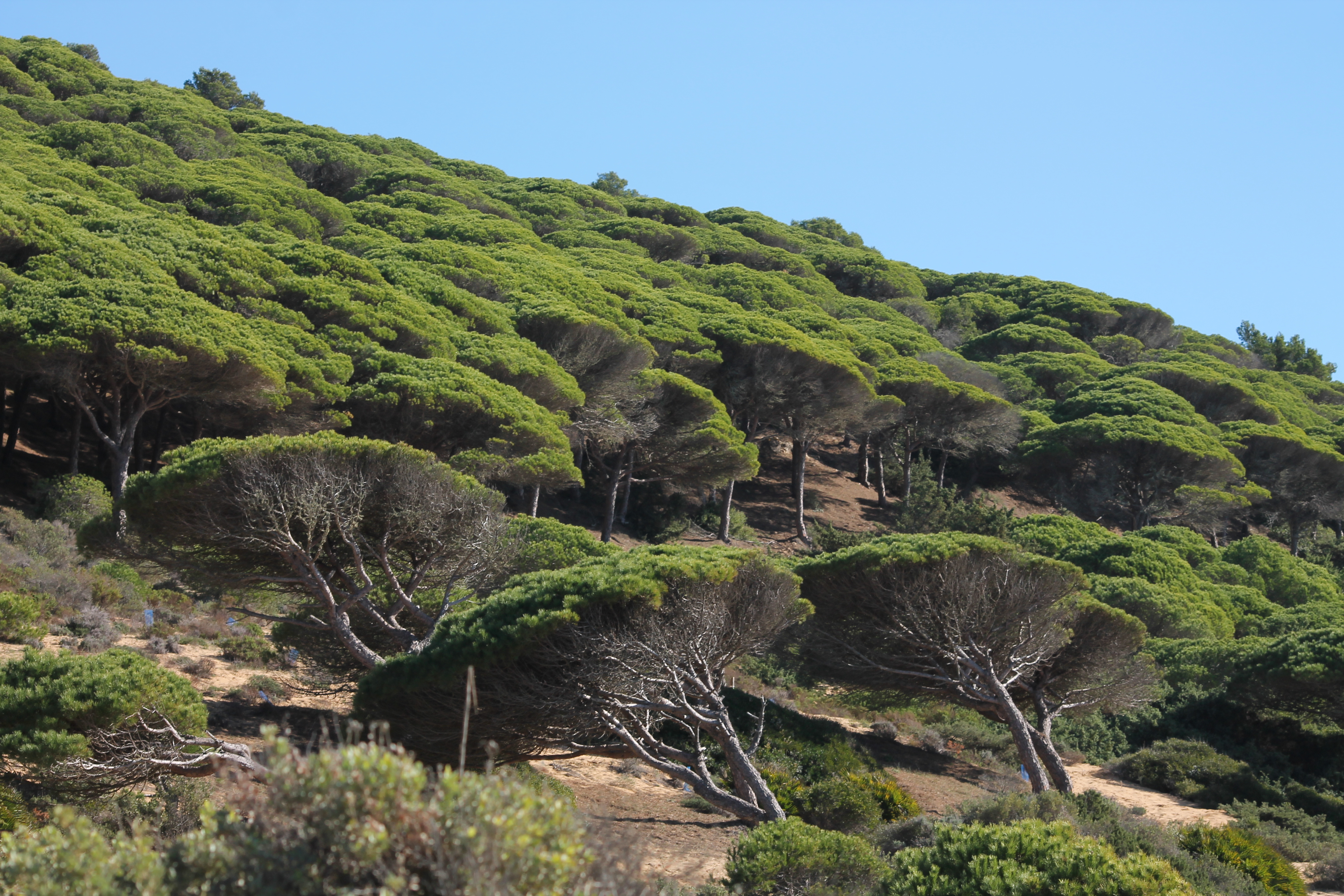

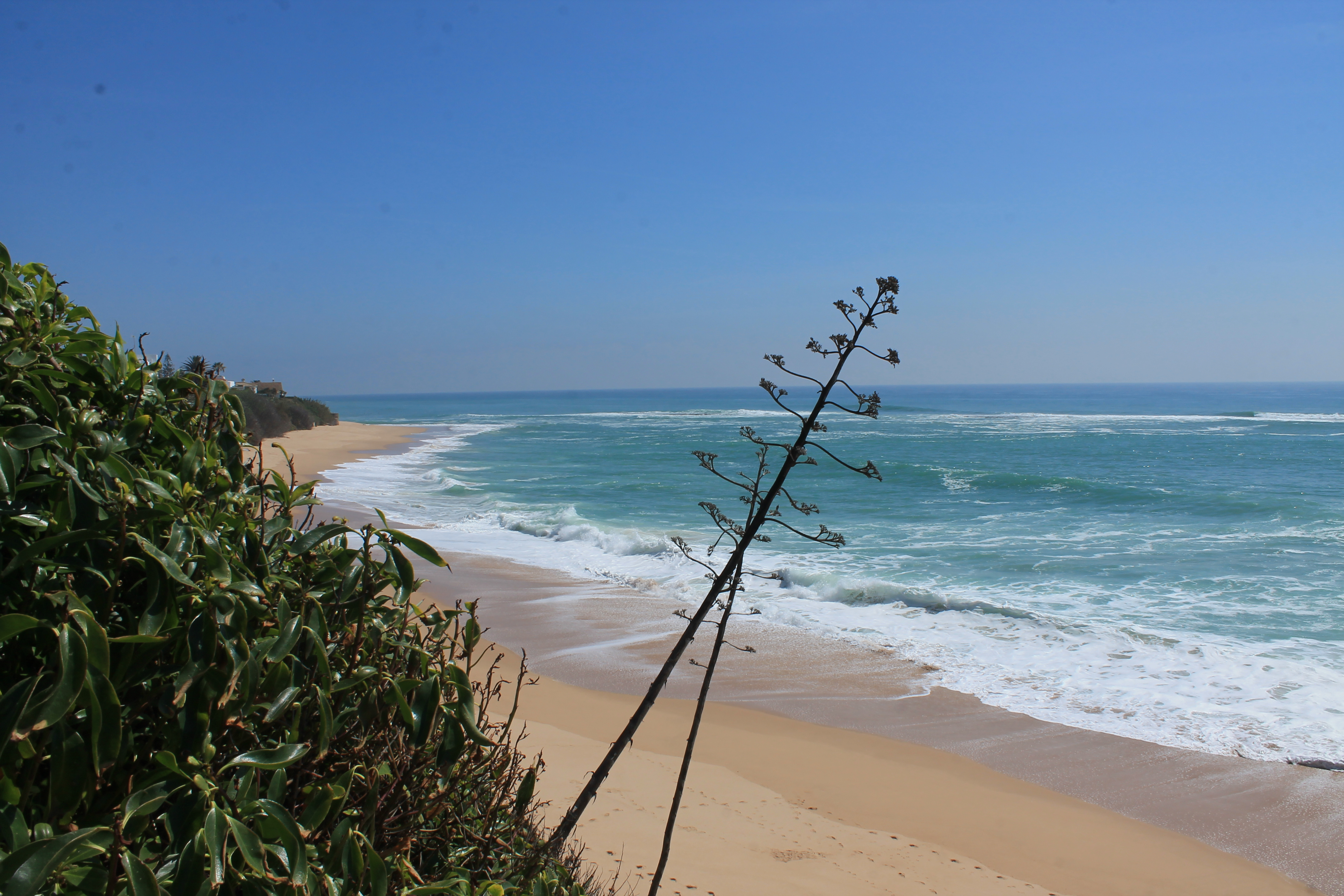

== See also ==
- Barbate
