= Zahara de los Atunes =

- Village
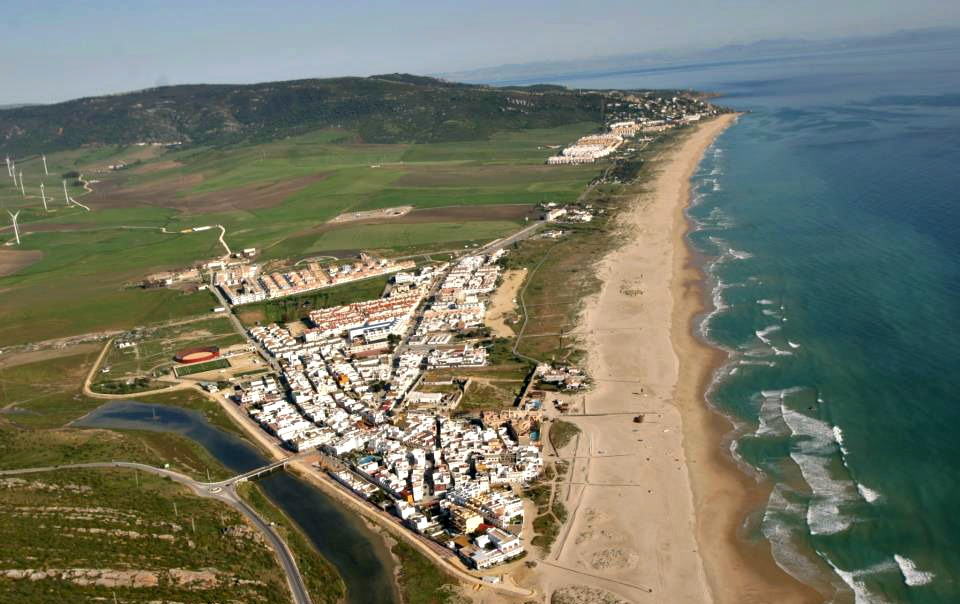
- Zahara de los Atunes

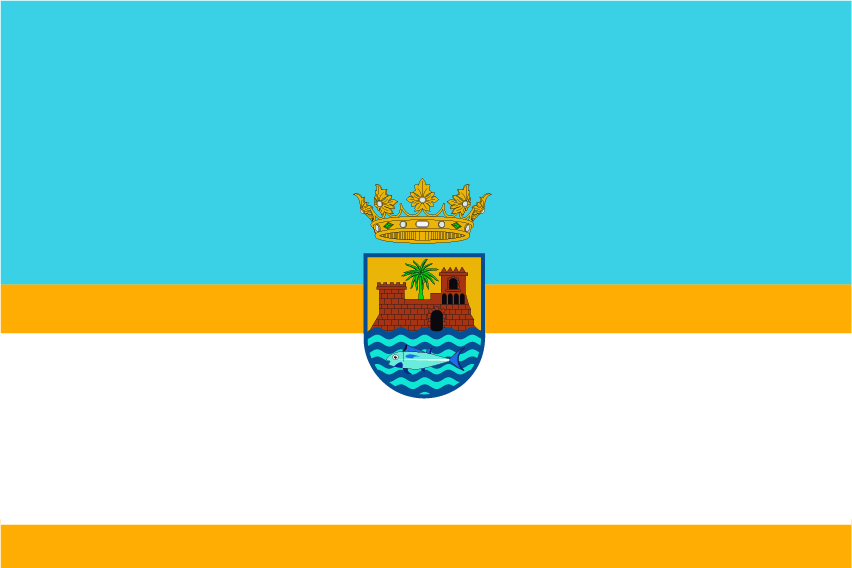
- Flag Coat of arms

- Location in Spain
- Coordinates: 36°08′07″N 5°50′44″W
- Country: Spain
- Autonomous community: Andalusia
- Province: Cádiz
- Comarca: La Janda
- municipality: Barbate
- Elevation: 12 m (39 ft)

Population (2012)
  - Total: 1,200
- Patrons:saint Joseph, Our Lady of Mount Carmel
- Demonym: Zahareños/ Zahareñas
- Time zone: UTC+1 (CET)
  - Summer (DST): UTC+2 (CEST)
- Postal code: 11393
- Dialing code: (+34) 956 43/45

Zahara de los Atunes is a village on the Costa de la Luz of Spain in the province of Cádiz and the autonomous region of Andalusia. It is noted for its excellent beaches, an outdoor cinema, and la Iglesia Del Carmen church where, curiously, tuna (caught in Almadraba traps) were butchered and salted. Also in the town are excellent facilities including a variety of restaurants, cafes and hotels.

The village is also widely regarded in Spanish music circles thanks to a tradition of live music being played throughout the summer in its 'chiringuitos', or beach bars. Live music has been an important characteristic of Zahara de los Atunes, and the summer months still see a wide variety of popular Spanish artists performing in its beach bars amongst the sand-dunes.

It is located 73 kilometers south of the provincial capital, Cádiz or 177 miles south of Seville and 40 miles west of Gibraltar. The village is bordered to the south by the municipality of Tarifa and to the north by Barbate.

== Etymology ==
Arnald Steiger, author of a Spanish work entitled "Contribution to the phonetics of Spanish-Arabic and Arabic expressions in the Iberian Romanesque and Sicilian language" says that the name comes from the Arabic which is also documented in ancient Portuguese sáfaro, meaning rough, barren or rocky ground, which in old Spanish is çafara.

Wilhelm Giese' documents confirm this etymology and adds that in Andalusian Arabic the meaning is barren desert (as is the ancient Portuguese form derived from it, would tend to confirm). In Alpujarra, in the municipality of Trevélez, the adjective for bush or scrub is 'zahareña and in Granada, one of the roughest routes to Sierra Nevada bears the name 'Zahareña'.

== History ==
The roots of the settlement date back to the time of the Phoenicians, although until the sixteenth century it was simply a fishing village specialized in trapping tuna (as its name suggests) as one of the most important tuna traps of Andalucia were here. Tuna trapping is a traditional art practiced since at least the Roman rule.

The earliest document which the name of Zahara is found is probably the treaty of accommodation between Vejer and Tarifa dated 1444 AD. The settlement was established following the granting of a licence to extract tuna granted to Guzman el Bueno. This privilege still belongs to his descendants, the Dukes of Medina Sidonia, who own the tuna-trap of Zahara.

Following the granting of this licence, in the first half of the fifteenth century, the family built the Castle of Zahara de los Atunes and Palace of Jadraza. The Palace served three functions: as a fortified castle to protect against Barbary pirates, a residential palace during the Tuna Season and a processing plant to deal with the tuna.

In the early sixteenth century, due to good tuna harvests, Zahara began to be permanently populated by merchants, soldiers and tuna fishermen, who cut 'poached' fish in the privacy of the church.

== Geography ==
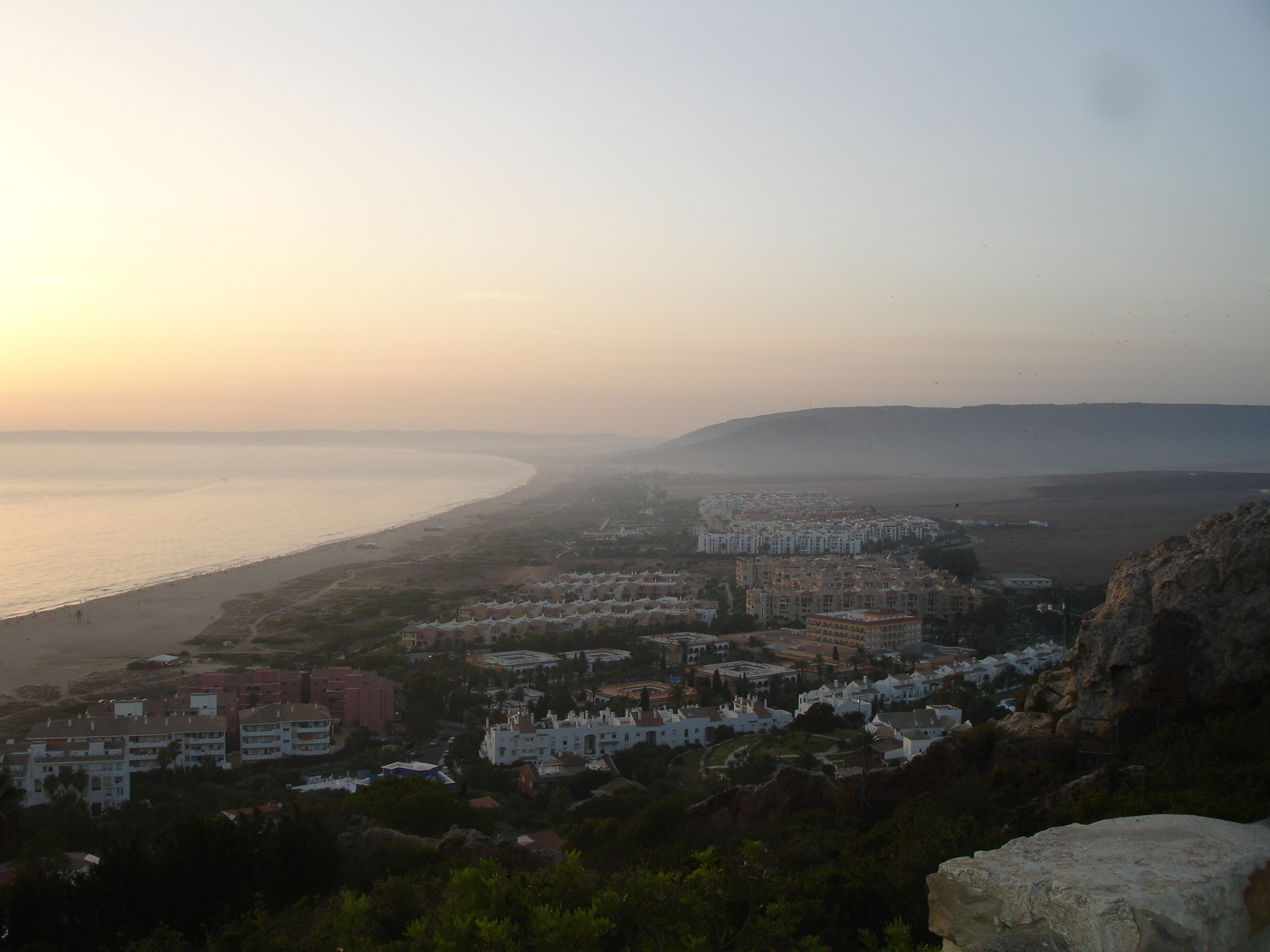
Sunset in Zahara de los Atunes

To the south of the province of Cádiz and located on a plain by the sea, Zahara de los Atunes is surrounded by a series of hills belonging to the Sierra del Retín and the Sierra de la Plata. The locality limits to the south with the municipality of Tarifa, and to the north with Barbate.

The climate of Zahara is the oceanic Mediterranean of the Atlantic coast. This is characterized by mild winters, whose temperatures are always above 10º, and mild summers, which average temperatures are around 25º. Only in exceptional moments have they exceeded 40º of maximum temperature.

The presence of the Atlantic Ocean and the confluence of maritime and continental air masses, propitiate an increase in the annual volume of precipitations, which oscillate between 500 and 600 mm annually. It is also remarkable the high insolation, being able to overcome the 3000 annual hours of sun. Due to its location near the Strait of Gibraltar, the impact of winds and storms are frequent, between the months of autumn to spring dominate the winds with SE component and during the summer the winds with component S or SW.

The zahareño coastline, of about 1600 meters, extends from Zahara to Cabo de Plata10 (Tarifa). It is one of the stretches with the greatest free length of the urban pressure of the Andalusian coasts, due to the occupation of part of the coastal strip by the environmental protections and the incidence of the strong east winds, which finally, have been limiting factors to the developing. The sea water in this area is characterized by being a mass of water of marked oligotrophy, high transparency, well oxygenated and with efficient mixing phenomena.
