= Barbate =

- Municipality
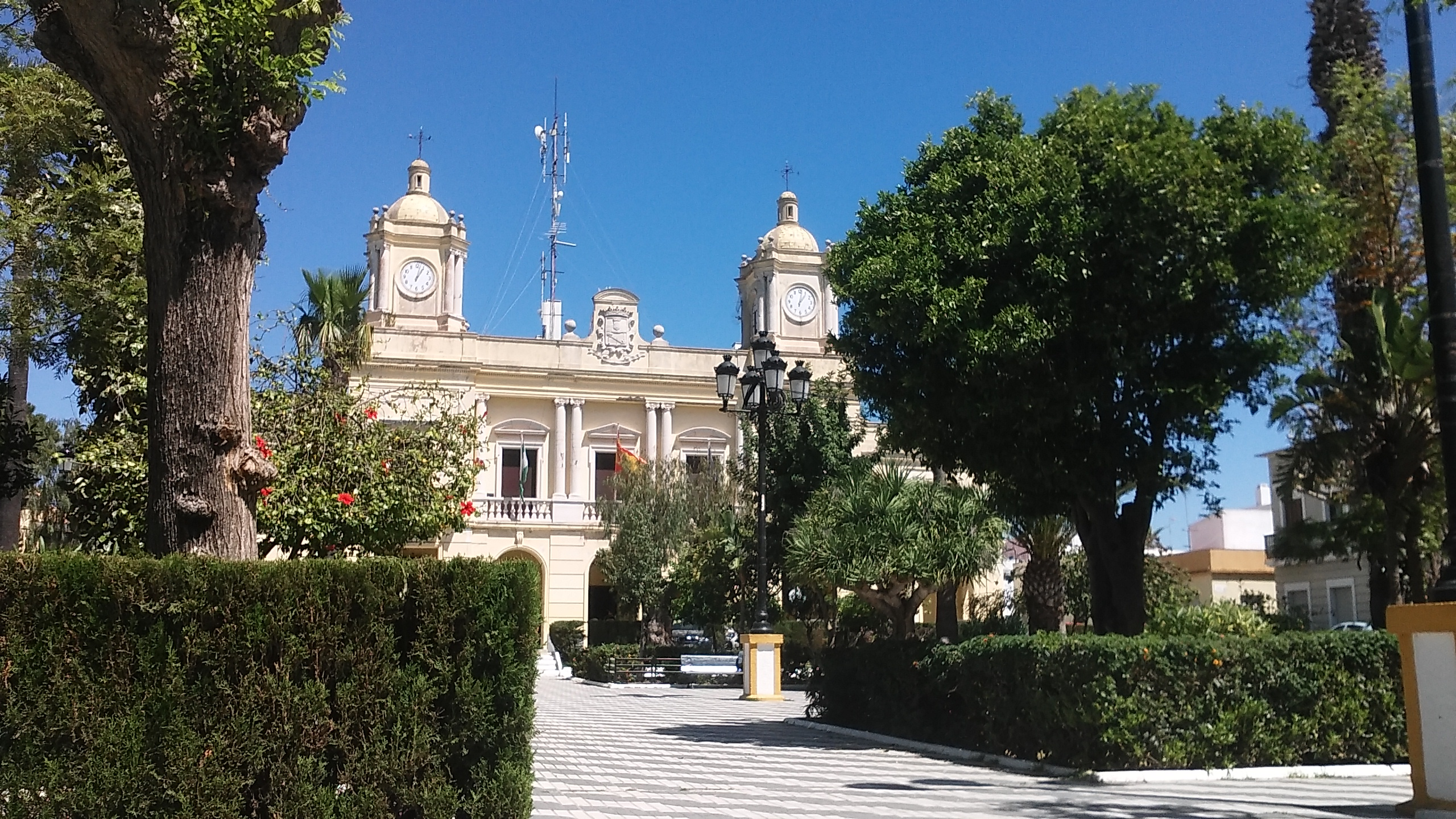
- Town hall

- Flag Coat of arms

- Location in Spain Barbate (Andalusia)
- Coordinates: 36°11′N 5°55′W
- Country: Spain
- Autonomous community: Andalucía
- Province: Cádiz

Government
  - Mayor: Miguel Molina (AxSí)

Area
  - Total: 142.17 km^{2} (54.89 sq mi)
- Elevation: 14 m (46 ft)

Population (2025-01-01)
  - Total: 22,635
  - Density: 159.21/km^{2} (412.35/sq mi)
- Demonym(s): Barbateño, -a
- Time zone: UTC+1 (CET)
  - Summer (DST): UTC+2 (CEST)
- Postal code: 11160
- Website: barbate.es

Barbate is a Spanish municipality in the Province of Cádiz, in the autonomous community of Andalusia. It is a coastal town located on the shores of the Atlantic Ocean, close to the Strait of Gibraltar. Covering a total area of 142.17 km^{2}, it has, as of 2019, a registered population of 22,518.

== Geography ==
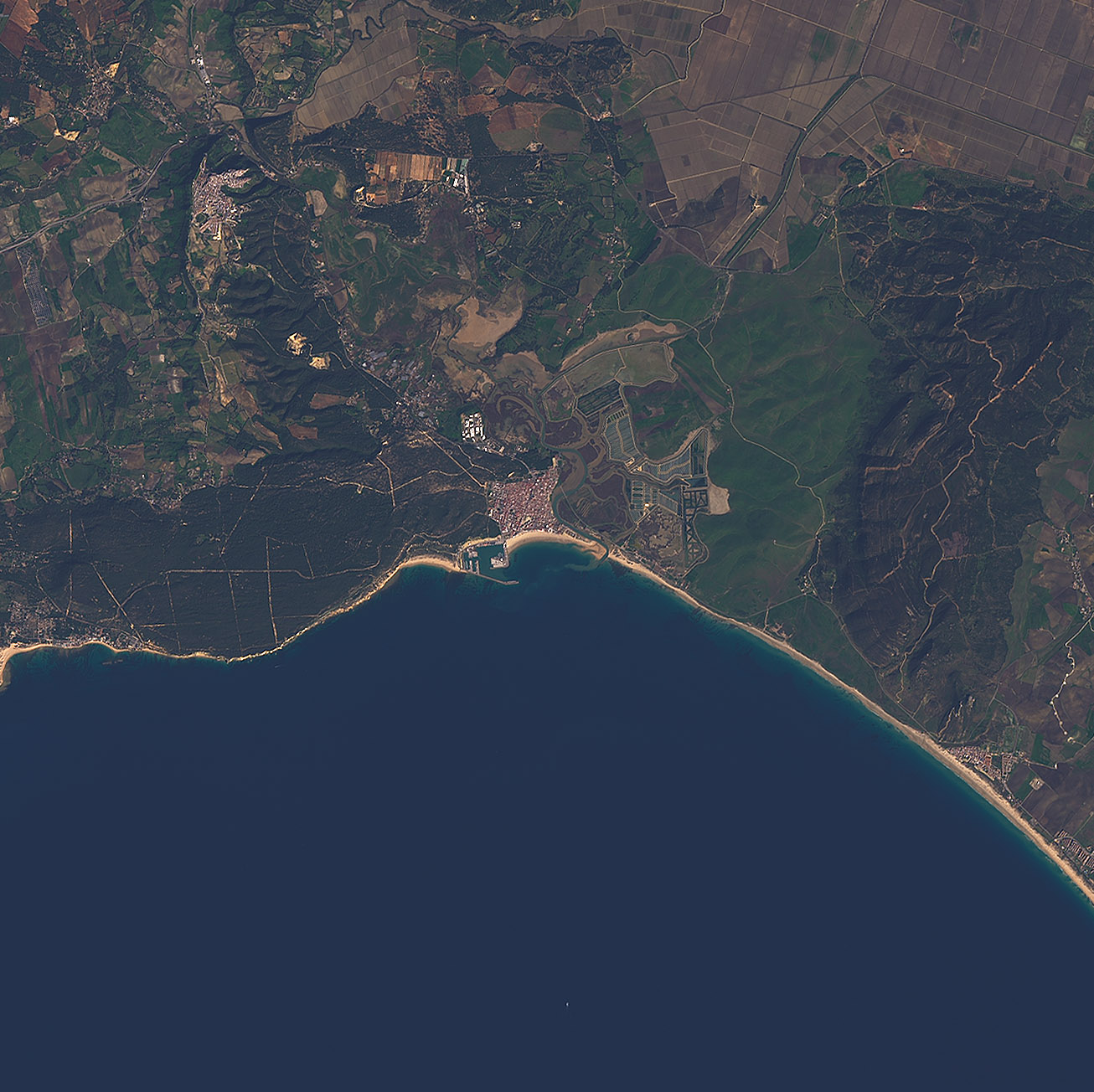
Satellite view centered on Barbate

Barbate is at the mouth of the River Barbate, 11 kilometres (6.8 miles) along the coast east of Cape Trafalgar and within the La Breña y Marismas del Barbate Natural Park.

The "Tómbolo de Trafalgar", a local point of interest, comprises a sandy isthmus joining Cape Trafalgar to the mainland.

It is ascribed to the comarca of La Janda.

== History ==
Barbate has been traditionally identified as the Roman oppidum of Baessipo although there are also recent tentative suggestions about a location of the aforementioned settlement in nearby Vejer de la Frontera.

From the 1930s the town was known as Barbate de Franco because General Francisco Franco spent leisure time there. It ceased to be called this in 1998 after a decree was passed by the Junta de Andalucia.

Barbate has a long history of fishing stretching back to Roman times when fish salting was at its peak. The town has a central square, "Plaza de la Inmaculada", flanked by the Town Hall and the Church of St. Paul. Barbate is popular with Spanish tourists in the summer, but attracts few foreign visitors.

== Fiestas ==
Barbate celebrates several fiestas during the year:

- "Carnival" is celebrated in February or March, usually the week after it is celebrated in Cádiz. A temporary building is erected by the river and during the appointed week there are various dramatic, satirical and musical events. The Six Taps Square (la Plaza de los Seis Grifos) is a particular centre of activity.
- Holy Week is celebrated during the week before Easter with religious processions through the streets starting on Palm Sunday through to Good Friday and Easter Sunday.
- Tuna Gastronomy week has been held since 2008 to celebrate the central role of tuna in the towns economy. It takes the form of a fair with temporary buildings, local trade stands and other attractions
- St John's Night, traditionally on 23 June during the evening, artificial figures of local outstanding people, national celebrities or politicians are burned, it is customary to go down to the beach to cool down after the bonfires.
- St. Carmen's Fair (Feria del Carmen) held on 16 July to celebrate the patron saint of fishermen and the town.
- The Great Sardine Festival (La Gran Sardina) is held in the port area to enjoy the sardine season and its produce.

== Nearby villages ==
- Zahara de los Atunes
- Los Caños de Meca
- Zahora

== Beaches ==
This part of the coast has a number of beaches, among them:

- Mangueta
- Zahora
- Los Caños de Meca
- Hierbabuena
- Nuestra Señora del Carmen
- Cañillos
- Pajares
- Zahara de los Atunes.

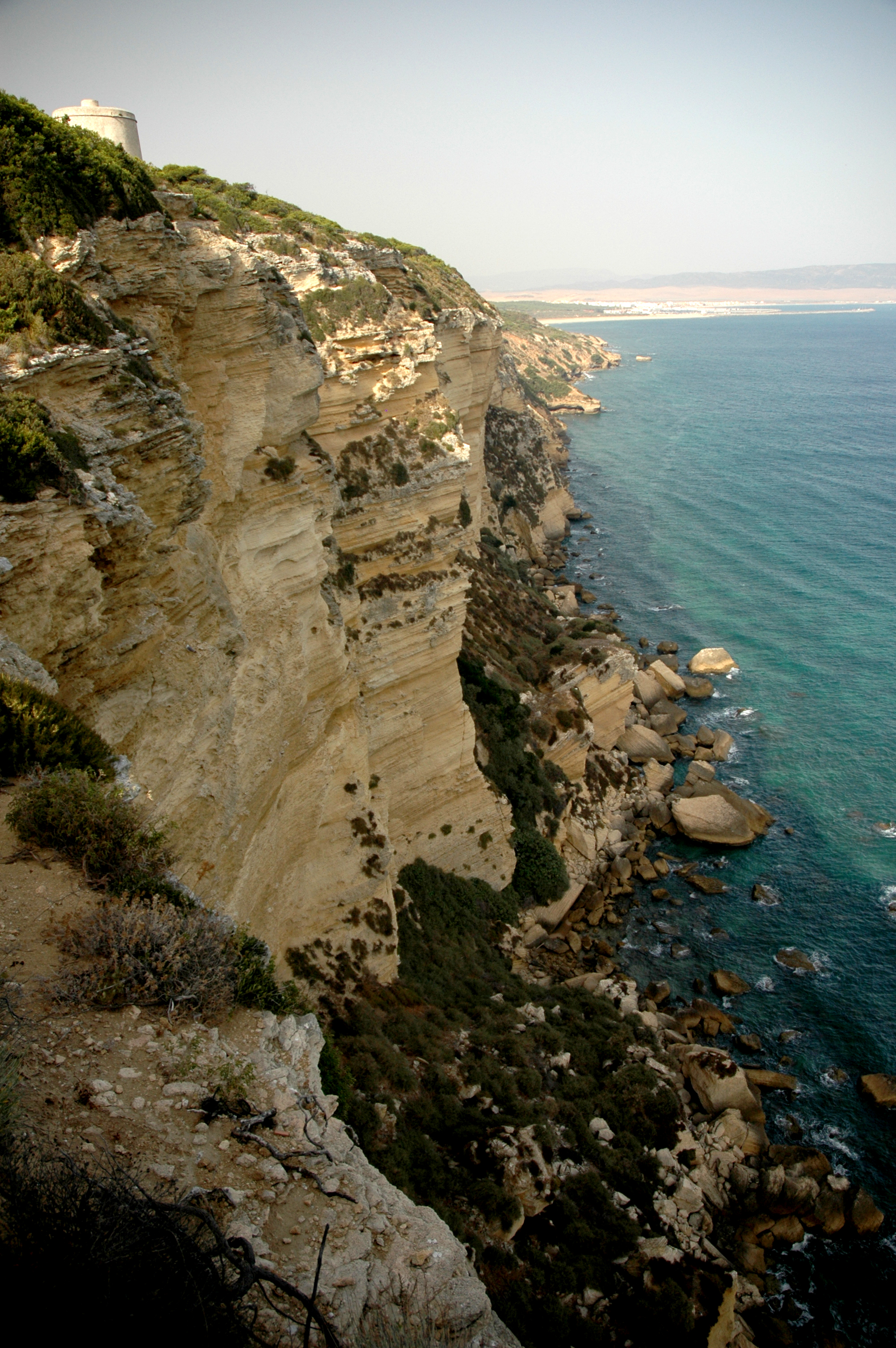
La Breña y Marismas del Barbate Natural Park

== Demographics ==
Historical population
Year	Pop.	±%
1999	24,011	—
2000	24,020	+0.0%
2001	23,914	−0.4%
2002	24,150	+1.0%
2003	24,264	+0.5%
2004	24,444	+0.7%
2005	24,496	+0.2%
Source: INE (Spain)

== Economy ==
The main industries of the economy are fishing, rural tourism and beaches.

== Gallery ==
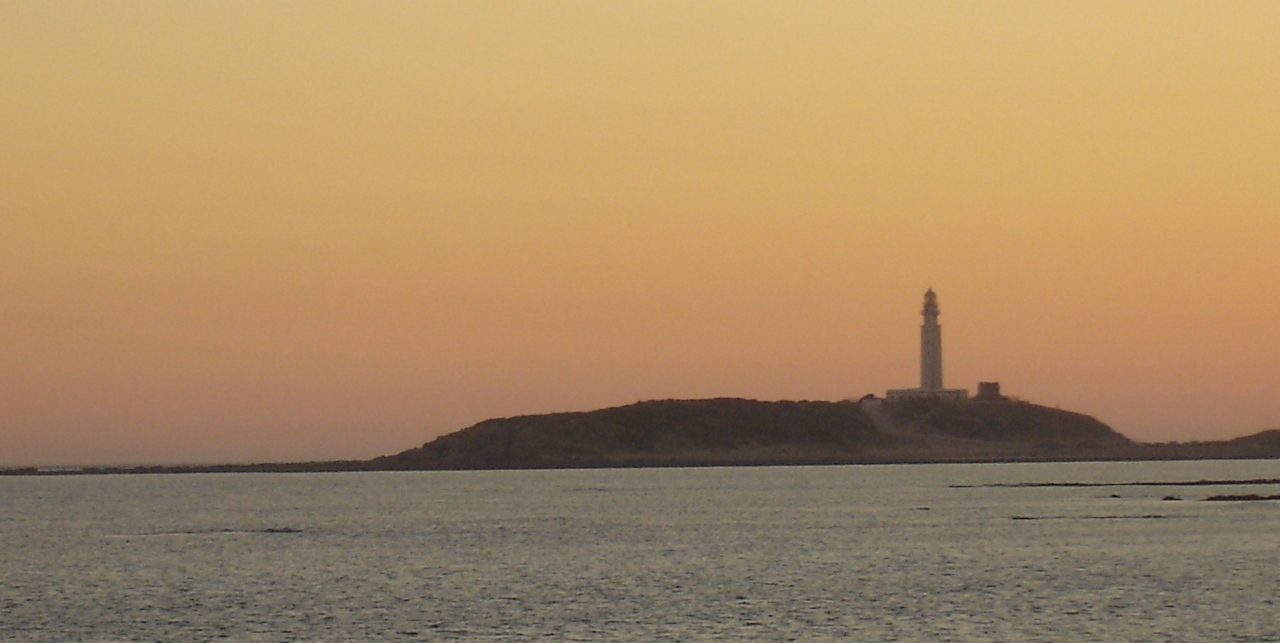
Cabo Trafalgar

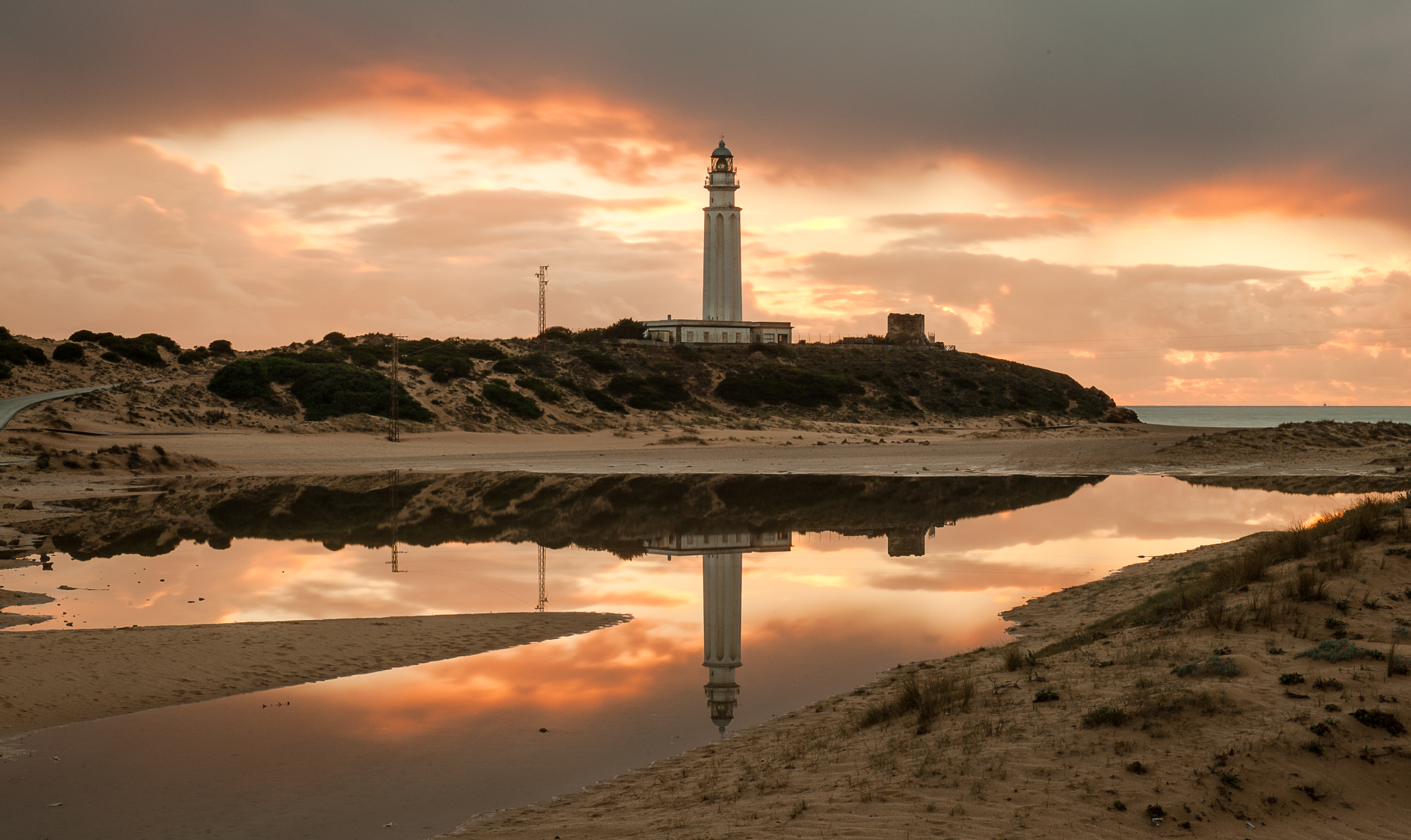
Trafalgar lighthouse

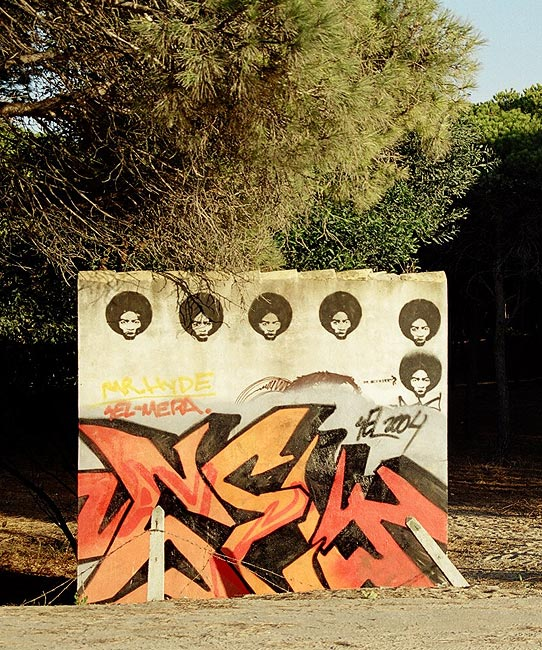
Graffiti in Barbate

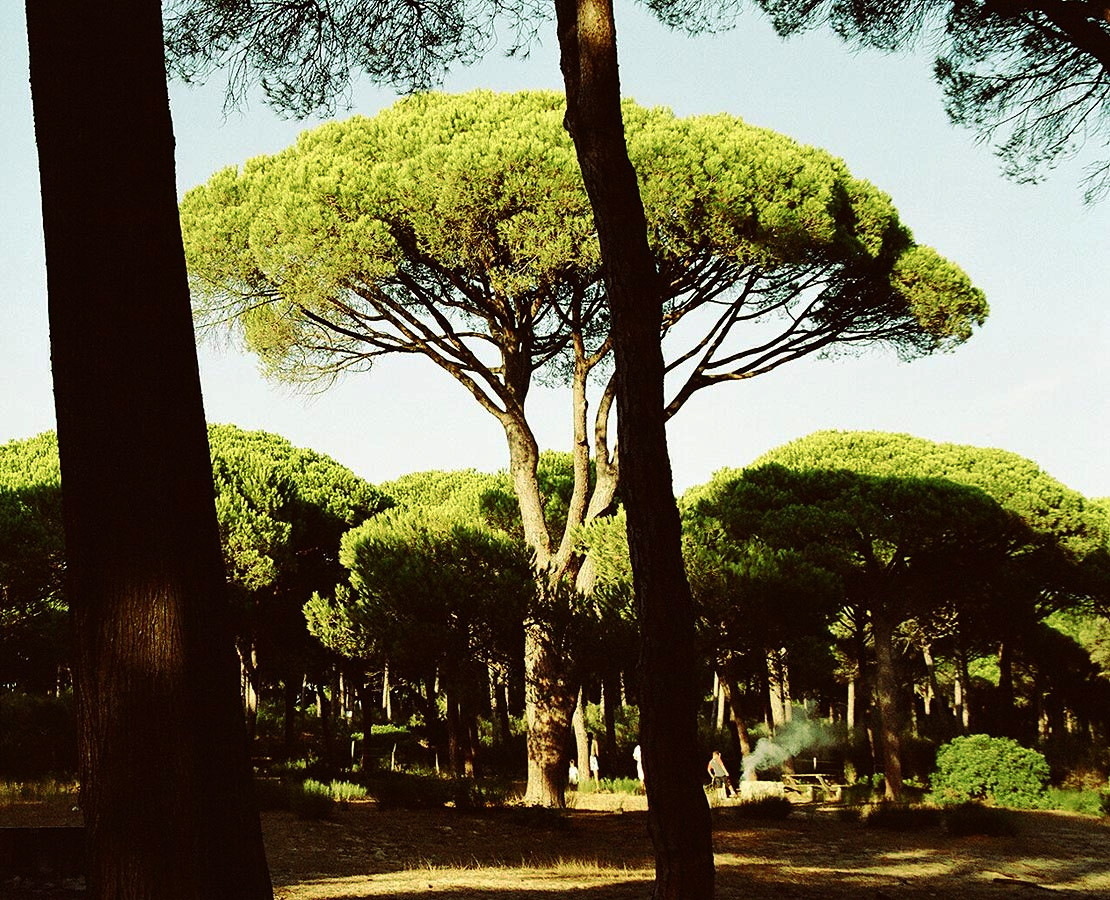
"La Breña"

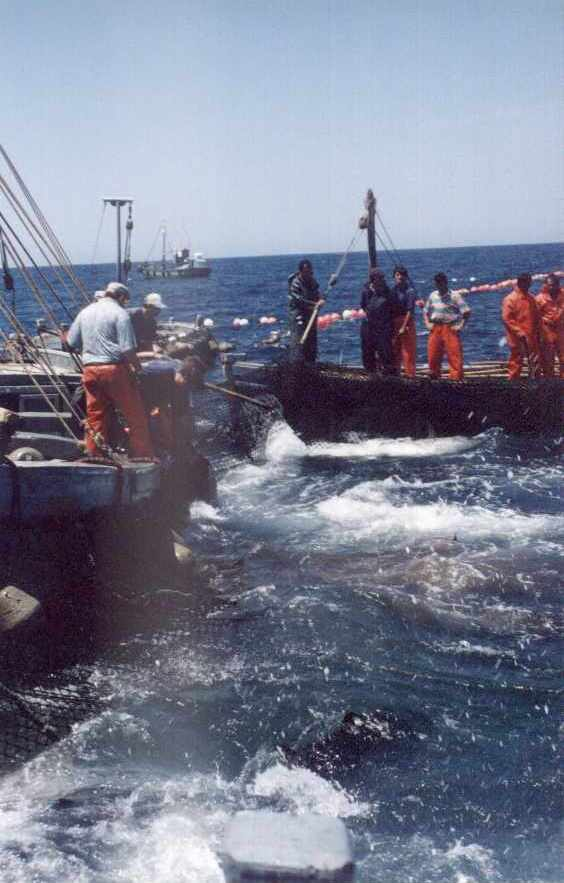
Tuna fishing off Barbate

== See also ==
- List of municipalities in Cádiz
