= List of castles in Spain =

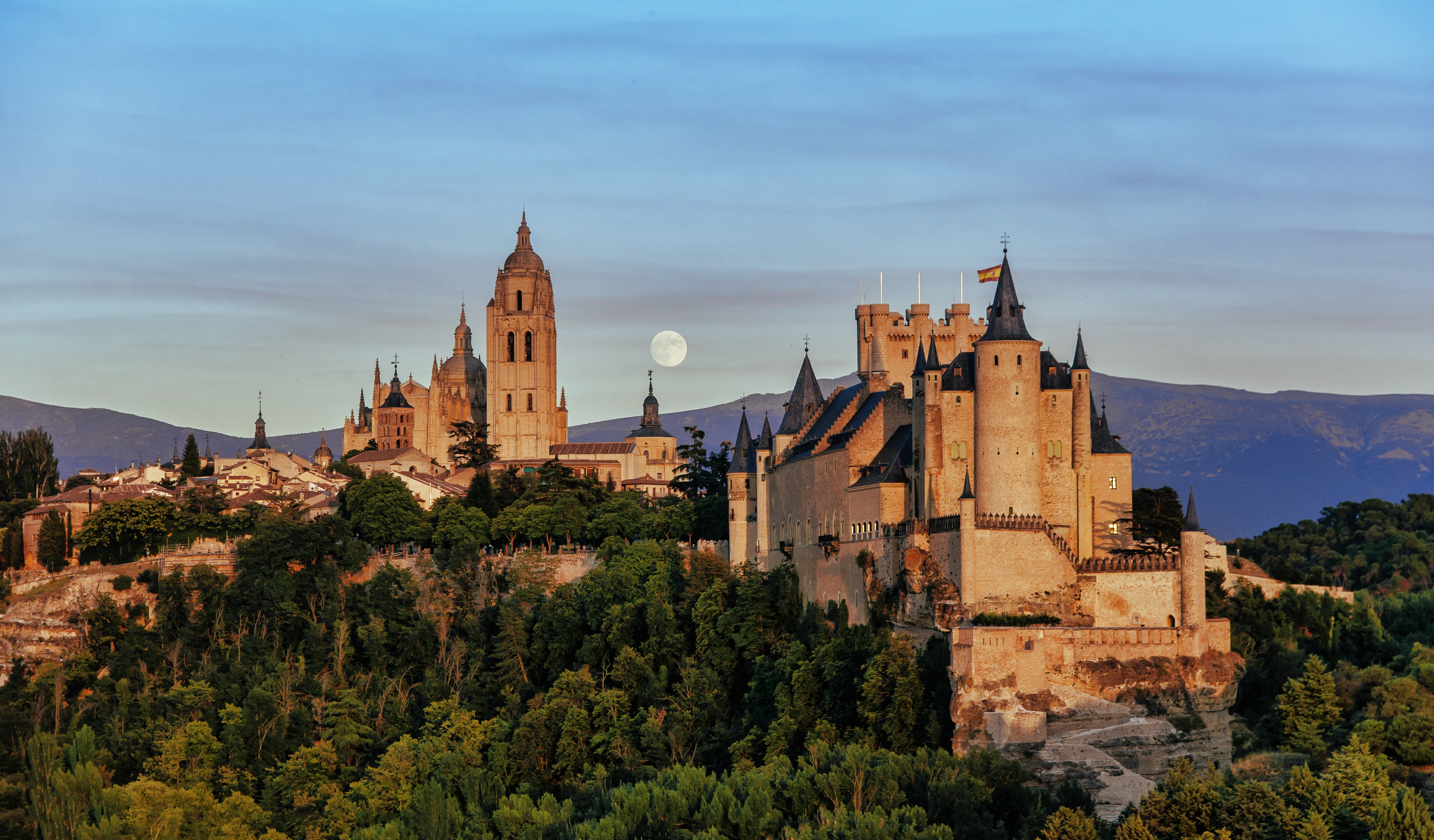
Dating back to the early 12th century, the Alcázar of Segovia is one of the most distinctive medieval castles in Europe. Disney was inspired by this site in building Cinderella's castle.

The castles in Spain were built mainly for the country's defense, particularly with respect to fortification. During the Middle Ages, northern Christian kingdoms had to secure their borders with their Muslim southern neighbours, thus forcing both Christian and Muslim kings to grant border fiefs to their liege noblemen so as to keep and maintain defensive fortresses. When the Reconquista advanced, those border castles lost their initial purpose, and, as in the rest of medieval Europe, they were used as noble residences and fief-keeps. Sporadic threats of war maintained their initial military purposes as enemy invasions were common. In some locations, such as the Basque country, fiefdoms did not exist as such, and noble families could not afford nor did they need huge fortresses, giving rise to many tower houses. In Muslim Spain many castle-palaces were built: the petty taifa kingdoms that arose after the fall of the Caliphate of Córdoba were militarily weak thus castles began taking on a more aesthetic purpose. During the late Middle Ages, Christian kingdoms had secured and enriched themselves well enough to support a more courtly lifestyle, so more residential castles were built, such as the Alcázar of Segovia, which was used as the main residence of the kings of Castile, whereas the Castle of Olite, built in a luxurious gothic style, was the seat of the Kingdom of Navarre's royal court.

After the Conquest of Granada in 1492, the Catholic monarchs ordered all the castles in their realms to be handed over to the Crown. Although the order was not completely carried out, the War of the Germanias, a rebellion against king Charles V in the early 16th century, forced the new Spanish Habsburg dynasty to continue the process, and many castles were demolished as well. Most of the castles in Spain were successively abandoned and dismantled, Spanish kings fearing noble and peasant revolts, especially in the newly conquered lands. Accordingly, some of them are nowadays in a state of decay, and although some restoration work has been done, the number of former castles is so large that the Spanish government lacks both the resources and the will to restore them all.

== Andalucía ==
=== Almería ===
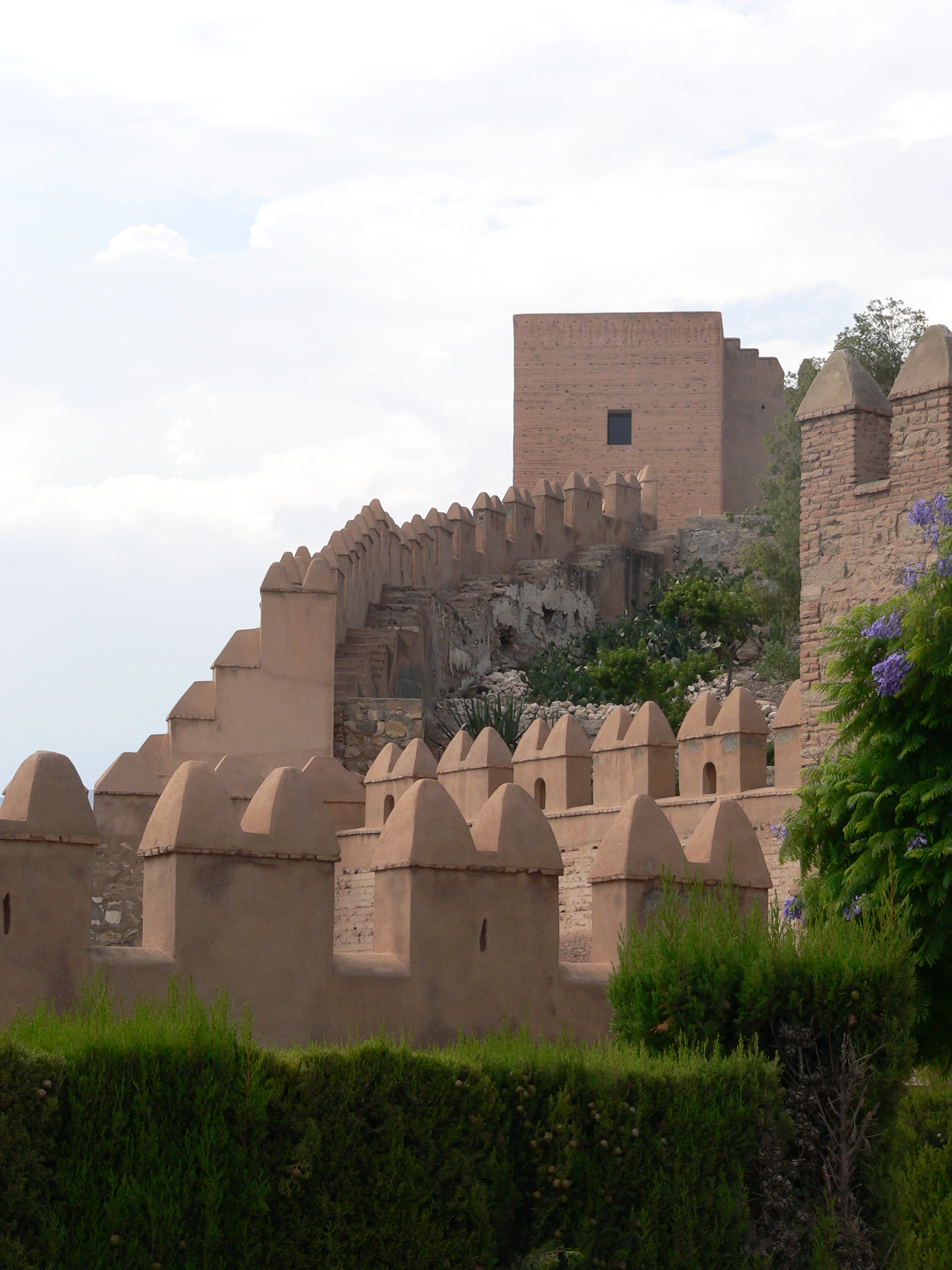
Alcazaba of Almería

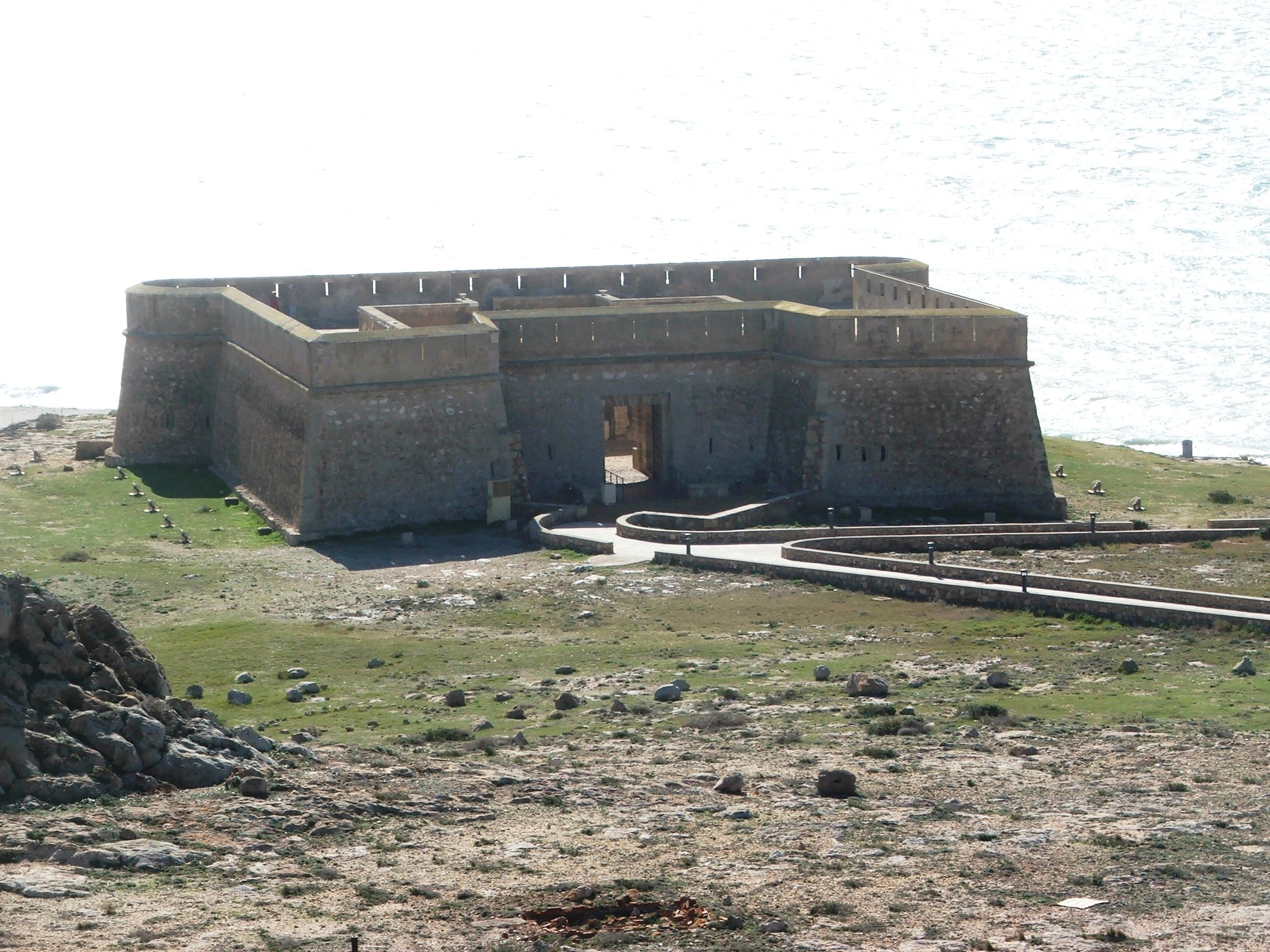
Battery of Guardias Viejas

- Alcazaba of Almería
- Castle of San Pedro
- Castle of Cuevas del Almanzora
- Castle of Gérgal
- Castle of Huebro
- Castle of San Cristóbal (Almería)
- Castle of San Juan de los Terreros
- Castle of Tabernas
- Castle of Vélez-Blanco
- Castle of the Peñón de las Juntas, Abla
- Casa Fuerte de la Cruceta
- El Castillejo (Abrucena), Abrucena
- Battery of Guardias Viejas
- Battery of San Felipe
- Battery of San Ramón
- Castle of Santa Ana
- Atalaya of San Miguel (Almería)
- Atalaya of the Perdigal, Almería
- Tower of Cárdenas
- Tower García
- Tower of la Garrofa (Almería)
- Tower of Macenas
- Tower of Medala (Tahal)
- Tower of la Vela Blanca, Níjar
- Houses Forts (Almería)
- Walls of Adra
- Caliphate Walls of Almería
- Castillo de las Escobetas, Garrucha

=== Cádiz ===
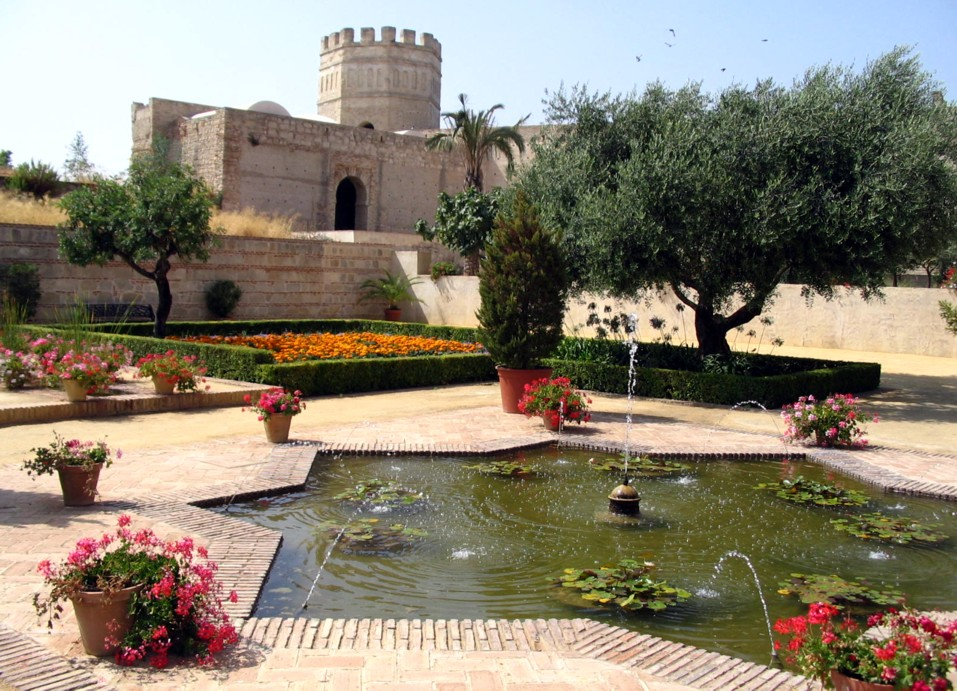
Alcázar of Jerez de la Frontera

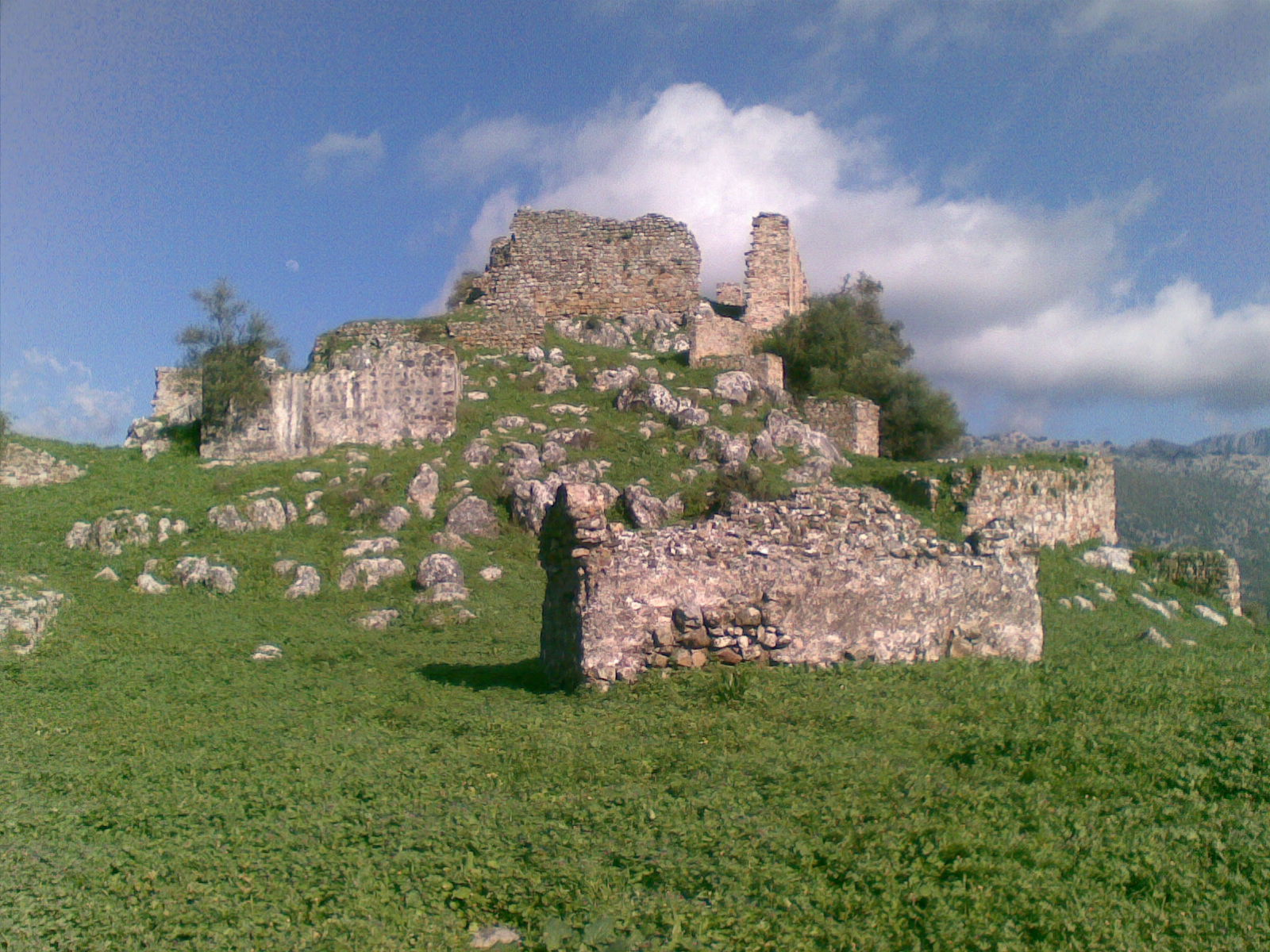
Castle of Aznalmara

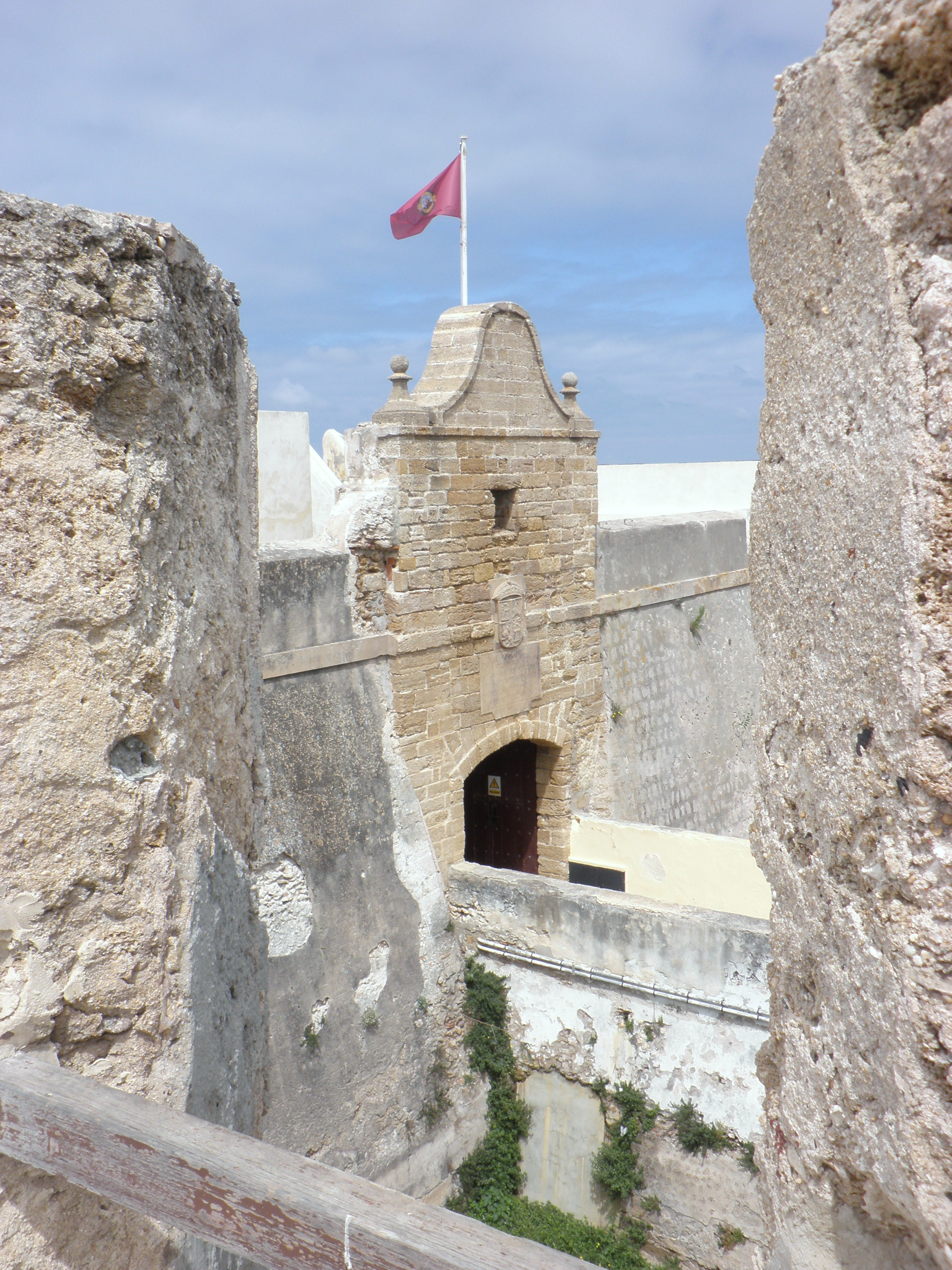
Castle of Santa Catalina (Cádiz)

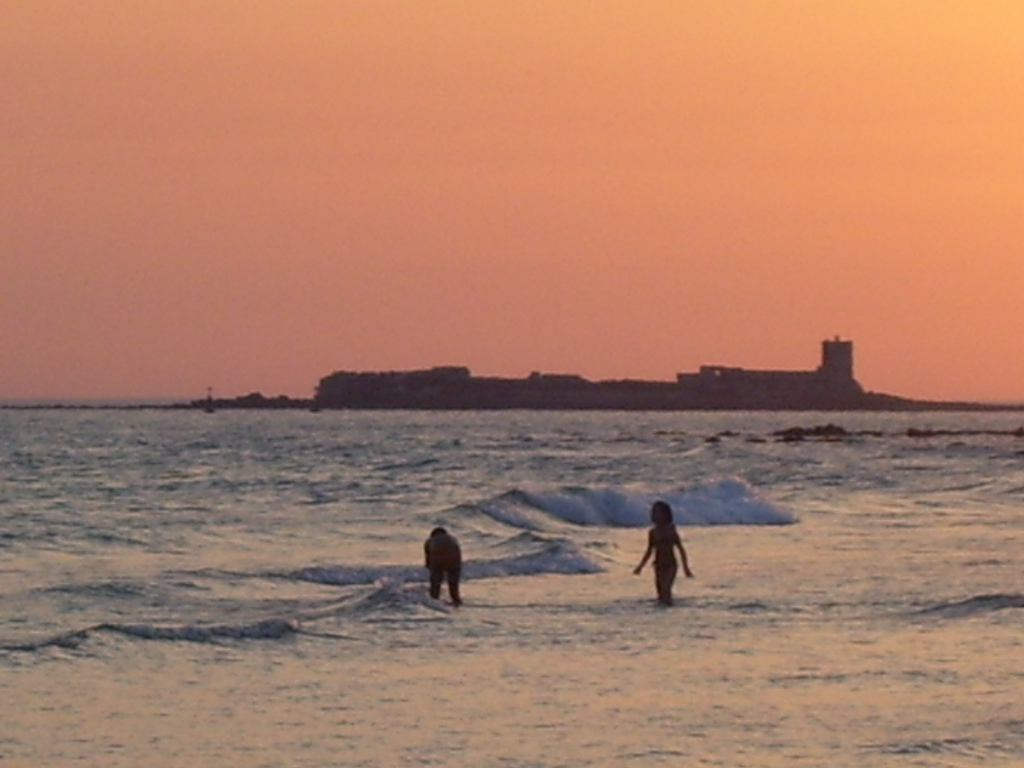
Castle of Sancti Petri

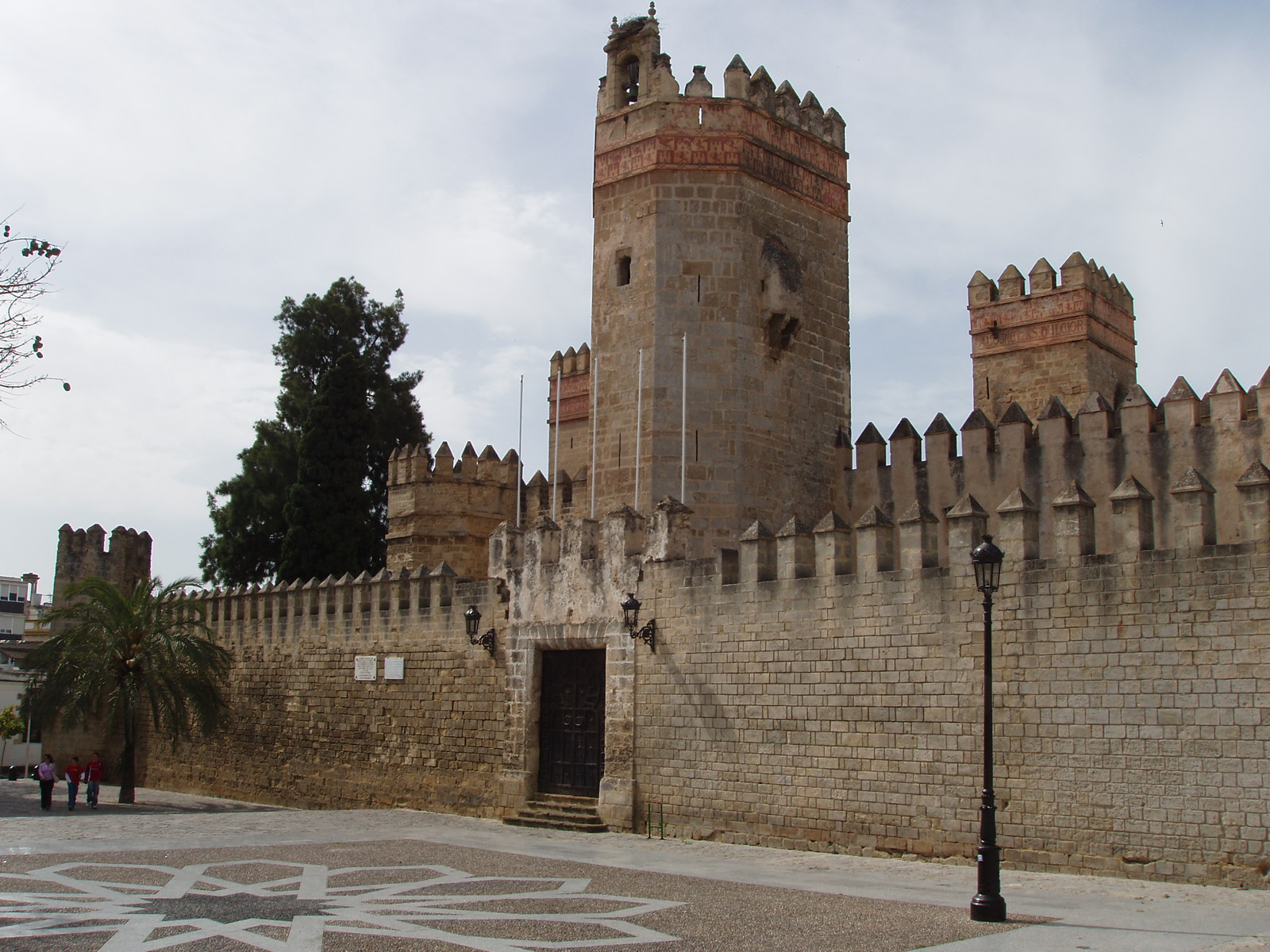
Castle of San Marcos

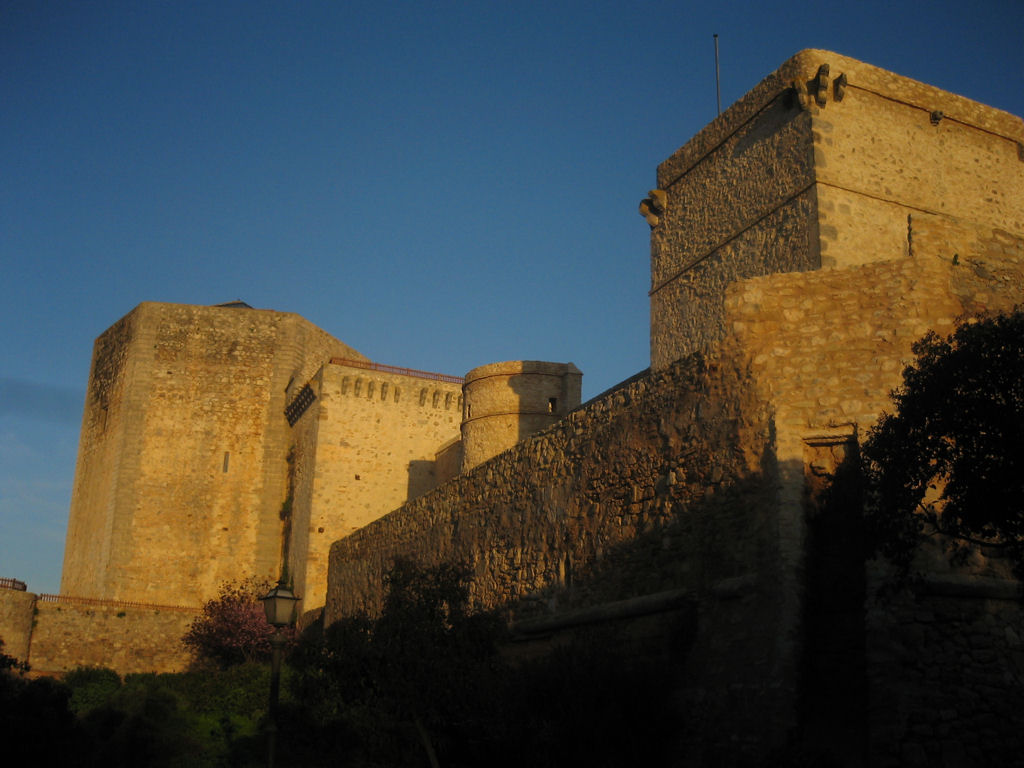
Castle of Santiago

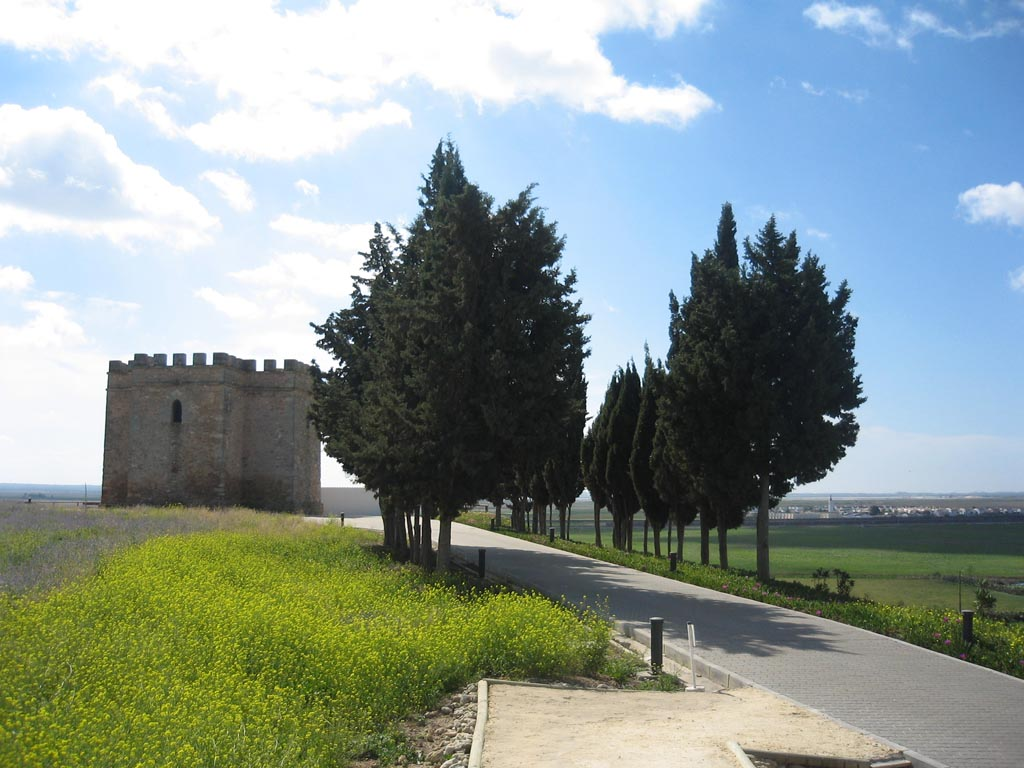
Castle of Doña Blanca

- Alcázar of Jerez de la Frontera
- Caliphate Alcazaba of Tarifa
- Castle of Aznalmara
- Castle of Berroquejo
- Castle del Espíritu Santo
- Castle of Gigonza
- Castle of Melgarejo
- Castle of Santa Catalina (Cádiz)
- Castle of San Sebastián (Cádiz)
- Castle of Sancti Petri
- Castle of San Romualdo
- Castle of San Marcos (El Puerto de Santa María)
- Castle of Guzmán el Bueno
- Castle of Tarifa
- Castle of Zahara de la Sierra
- Castle of Zahara de los Atunes
- Castle of Jimena de la Frontera
- Castle of Alcalá de los Gazules
- Castle of Bornos
- Castle of Olvera
- Castle of Carastas
- Castle of Setenil de las Bodegas
- Castle of Arcos de la Frontera
- Castle of Benaocaz
- Castle of San Lorenzo del Puntal
- Castle del Puntal
- Castle of Conil de la Frontera
- Castle of La Cortadura
- Castle of Vejer de la Frontera
- Castle of Ben Alud
- Castle of Luna (Rota)
- Castle of Torre-Alháquime
- Castle of Fátima (Ubrique)
- Castle of Matrera (Villamartín)
- Castle of Berroquejo (Jerez de la Frontera)
- Castle of Torrestrella
- Castle Fortress of Tempul (Algar)
- Castle of Santiago (Sanlúcar de Barrameda)
- Castle of Medina-Sidonia
- Castle of Algeciras
- Castle del Lirio (Chiclana de la Frontera)
- Castle of Carteia (San Roque)
- Castle of Fatetar
- Castle of Doña Blanca
- Castle of Gibalbín
- Castle of Jimena
- Castle of Castellar de la Frontera
- Fort of San Luis
- Battery of Aspiroz
- Battery of San Genís
- Battery of Urrutia
- Battery of Zuazo
- Tower del Almirante
- Tower Alta
- Walls of Jerez del Frontera

=== Córdoba ===
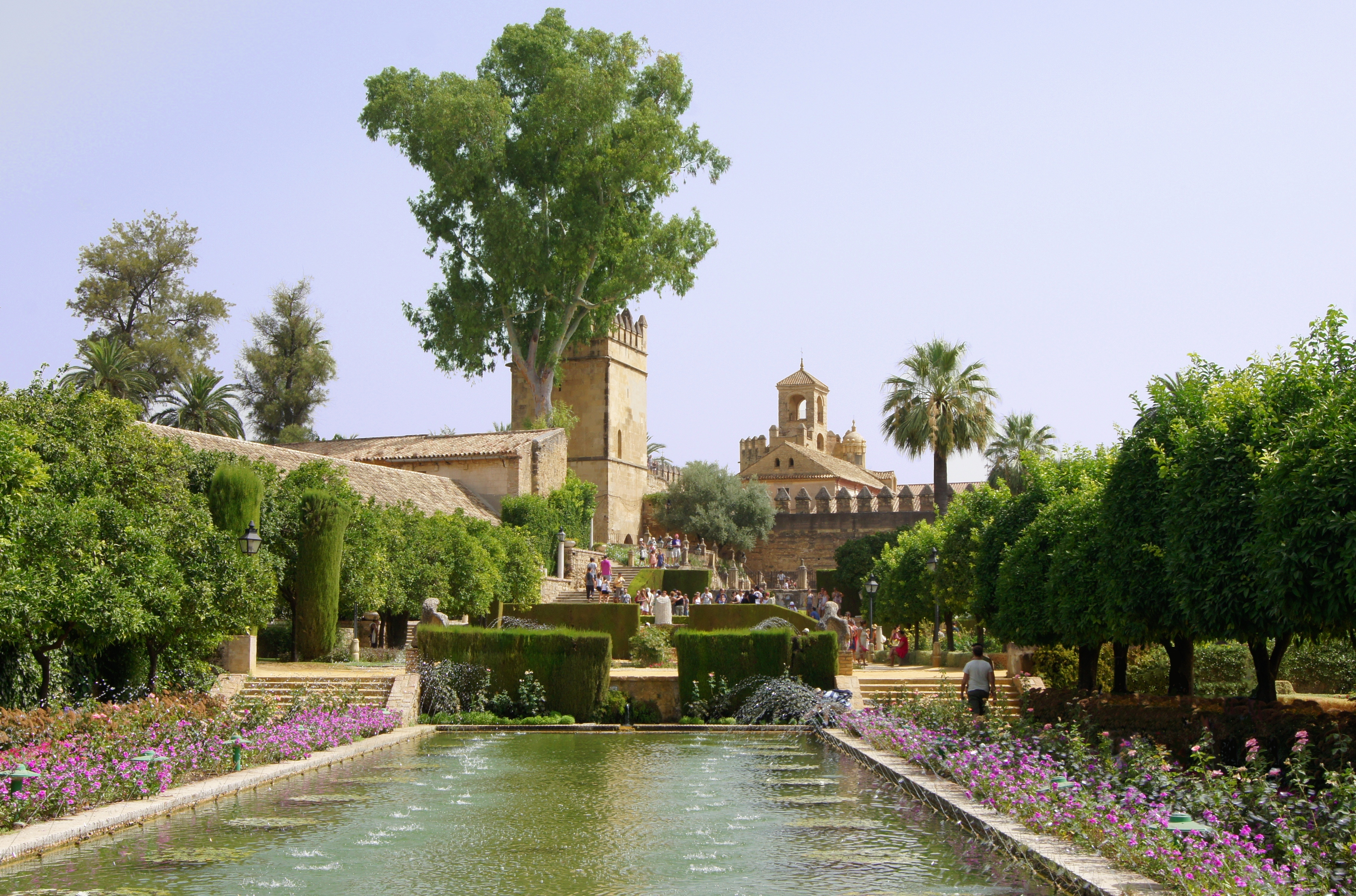
Alcázar de los Reyes Cristianos

- Alcázar de los Reyes Cristianos (Alcázar of the Christian Monarchs)
- Castle of Almodóvar del Río
- Castle of Belalcázar
- Castle of Belmez
- Castle of Bujalance
- Castle of Almodóvar del Río
- Castle of los Sotomayor Zúñiga y Madroñiz (Belalcázar)
- Castle of Belmez
- Castle of Espejo
- Castle of Iznájar
- Castle of Torreparedones
- Castle of Zuheros
- Tower of Arias Cabrera
- Tower albarrana

=== Granada ===
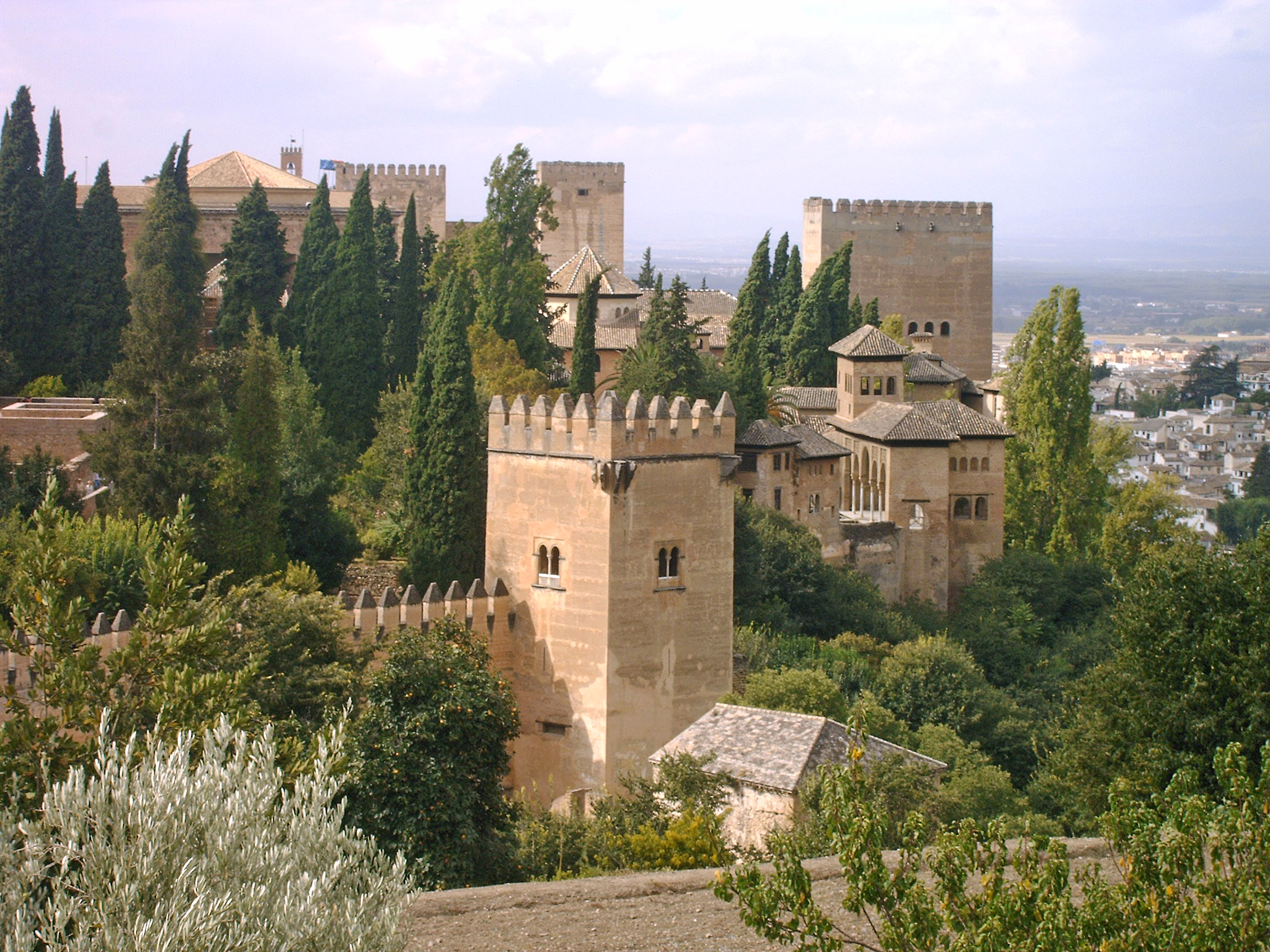
The Alhambra of Granada.

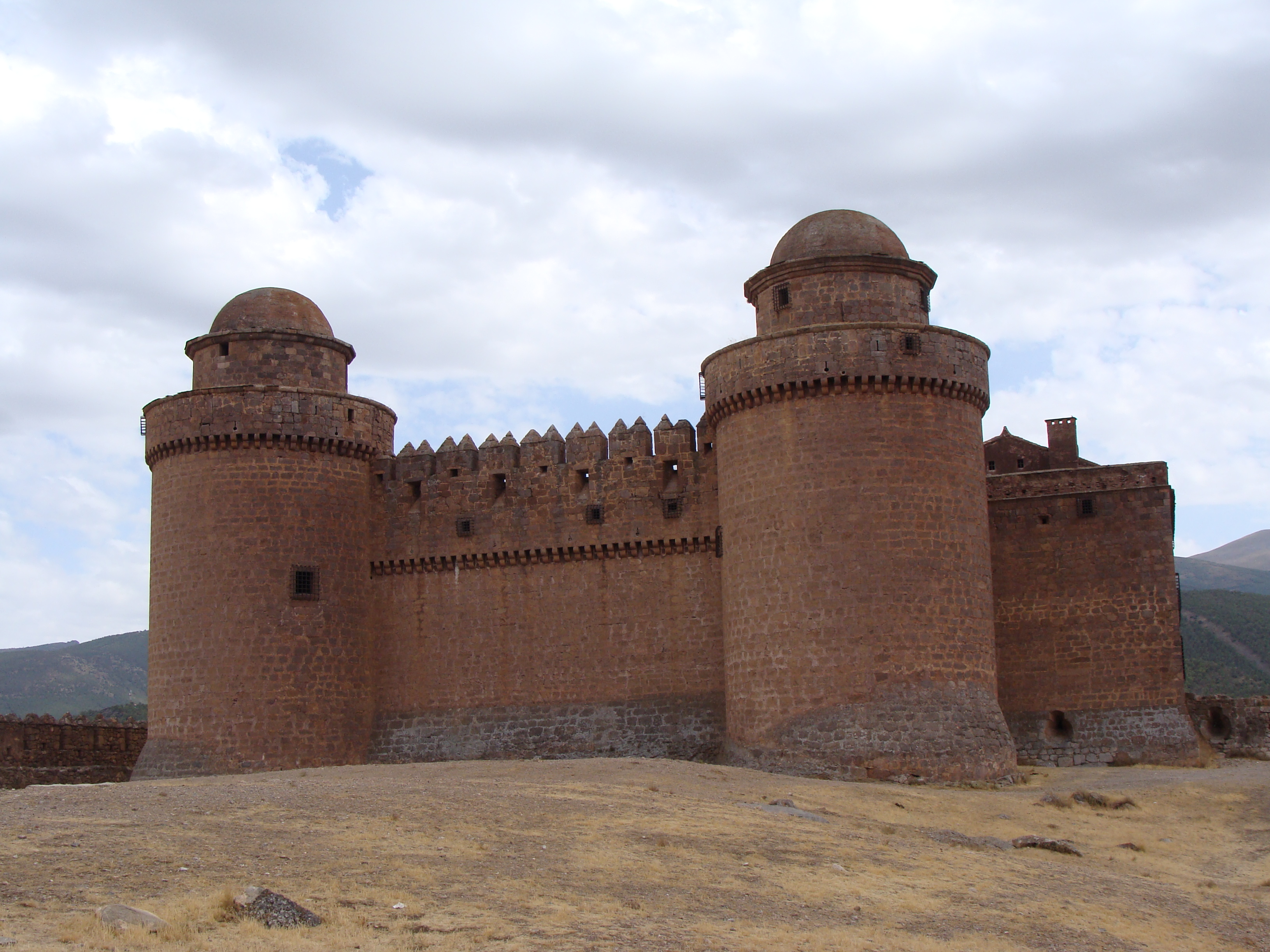
Castle of La Calahorra

- Alhambra
- Alcazaba of Loja
- Alcazaba of Salobreña
- Alcazaba of Guadix
- Alcazaba of Baza
- Castle of La Calahorra
- Castle of Almuñécar
- El Castillejo (Los Guájares)
- Castle of Píñar
- Castle of Láchar
- Castle of Montefrío
- Castle of Moclín
- Castle of Iznalloz
- Castle of Illora
- Castle of Lanjarón
- Castle of Chite
- Castle of Dúrcal
- Castle of Lojuela
- Castle of Mondújar
- Castle of Restábal
- Fort of Juviles
- Atalaya of la Sierra del Muerto
- Atalaya of Sierra Bermeja
- Atalaya of Sierra Encantada
- Atalaya of the Campo-Botardo
- Atalaya of la Mesa
- Atalaya of la Porqueriza
- Atalaya of La Solana
- Atalaya of la Cantera de Valentín
- Atalaya of Cónchar
- Atalaya de Saleres
- Torreón of Huétor
- Towers Bermejas
- Tower atalaya of Mingoandrés
- Tower of la Gallina
- Tower of Marchena
- Tower del Tío Bayo
- Tower atalaya del Cautor
- Tower of la Rijana
- Silla del Moro
- Other castles in the municipality of Motril and Gualchos

=== Huelva ===
- Alfayat of la Peña
- Castle of Almonaster la Real
- Castle of Aracena
- Castle of Aroche
- Castle of Ayamonte
- Castle of Cortegana
- Castle of Cumbres Mayores
- Castle fortress of Los Zúñiga (Cartaya)
- Castle of Gibraleón
- Castle of Moguer
- Castle of los Guzmanes (Niebla)
- Castle of Paymogo
- Castle of San Pedro de Huelva
- Castle of Sanlúcar de Guadiana
- Castle of Santa Olalla del Cala
- Tower del Catalán
- Tower de Isla Canela

=== Jaén ===
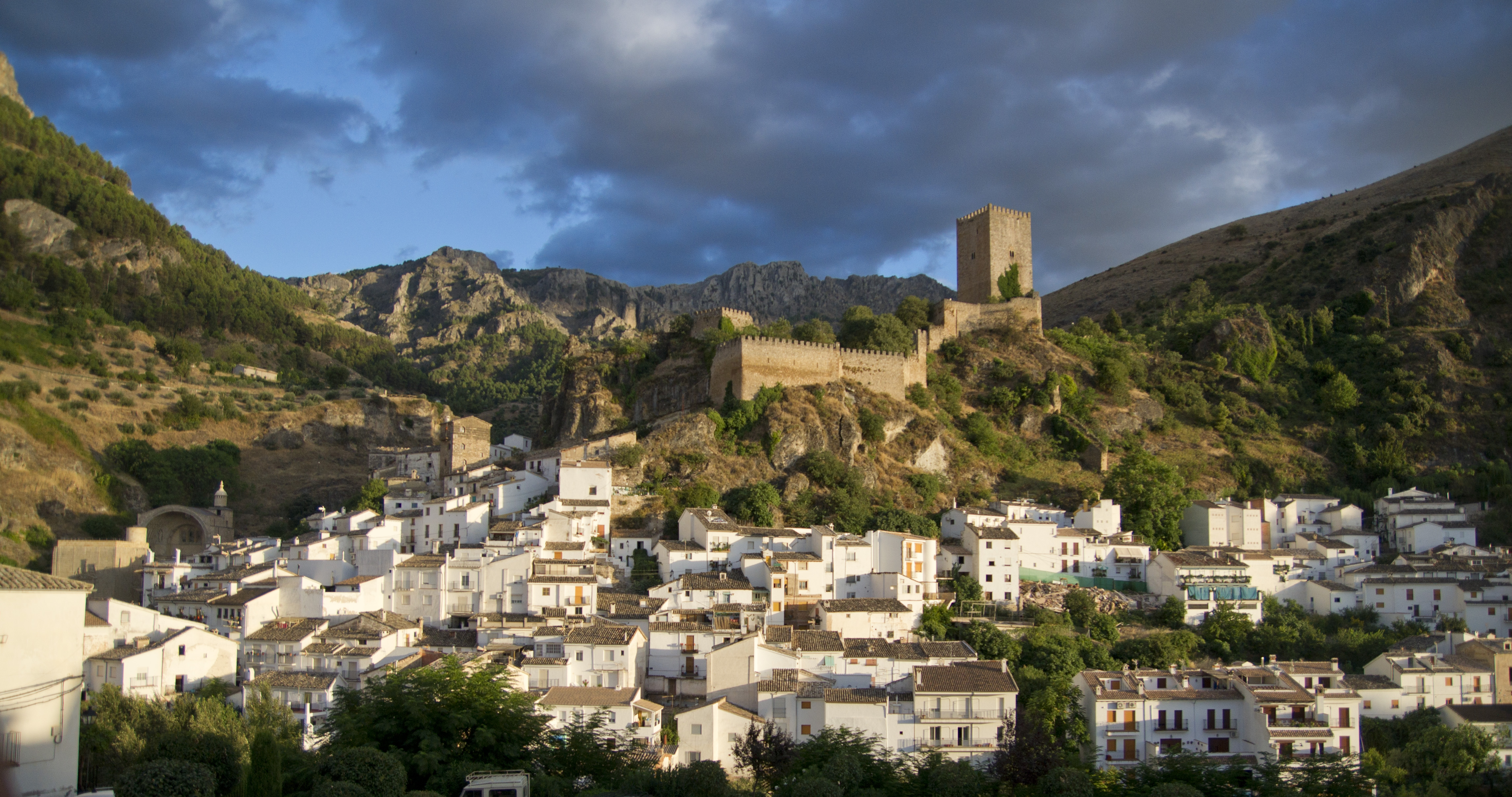
Castle of la Yedra

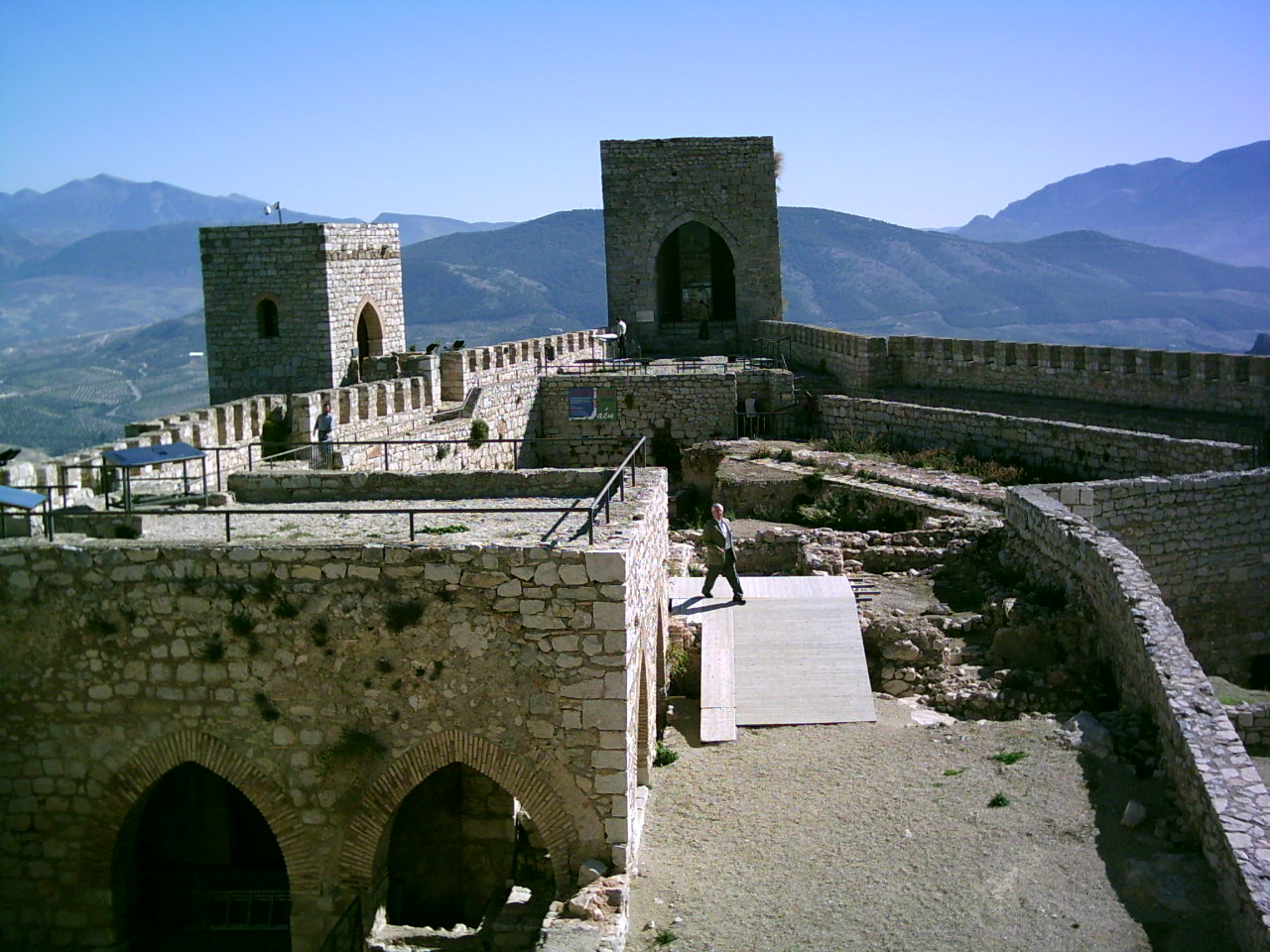
Castle of Santa Catalina

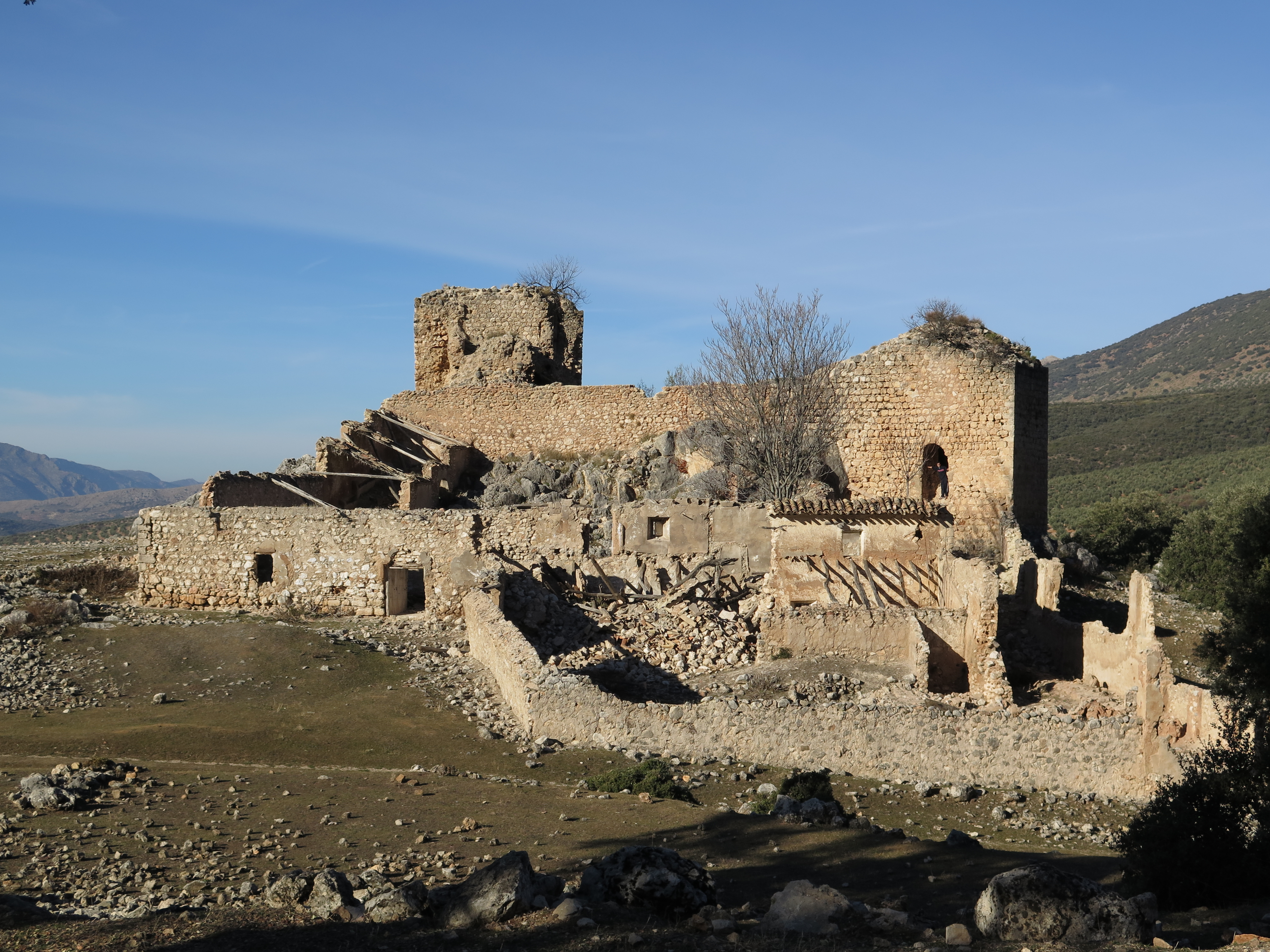
Castle of Mata Bejid

- Castle of Abrehuí
- Castle of Albanchez de Mágina
- Castle of Alcaudete
- Castle of Aldehuela
- Castle of Andújar
- Castle of Arjona
- Castle of Begíjar
- Castle of Boabdil (Porcuna)
- Castle of Bujaraiza
- Castle of Burgalimar (Baños de la Encina)
- Castle of Canena
- Castle of Cardete
- Castle of Castro Ferral (Santa Elena)
- Castle of Fuencubierta
- Castle of Giribaile (Vilches)
- Castle of Hornos
- Old Castle of Jaén
- Castle of Jamilena
- Castle of Jódar
- Castle of la Aragonesa (Marmolejo)
- Castle of la Encomienda de Víboras
- Castle of La Guardia de Jaén
- Castle of la Iruela
- Castle of la Muña
- Castle of la Peña de Martos
- Castle of la Tobaruela (Linares)
- Castle of la Villa de Martos
- Castle of la Yedra
- Castle del Berrueco (Torredelcampo)
- Castle of Linares
- Castle of Lopera
- Castle of Mata Bejid (Cambil)
- Castle of Sabiote
- Castle del Trovador Macías (Arjonilla)
- Castle of las Navas de Tolosa
- Castle of Otíñar
- Castle of Peñaflor (Jaén)
- Castle of Peñolite
- Castle of the Peñón
- Castle of Tíscar
- Castle of Torredonjimeno
- Castle of Torre Alcázar
- Castle of Torre Venzala
- Castle of Torres de Albanchez
- Castle of Toya
- Castle of Santa Catalina (Jaén)
- Castle of Santa Eufemia (Cástulo)
- Castle of Segura de la Sierra
- Castillejo de Zumel
- Castle of la Torre de Martos
- Castle of Vilches
- Fortress of la Mota (Alcalá la Real)
- Towers of Santa Catalina
- Tower Olvidada
- Tower of Santa Ana (Alcalá la Real)
- Peñas de Castro
- Walls of Jaén
- Walls of Úbeda

=== Málaga ===
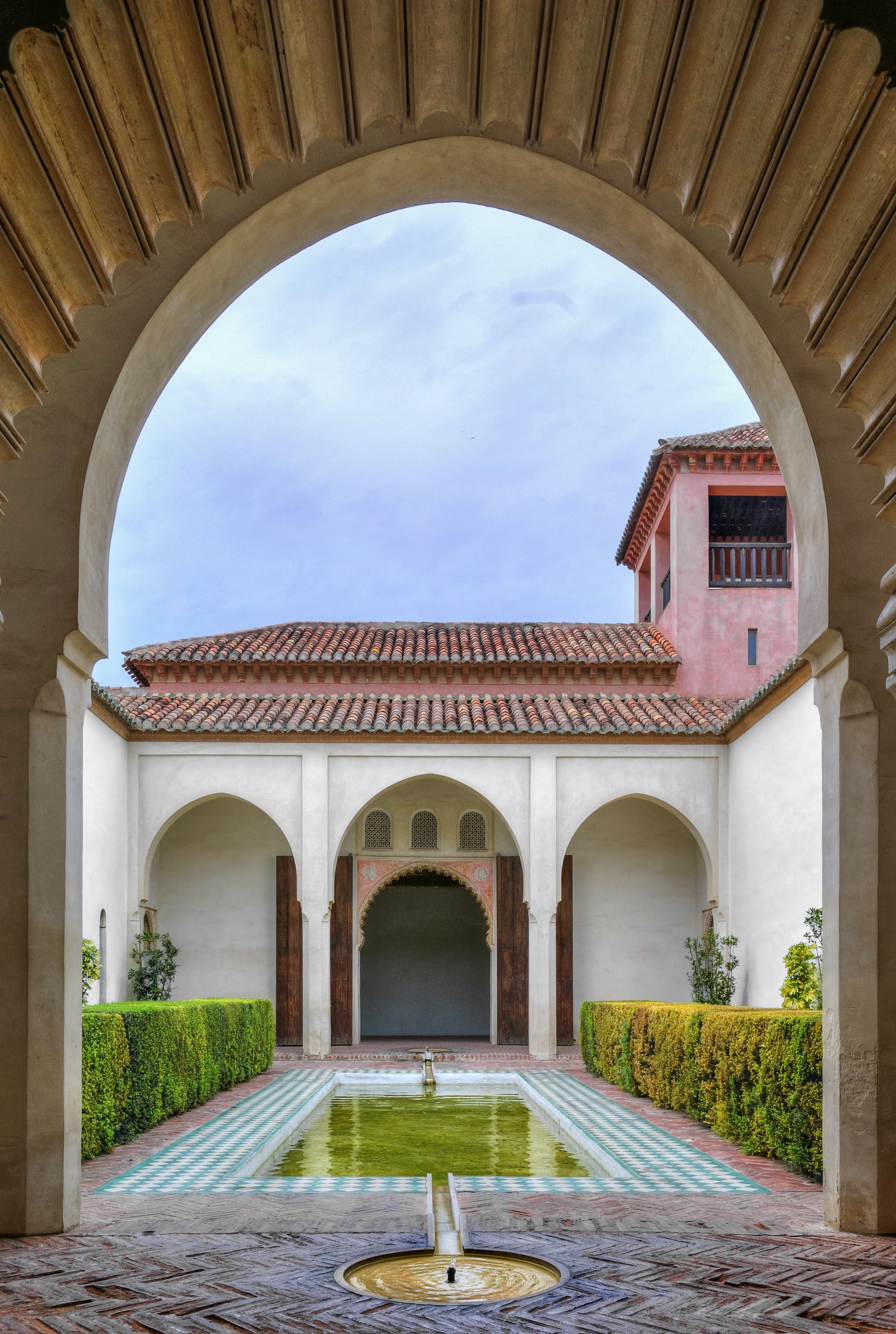
Alcazaba of Málaga.

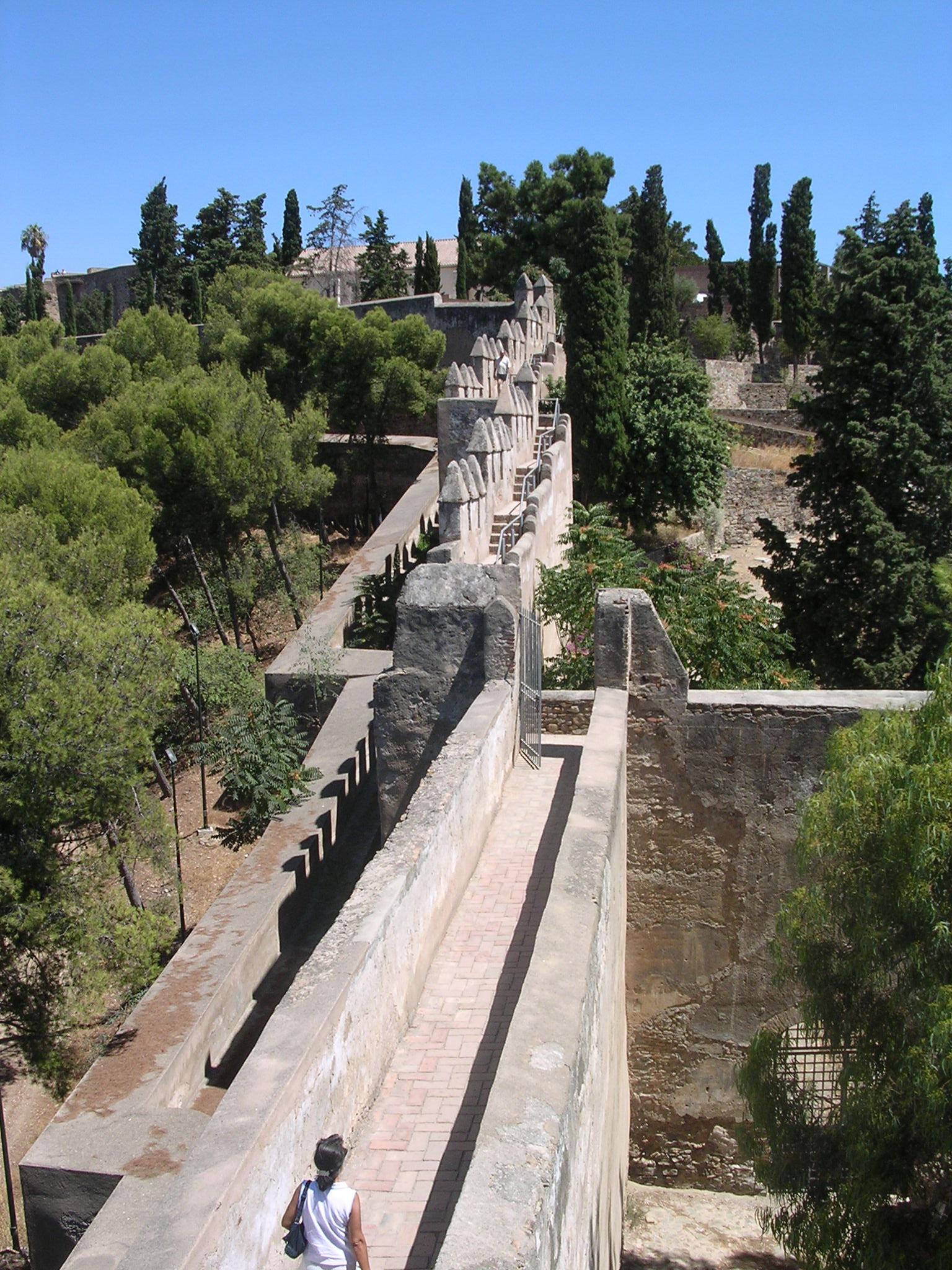
Gibralfaro Castle, Málaga.

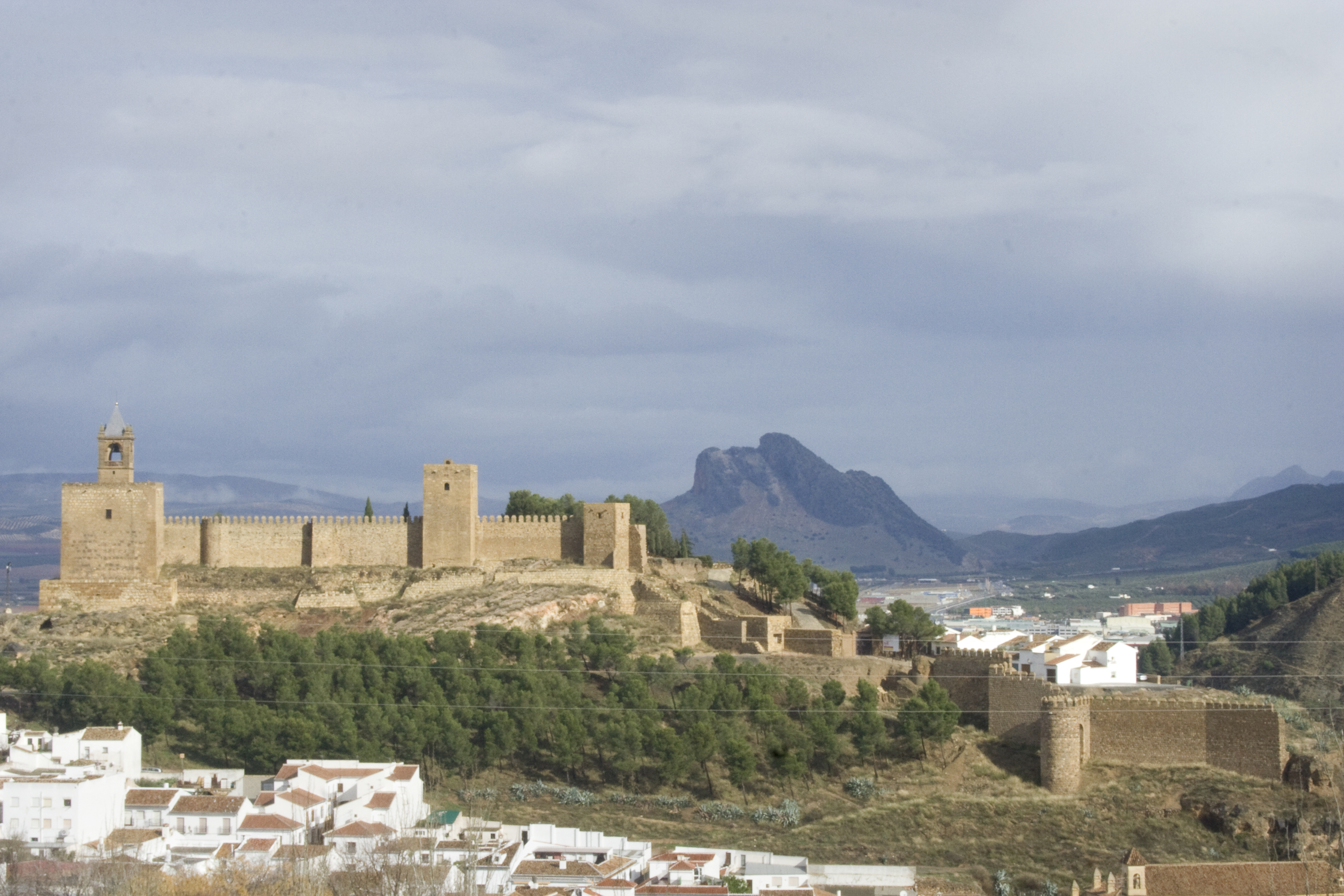
Alcazaba of Antequera

- Alcazaba of Málaga
- Castle of Gibralfaro (Málaga)
- Sohail Castle
- Alcazaba of Antequera
- Alcazaba of Vélez-Málaga
- Castle del Águila
- Castle of Álora
- Castle of Archidona
- Castle of Bentomiz
- Castle of Bezmiliana
- Castle of Cártama
- Castle of Hins-Canit
- Castle of Jévar
- Castle of Lizar
- Castle of Santa Catalina (Málaga)
- Castle of Zalia
- Tower Battery of La Cala del Moral
- Tower Bermeja (Benalmádena)
- Tower of Calaburras
- Torre Ladrones
- Torre Río Real
- Tower of Calaburras
- Tower Molinos
- Tower del Muelle
- Tower Quebrada
- Nasrid Walls and Port Walls (Málaga)
- Phoenician Walls of Málaga
- Urban Walls of Marbella

=== Sevilla ===
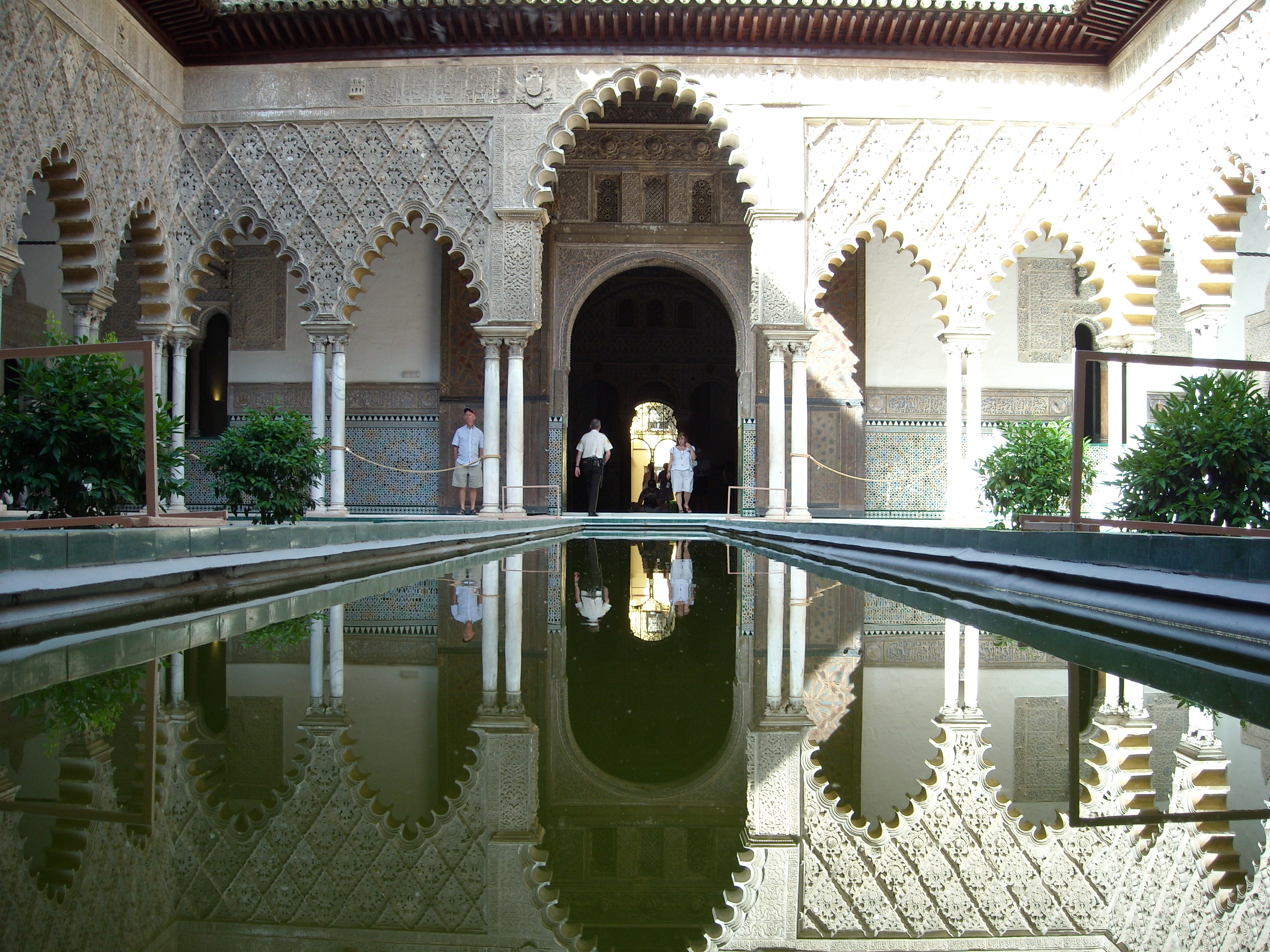
Alcázar of Seville

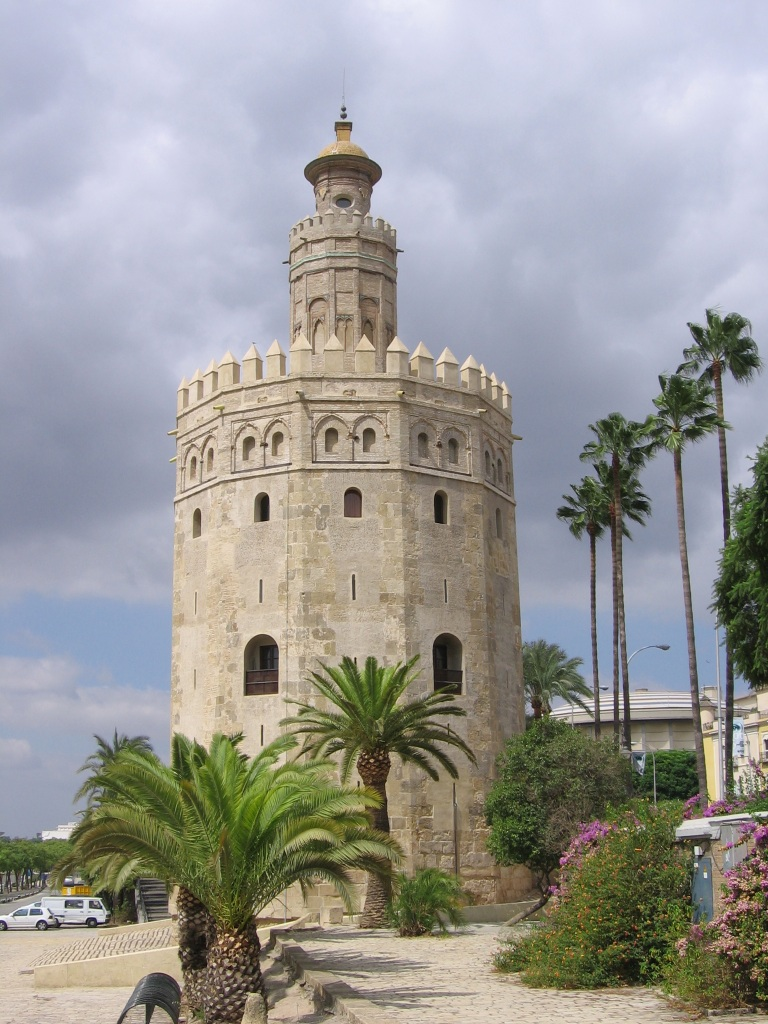
Torre del Oro

- Alcázar of the King Don Pedro
- Alcázar Puerta de Sevilla, Carmona
- Alcazar of Alcalá de Guadaíra
- Alcázar of Seville
- Castle of Cote (Montellano)
- Castle of El Coronil
- Castle of El Real de la Jara
- Castle of Estepa
- Castle of las Aguzaderas (El Coronil)
- Castle of Lebrija
- Castle of Los Molares
- Castle of Luna (Mairena del Alcor)
- Castle of Marchenilla (Alcalá de Guadaíra)
- Castle of Morón de la Frontera
- Castle of Setefilla
- Castle of Utrera
- Tower Abd el Aziz
- Torre del Oro
- Torre de la Plata
- Tower of la Rijana
- Tower of los Herberos

== Aragón ==
=== Huesca ===
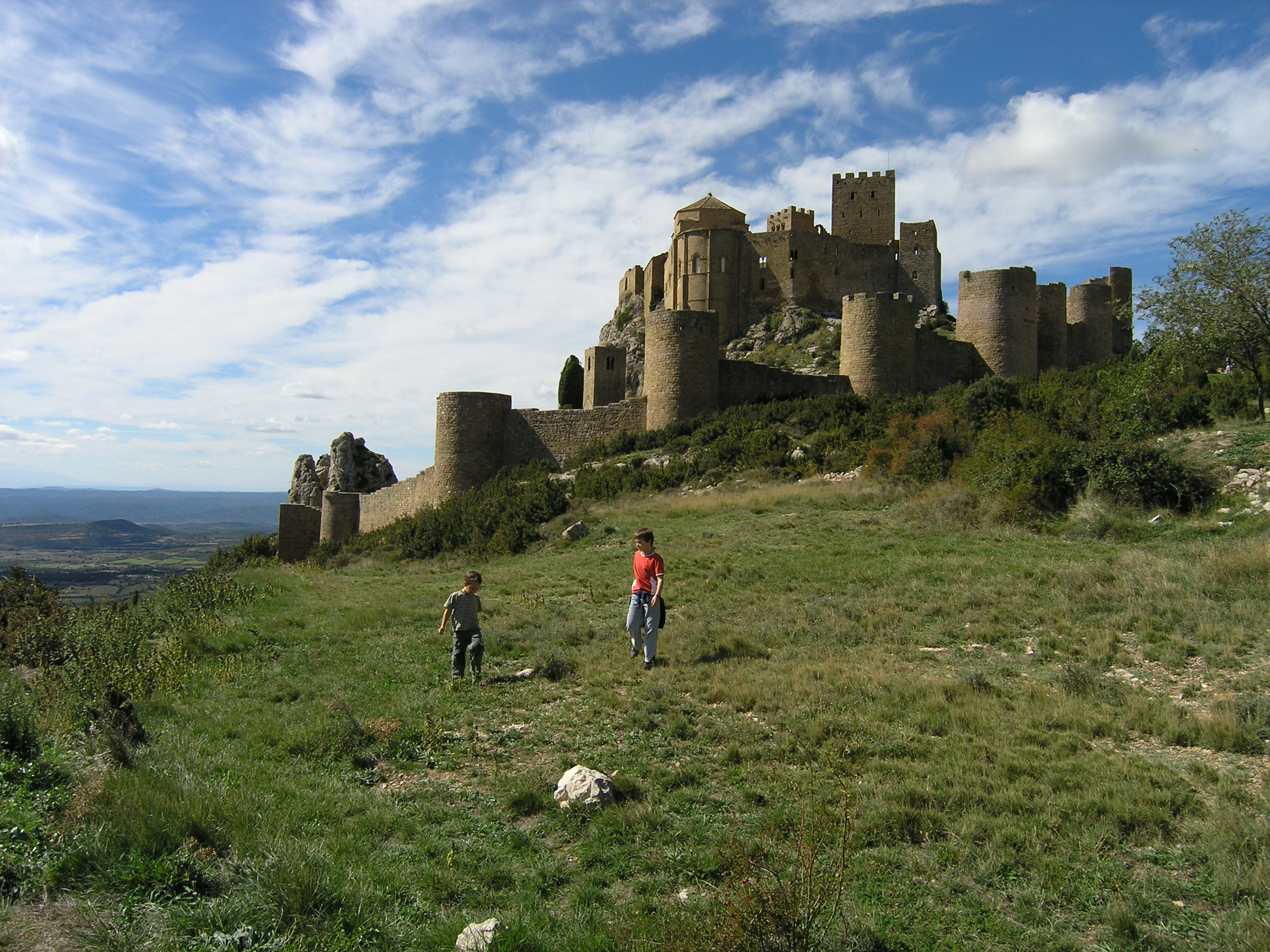
Castle of Loarre

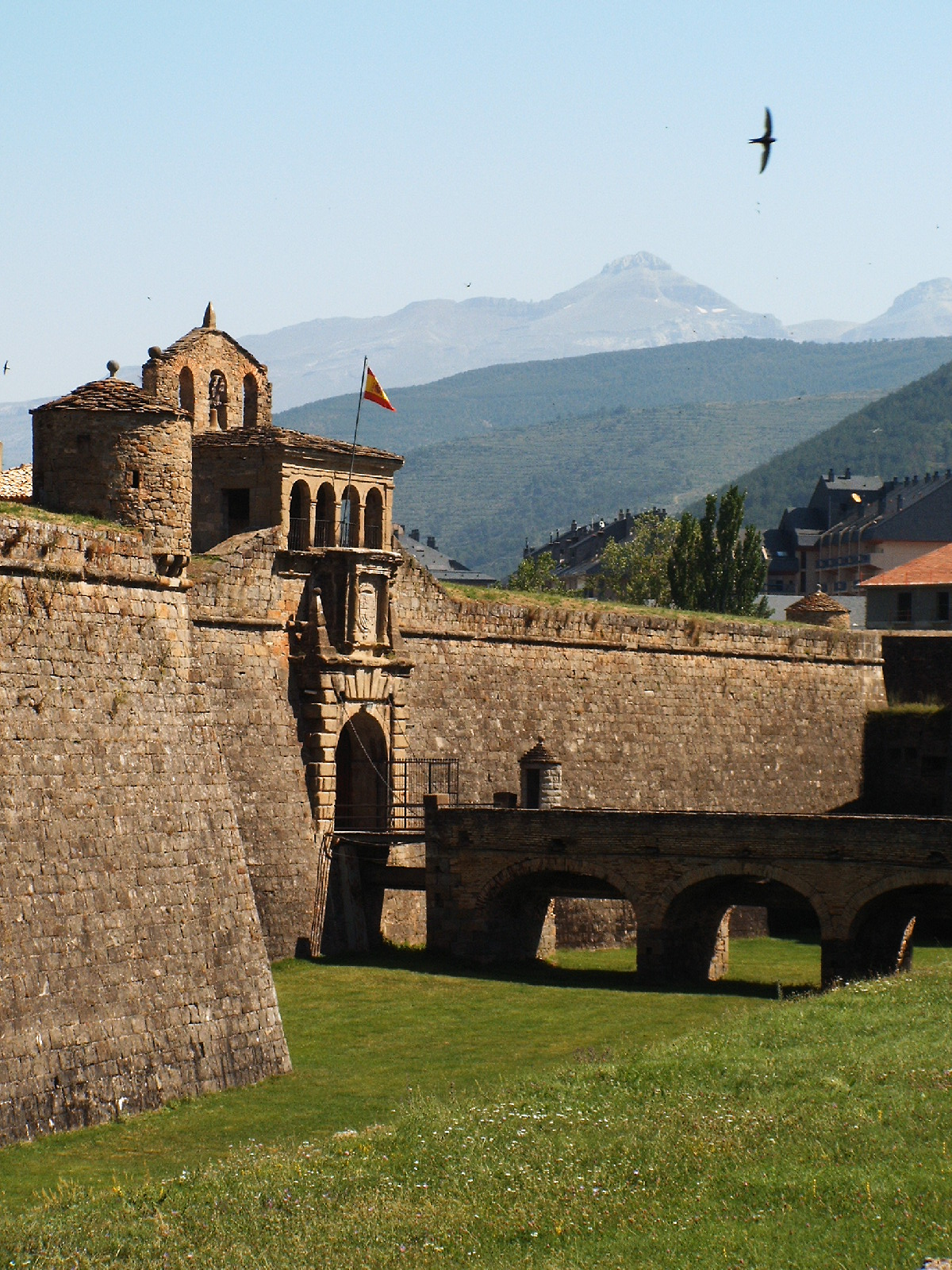
Citadel of Jaca

- Castle of Arrés
- Castle of Alquezar
- Castle Palace of Argabieso
- Castle of Benabarre
- Castle of Boltaña
- Castle of Fantova
- Castle of Loarre
- Castle of Marcuello
- Castle of Monzón
- Castle of Montearagón
- Castle of Samitier
- Castle of Torres-Secas
- Citadel of Jaca
- Tower of Fiscal
- Walls of Antillón

=== Teruel ===
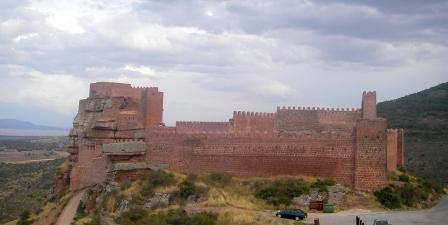
Castle of Peracense

- Castle of Albarracín
- Castle of Alcalá de la Selva
- Castle of Calanda
- Castle of Alcañiz
- Castle of Mora de Rubielos
- Castle of Ojos Negros
- Castle of Peracense
- Castle of Puertomingalvo
- Castle of Tornos
- Castle of Valderrobres
- Castle of Villel

=== Zaragoza ===
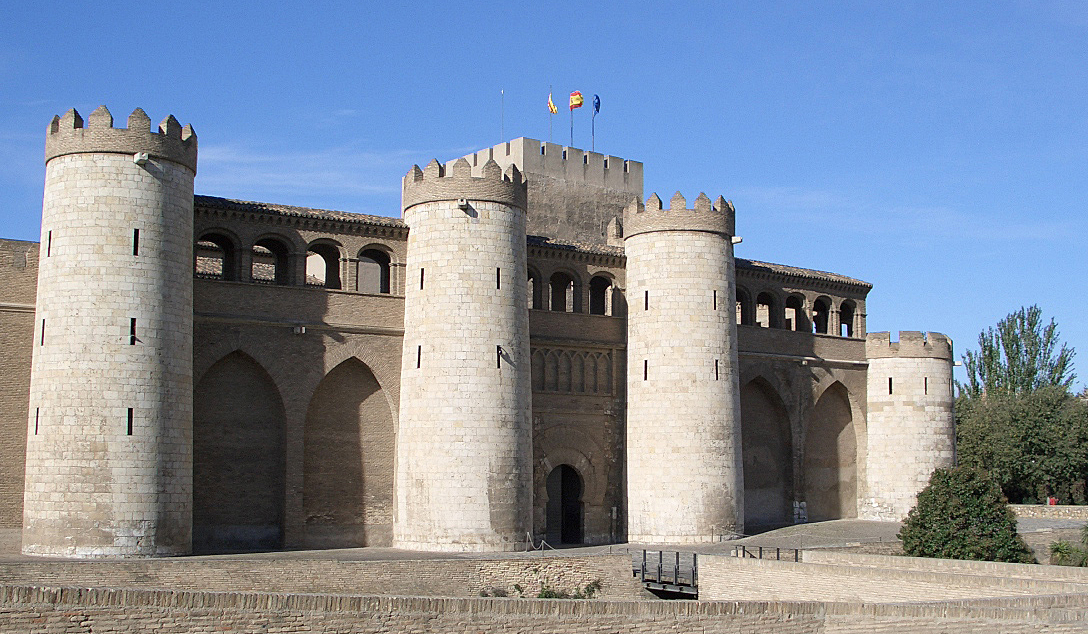
Castle of Aljafería

- Castle of Aljafería
- Castle of Aranda de Moncayo
- Castle of Bichuesca
- Castle of Arandiga
- Castle of Grisel
- Castle of Biel
- Castle of Daroca
- Castle of Exarc de Moncayo
- Castle of Luesia
- Castle of Mesones de Isuela
- Castle of Sadaba
- Castle of Sibirana
- Castle of Trasmoz
- Castle of Uncastillo
- Castle of la Zuda (Borja)
- Castle Mayor (Daroca)
- Torreón of La Zuda
- Walls of Zaragoza

== Principality of Asturias ==
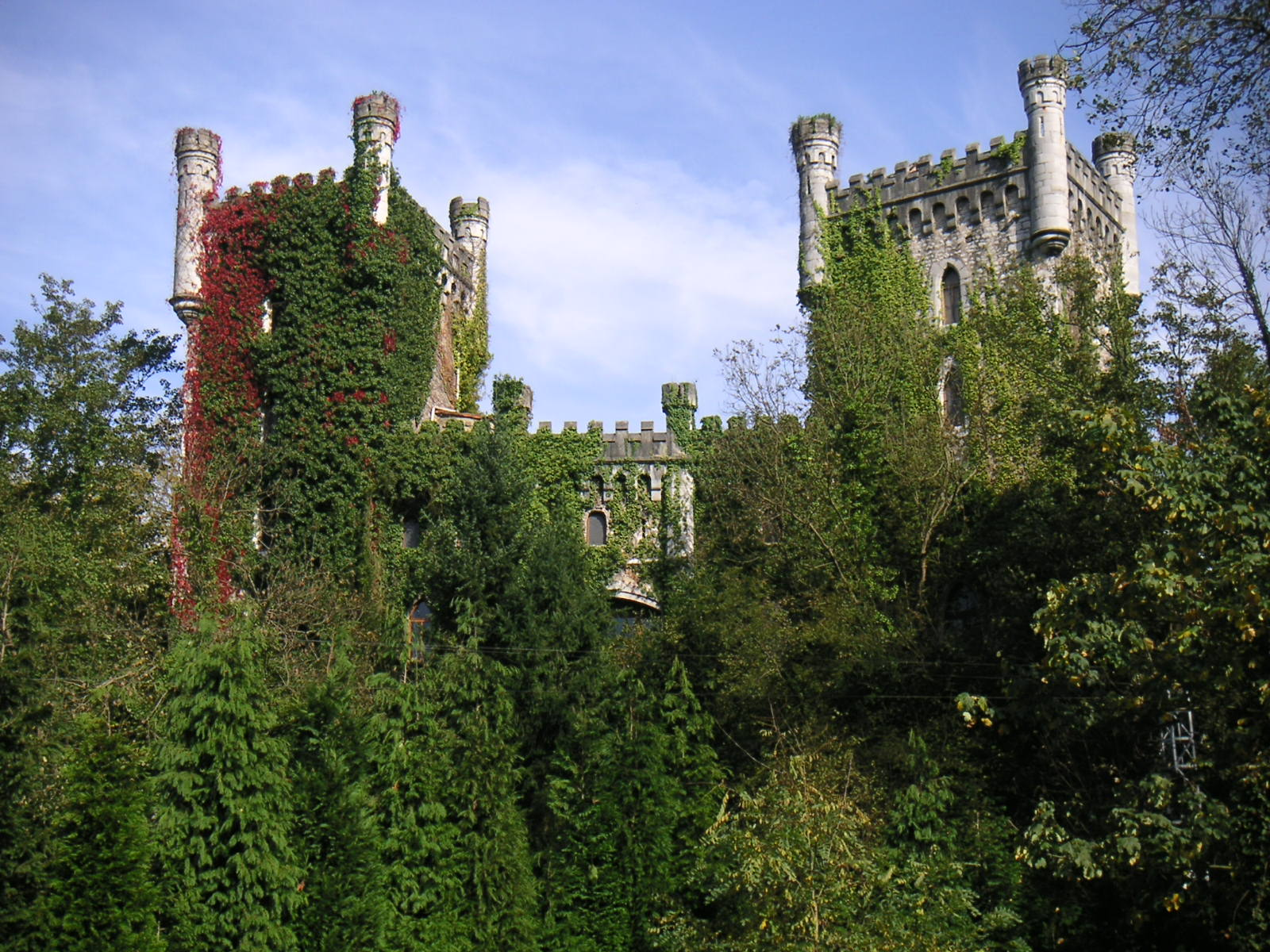
Castle of Las Caldas

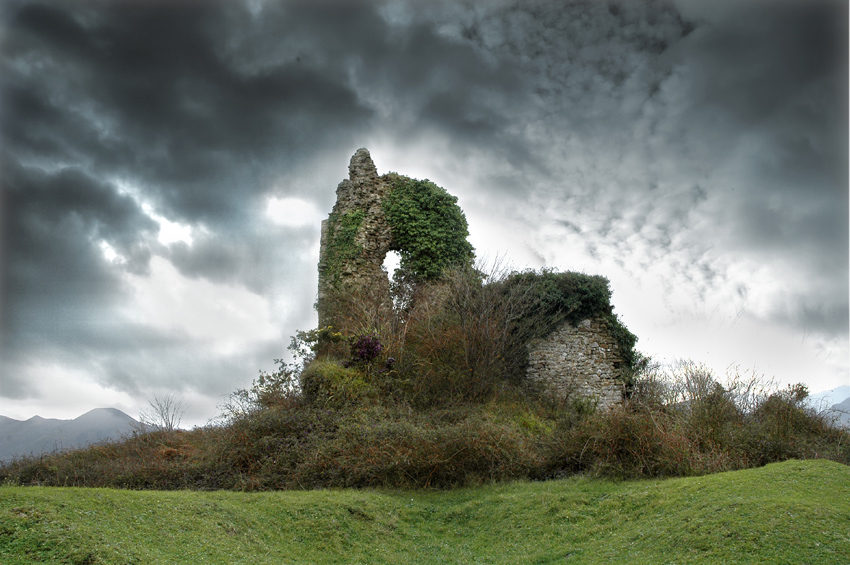
Castle of Tudela

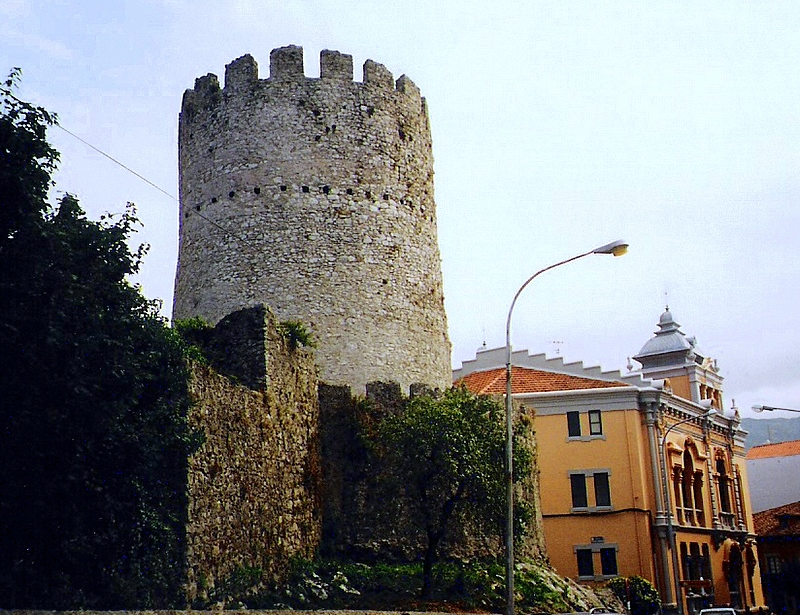
Torreón of Llanes

- Castle of Alba (Quirós)
- Castle of Alba (Somiedo)
- Castle of Alesga
- Castle of Campogrande
- Castle of Las Caldas
- Castle of la Cabezada
- Castle of Gauzón
- Castle of Peña Manil
- Castle of Salas
- Castle of San Martín
- Castle of Soto (Aller)
- Castle of Soto (Ribera de Arriba)
- Castle of Soto de los Infantes
- Castle of Tudela
- Castle of Villademoros
- Castle of Villamorey
- Palace Ferrera (Báscones)
- El Torreón
- Torreón of Llanes
- Torreón of Ludeña
- Torreón of Peñerudes
- Tower del Valledor
- Tower of the Castle of Yabio
- Tower of los Valdés
- Tower of Proaza
- Tower of la Quintana
- Tower of los Valdés
- Tower of San Julián
- Tower of Tronquedo
- Walls of Oviedo

== Basque Country ==
=== Araba ===
- Castle of Zabala
- Castle of Gebara
- Castle of Eskibel
- Castle of Ocio
- Roman oppidum of Iruña-Veleia
- Tower of Mendoza
- Tower of los Varona
- Tower of Barrón
- Tower of Doña Otxanda in Vitoria-Gasteiz
- Tower of Orgaz and Tower of Kondestable
- Tower Negorta
- Tower-House of Calderondar eta Salazatar
- Tower-House of Galartza
- Walls of Vitoria-Gasteiz
- Old town of Vitoria-Gasteiz
- Walled town of Labraza
- Walled town of Antoñana
- Walled town of Laguardia
- Walled town of Gatzaga Buradon
- Walled town of Urizaharra

=== Gipuzkoa ===
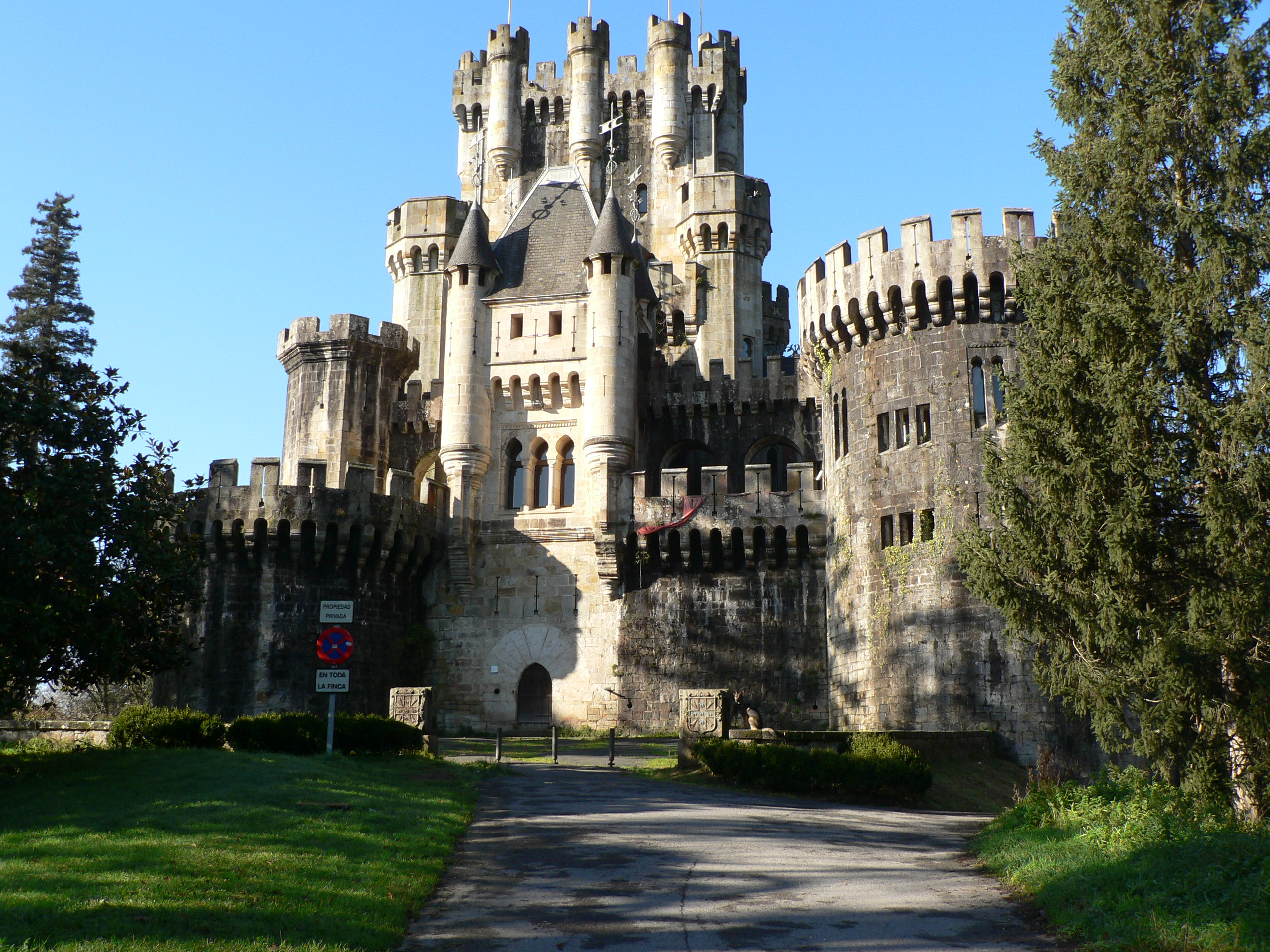
Castle of Butrón

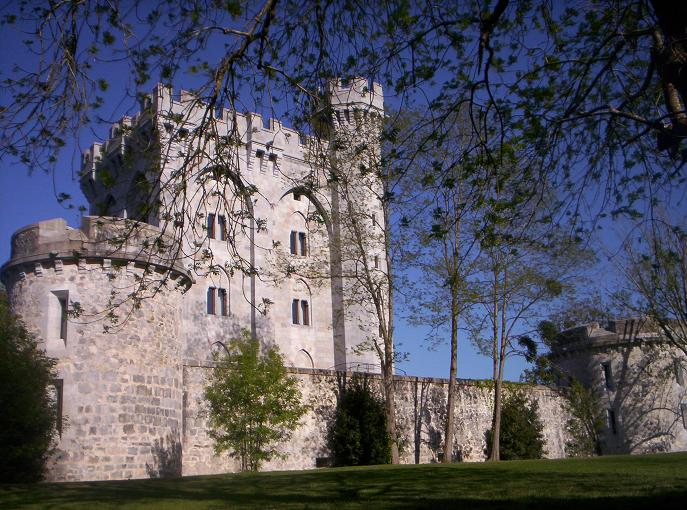
Castle of Empress Eugénie de Montijo

- Castle of Gaztelu Zahar
- Castle of Charles V
- Castle of la Mota in the Mount Urgull in San Sebastián
- Castle of Atxorrotx
- Fort of San Marcos
- Tower Idiakez
- Tower of Sasiola
- Tower Zumeltzegi
- Tower-House Enparan
- Walled town of Hondarribia
- Walled town of Leintz-Gatzaga

=== Biscay ===
- Castle of Butrón
- Castle of Empress Eugénie de Montijo
- Castle of Muñatoizko San Martin
- Castle of Malmasin
- Complex of coastal fortresses of the Mount Serantes
- Fort of la Galea
- Torre Loizaga
- Tower of Lezama
- Tower Malpika
- Tower of Salazar
- Tower of Zamudio
- Tower Martiartu
- Tower of Muntsaratz
- Tower-House Likona
- Tower-House of Urrutia
- Walled town of Bermeo

== Balearic Islands ==
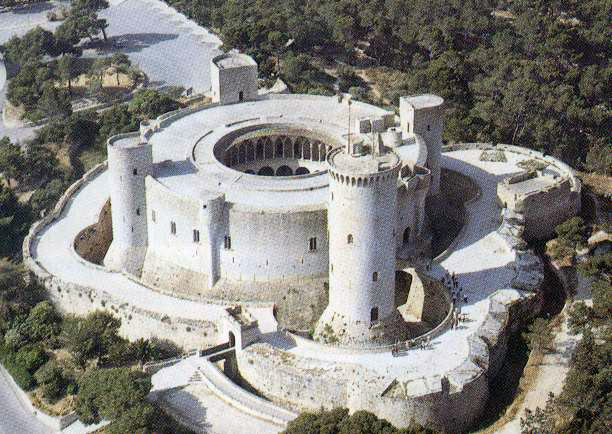
Castle of Bellver

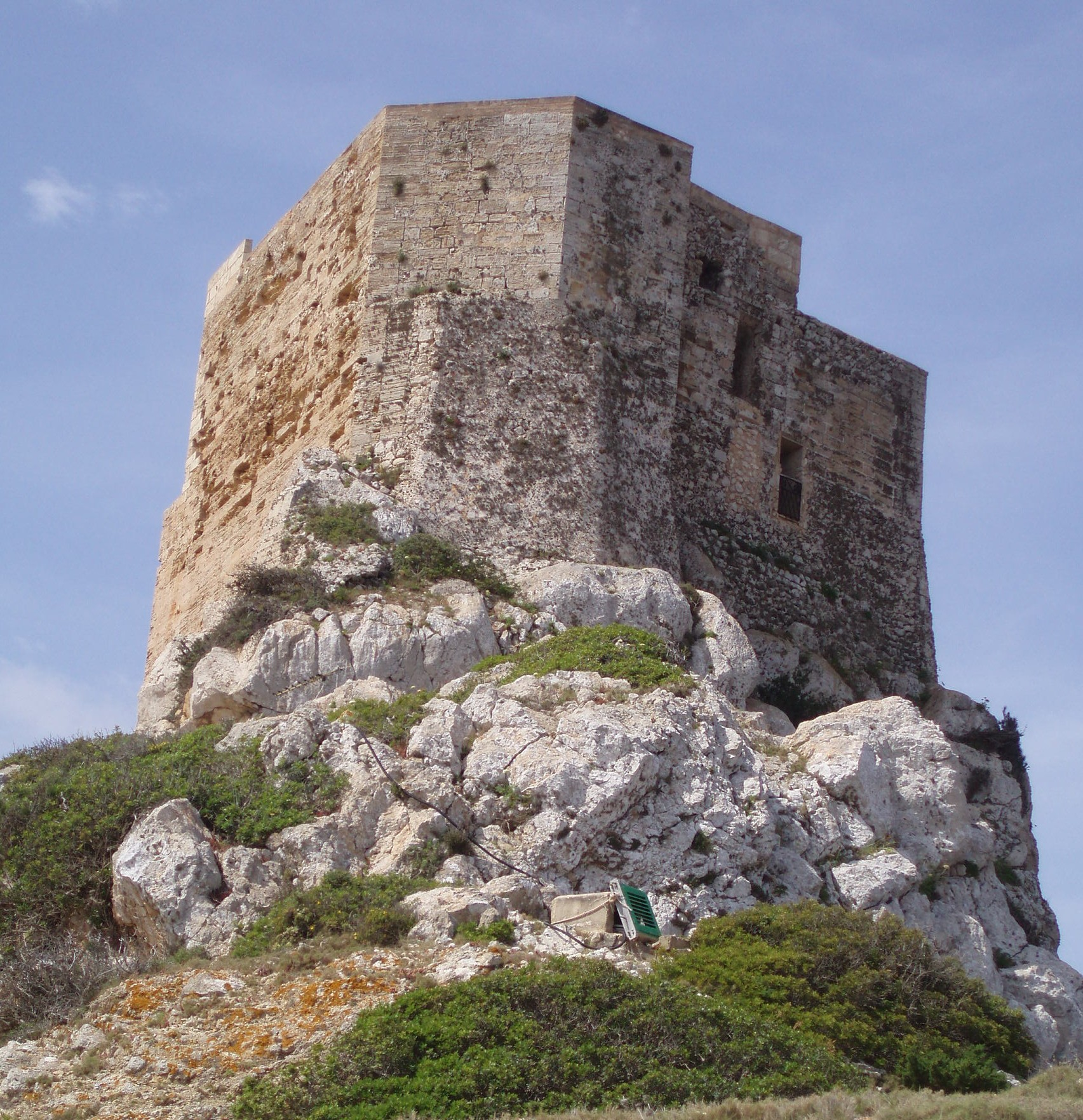
Castle of Cabrera

- Castle of Alaró
- Castle of Amer
- Bellver Castle
- St. Philip's Castle, Mahón
- Castle of Bendinat
- Castle of Cabrera (Cabrera island)^{es}
- Castle of Capdepera
- Castle of Pollensa^{es}
- Castle of Santa Àgueda
- Castle of Santueri
- Fortress of Sant Carles
- Fortress of Isabella II

== Canary Islands ==
- Castle of la Luz
- Castle of Mata
- Castle of San Felipe (Puerto de la Cruz)
- Castle of San Francisco (Las Palmas de Gran Canaria)
- Castle of San Miguel (Garachico)
- Castle of Guanapay
- Castle of Paso Alto (Santa Cruz de Tenerife)
- Castle of San Joaquín
- Castle of San Cristóbal (Santa Cruz de Tenerife)
- Castle of San Cristóbal (Las palmas de Gran Canaria)
- Castle of St John the Baptist
- Castle of San Andrés
- Fortress of Santa Catalina (Las Palmas de Gran Canaria)
- Fort of Almeyda

== Cantabria ==
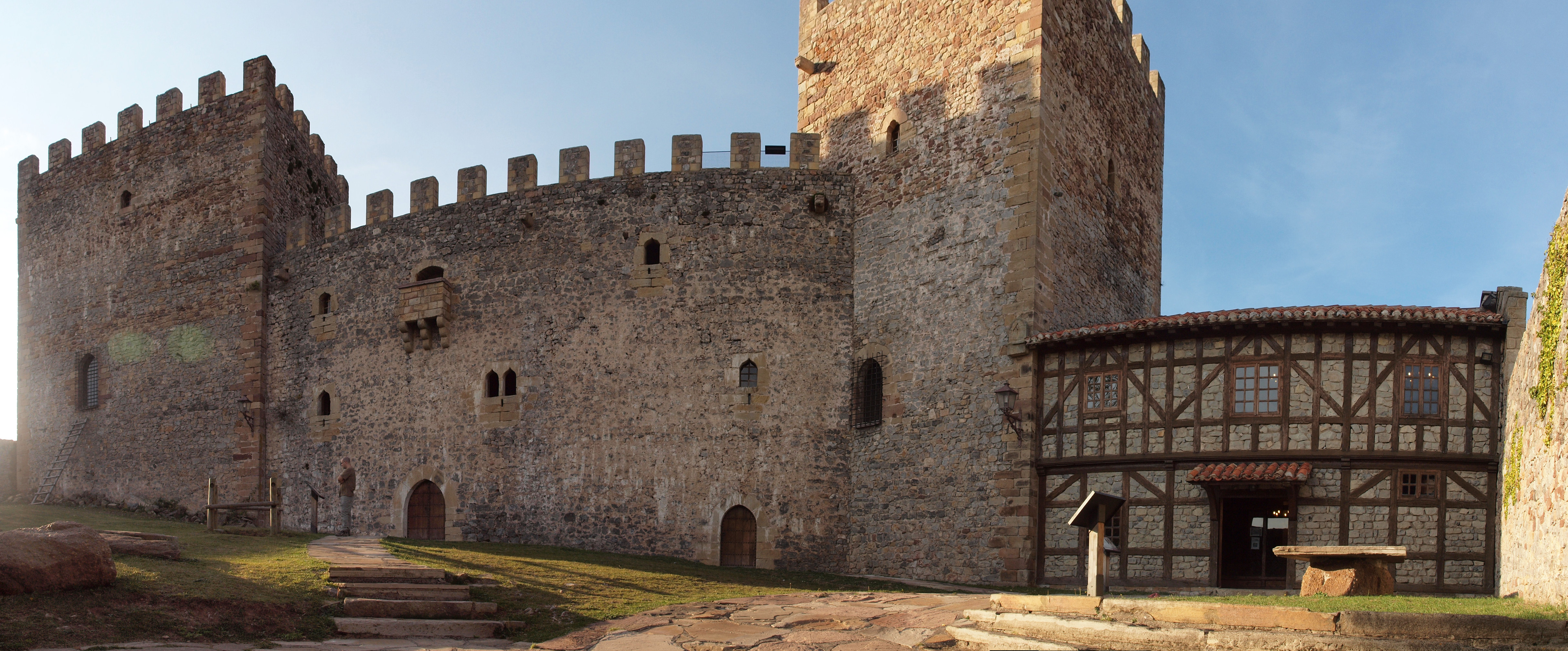
Castle of Argüeso

- Castle of Aldueso
- Castle of Allendelagua
- Castle of Agüero
- Castle of Argüeso
- Castle of Castro Urdiales
- Castle of Cobejo
- Castle of El Collado
- Castle of El Haya
- Castle of Montehano
- Castle of Piñeres
- Castle of Pedraja
- Castle of San Felices de Buelna
- Castle of San Vicente de la Barquera
- Castle of Suances
- Castle of Treceño
- Castillo de Villamoñico
- Castle of Villegas
- Castle of Vispieres
- Palace of Riva-Herrera
- Fort del Mazo
- Battery of San Martín
- Battery of San Martín Alto
- Battery of San Pedro del Mar
- Low Battery of Galvanes

== Castile and León ==
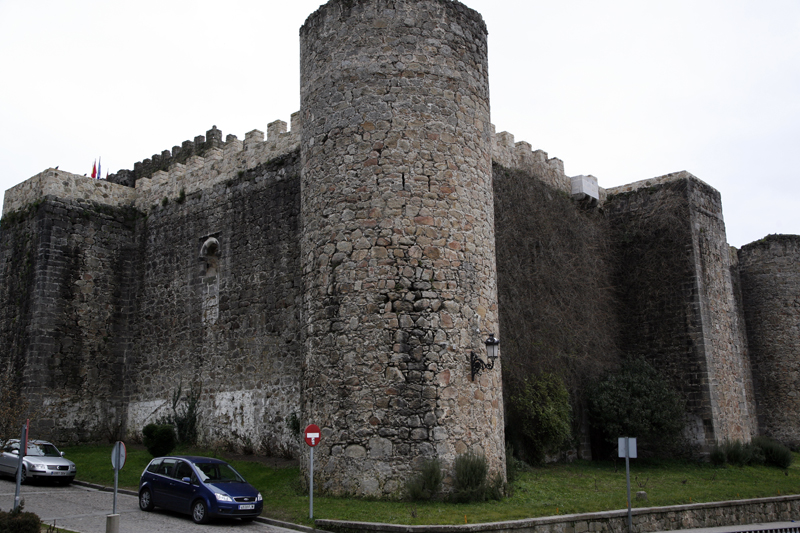
Castle of Don Álvaro de Luna

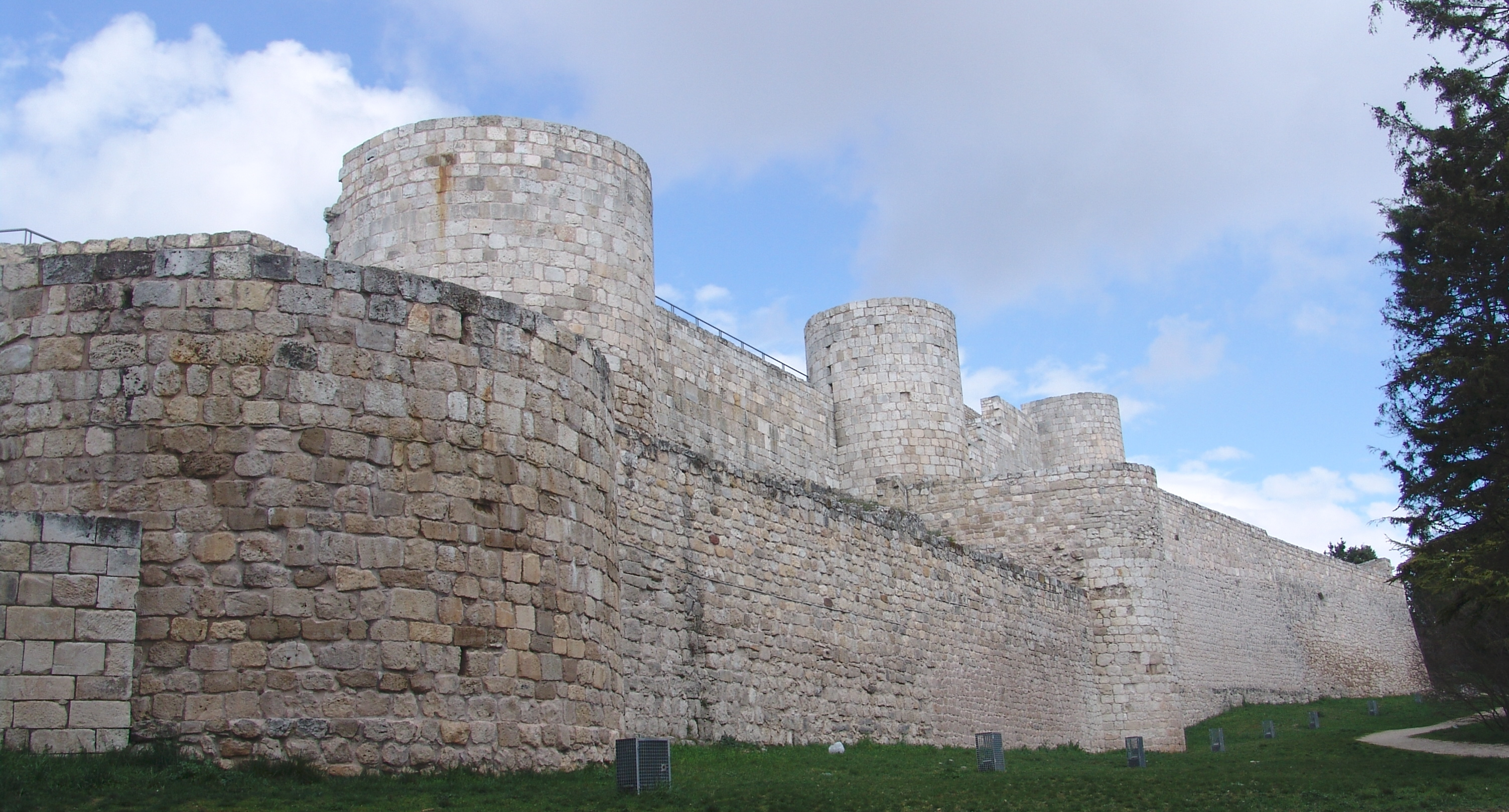
Castle of Burgos

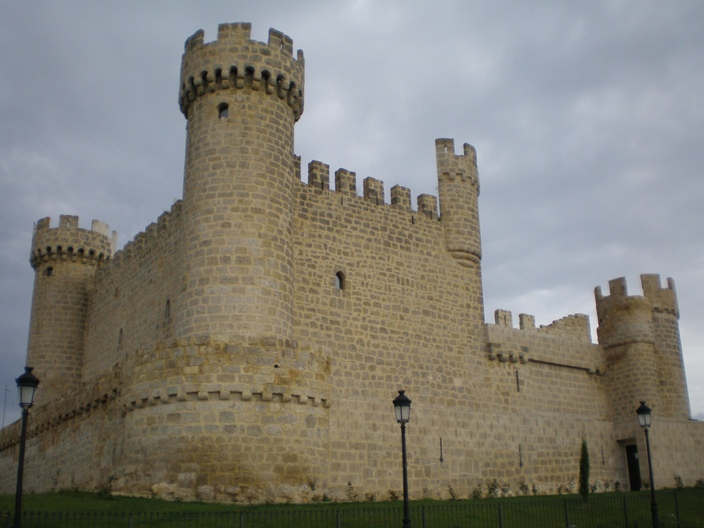
Castle of Olmillos de Sasamón

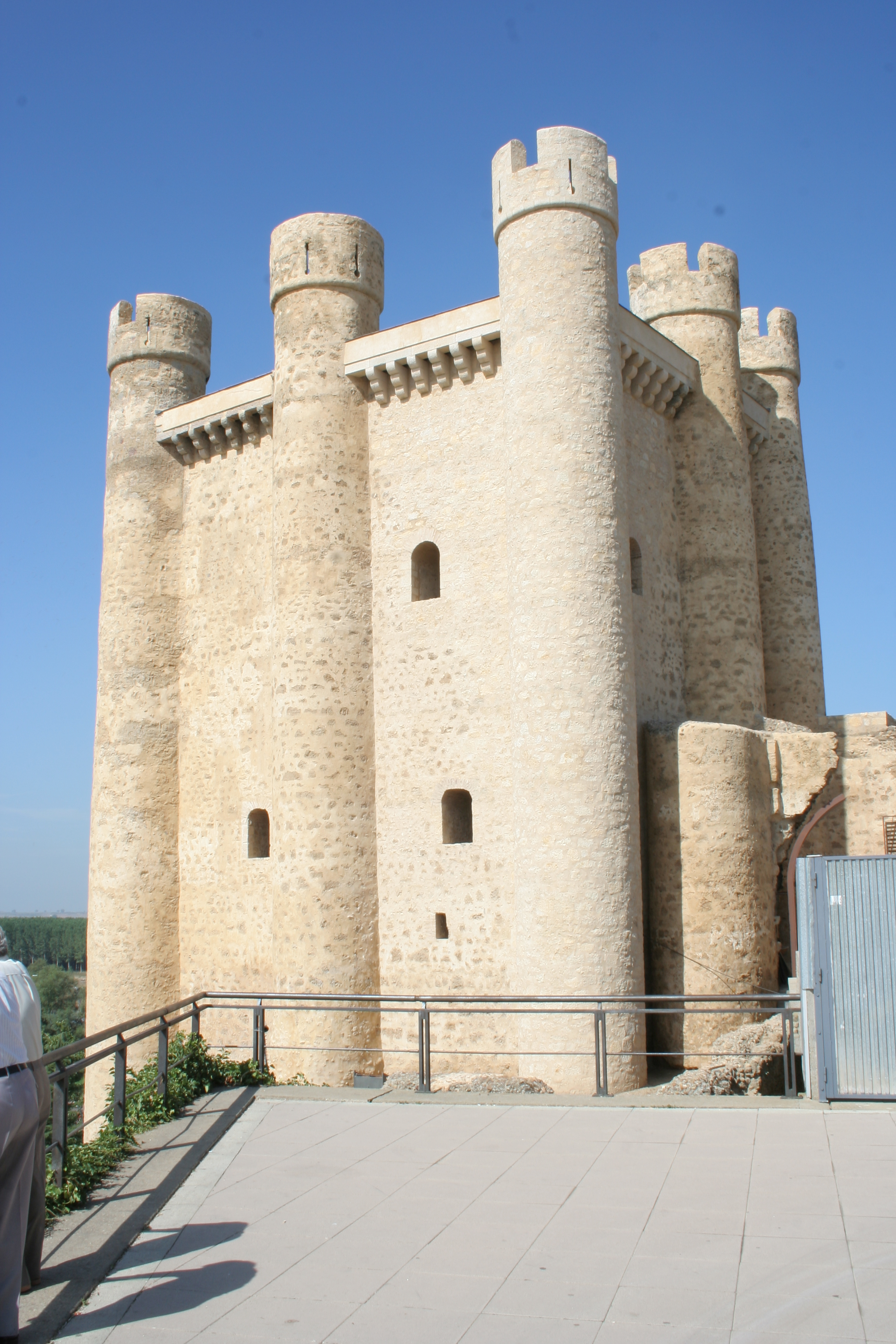
Castle of Valencia de Don Juan

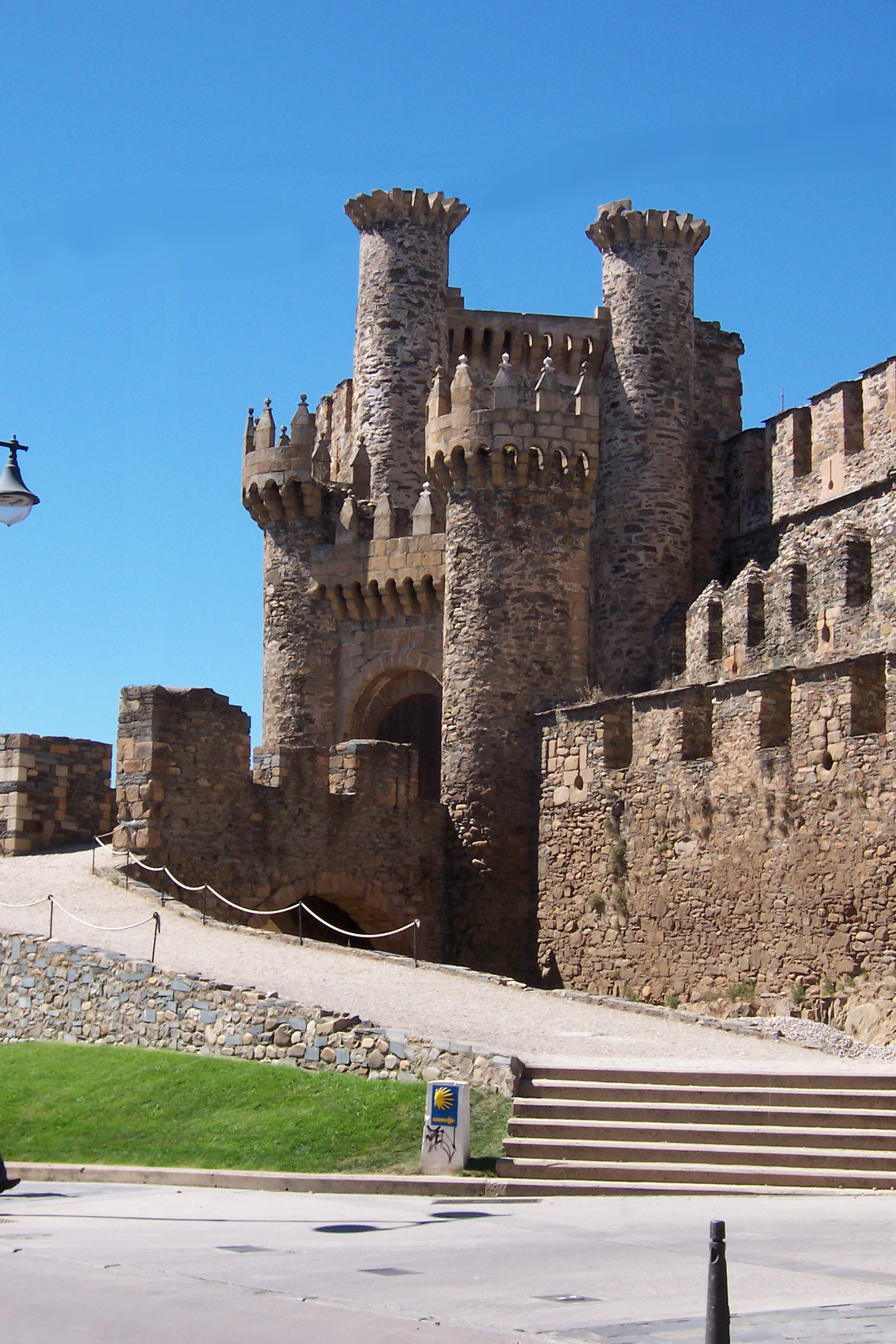
Templar Castle of Ponferrada

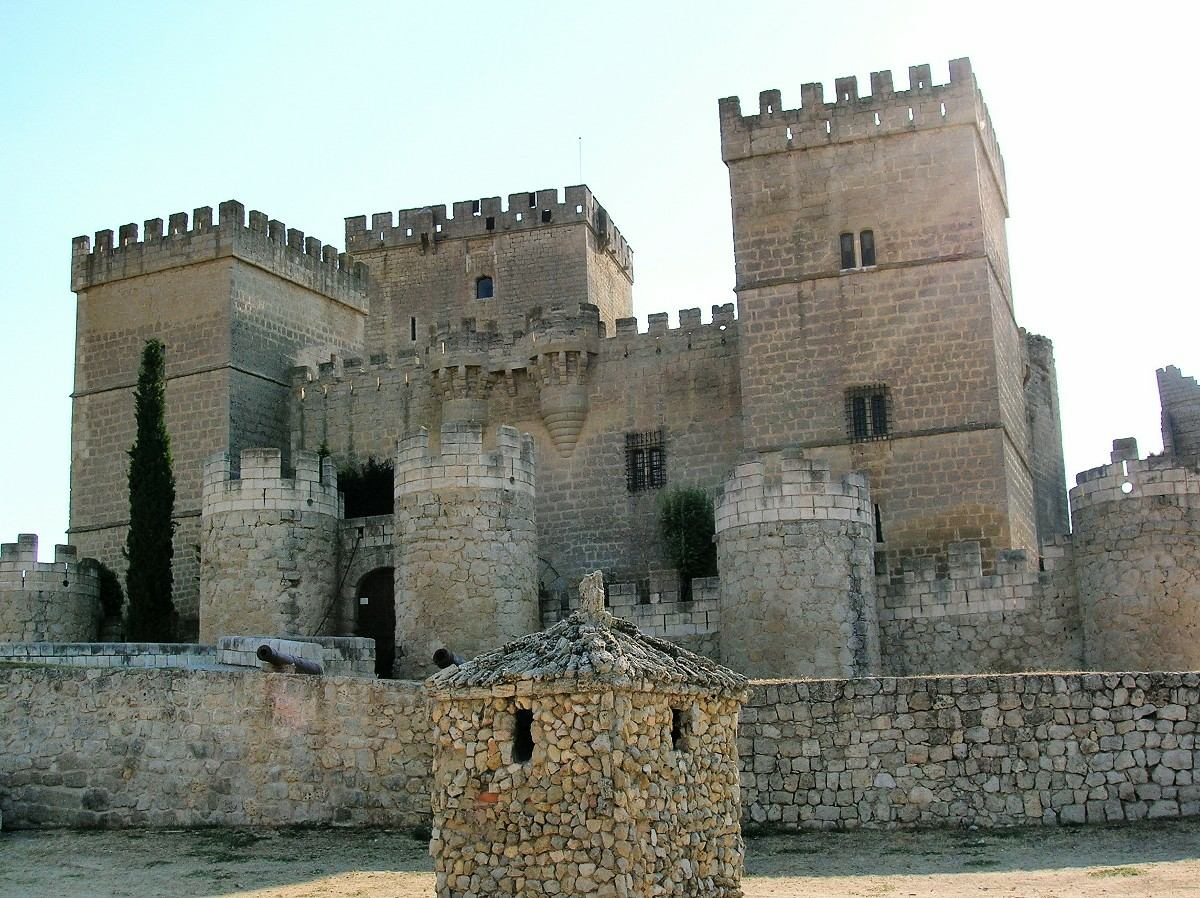
Castle of Ampudia

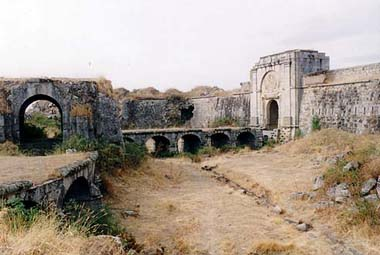
Real Fuerte de la Concepción

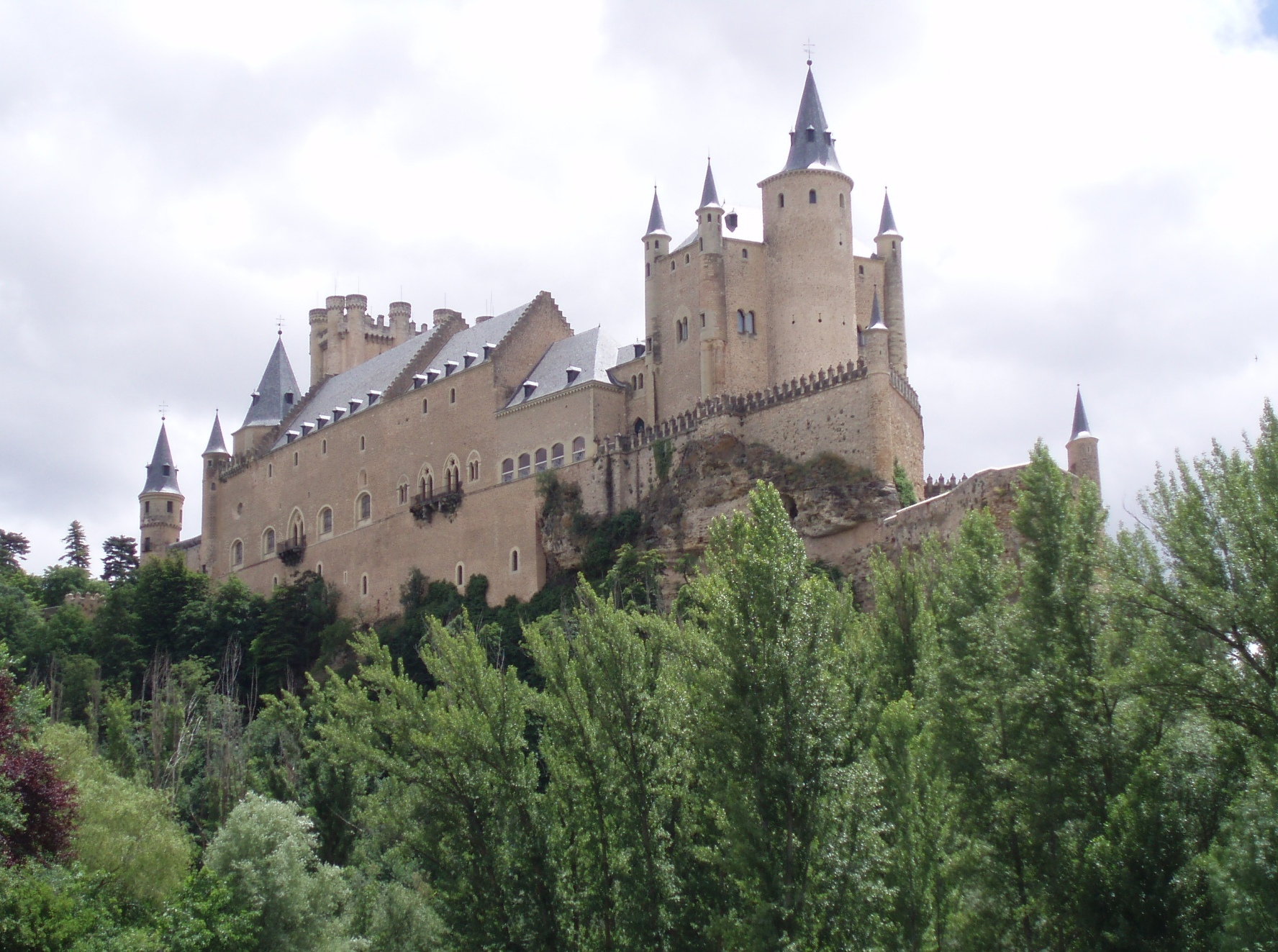
Alcázar of Segovia

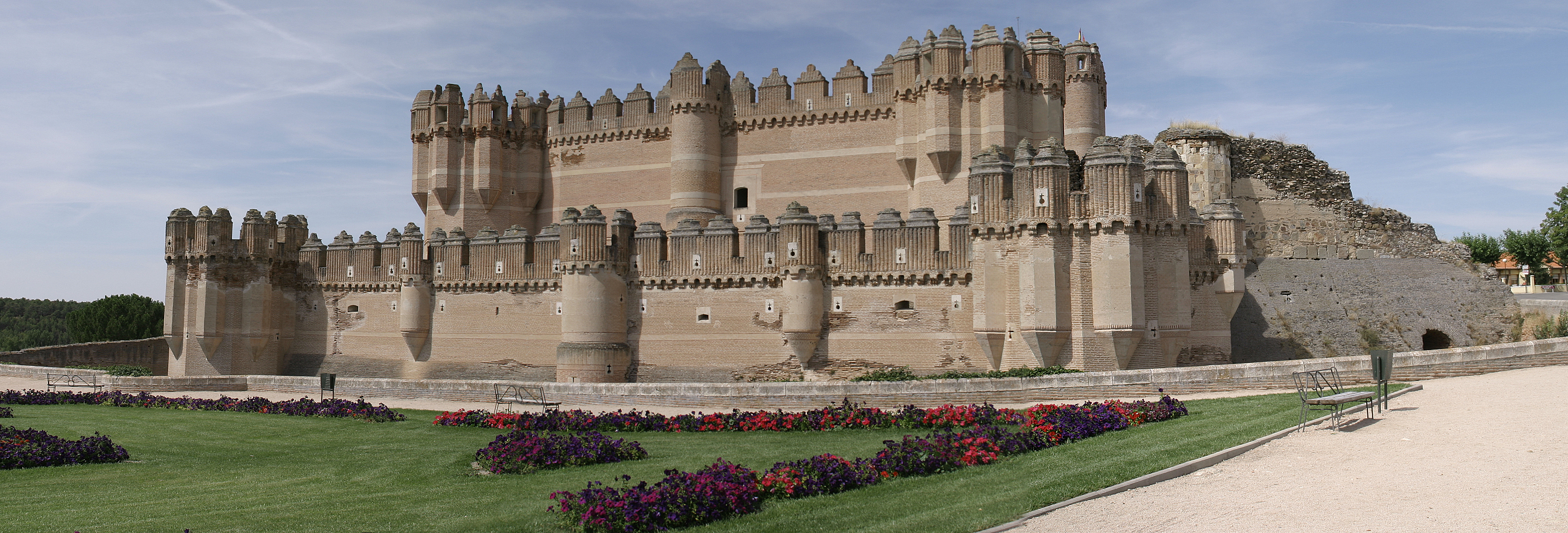
Castle of Coca

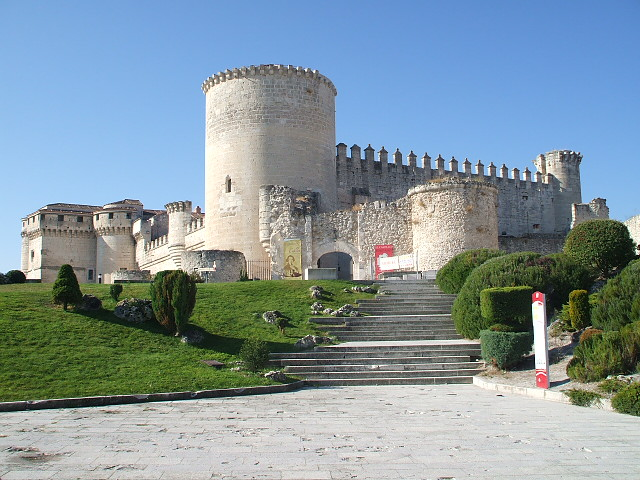
Castle of Cuéllar

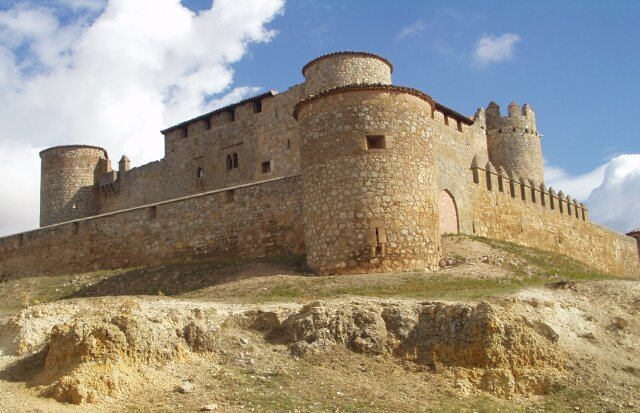
Castle of Almenar

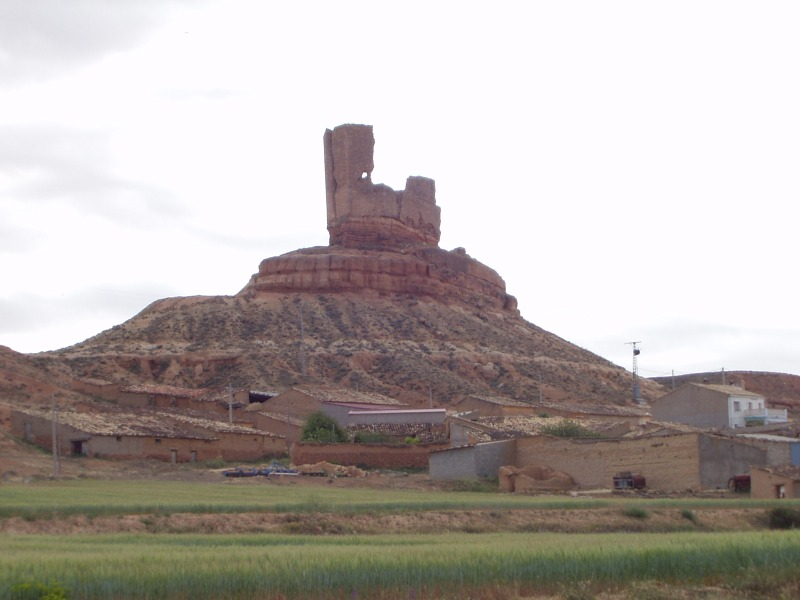
Castle of Montuenga

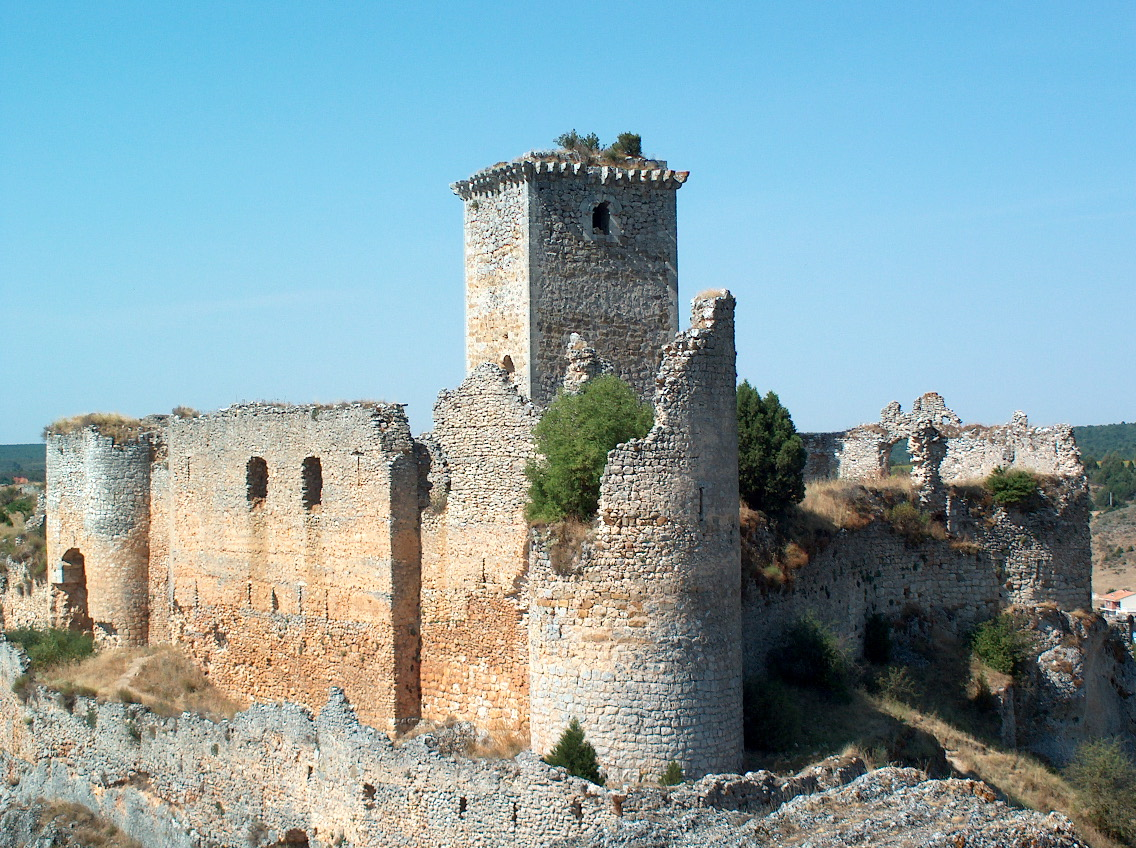
Castle of Ucero

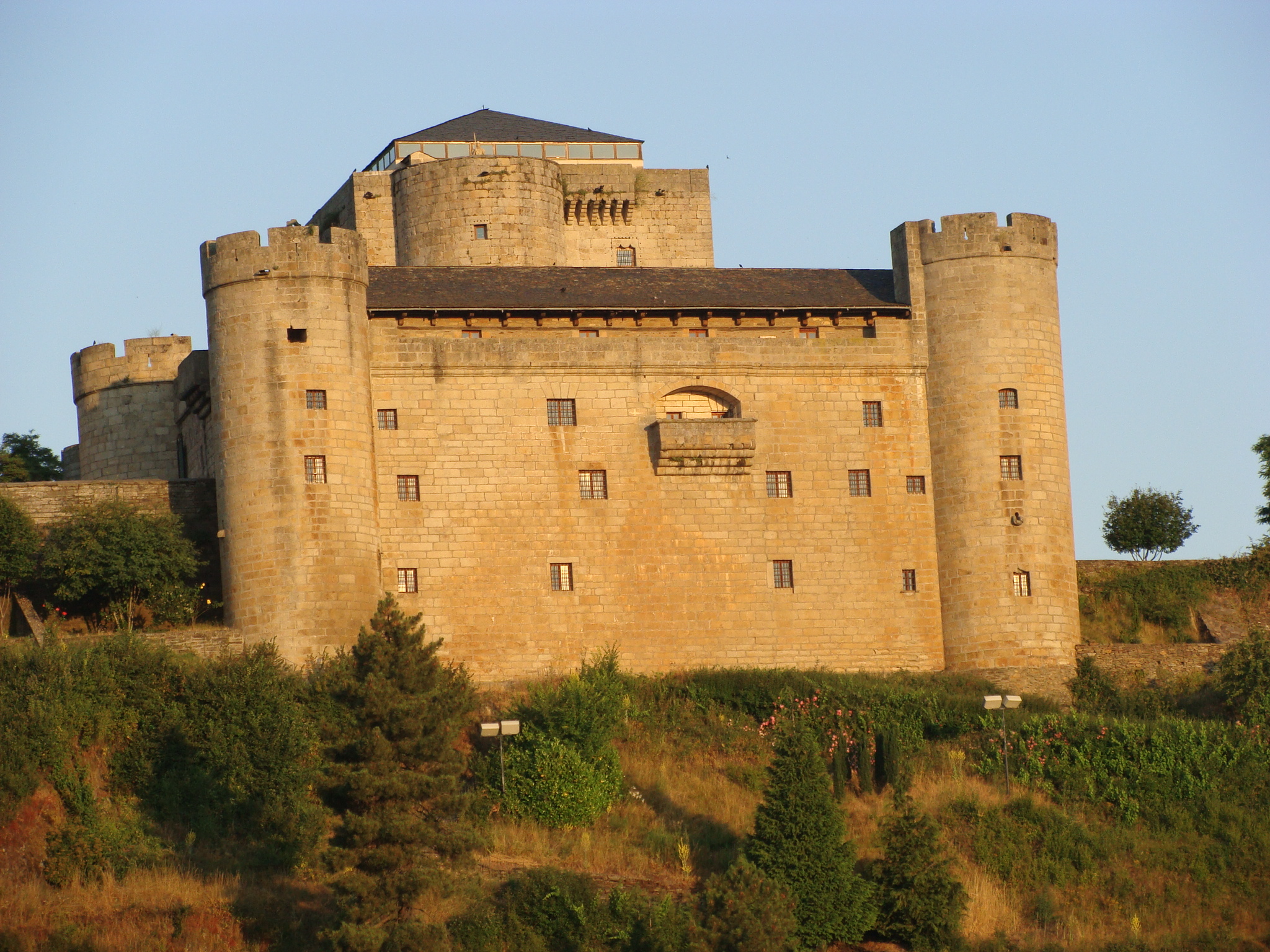
Castle of the Counts of Benavente

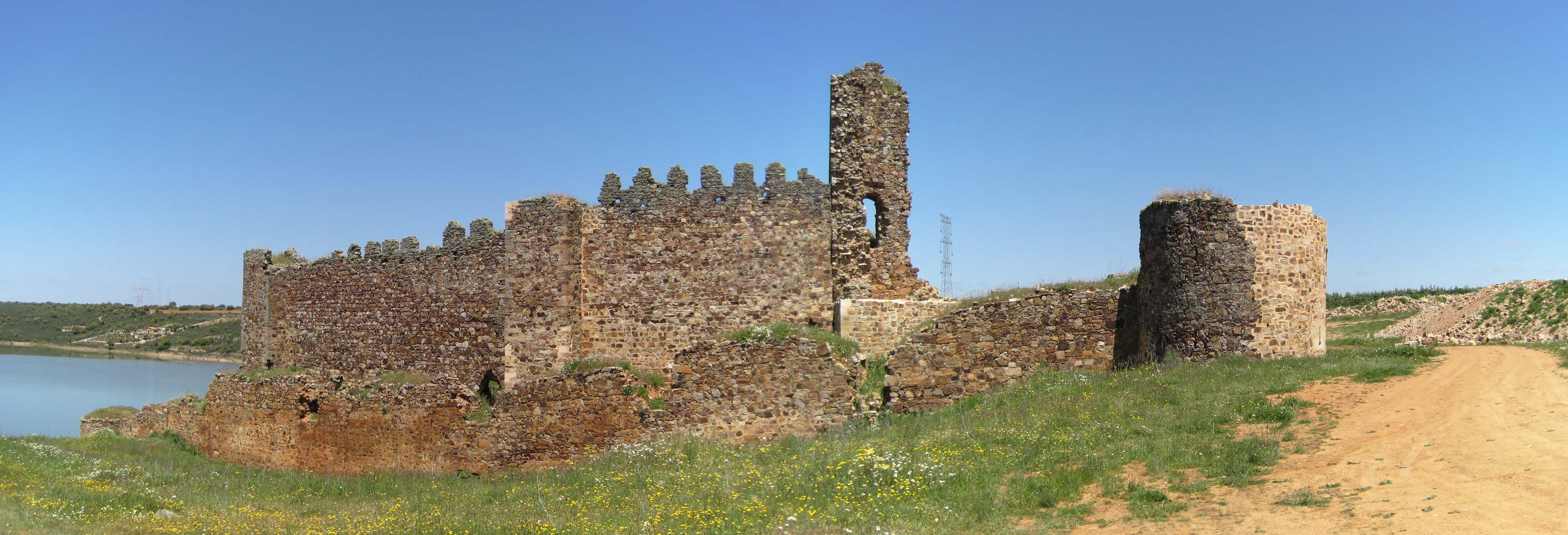
Castle of Castrotorafe

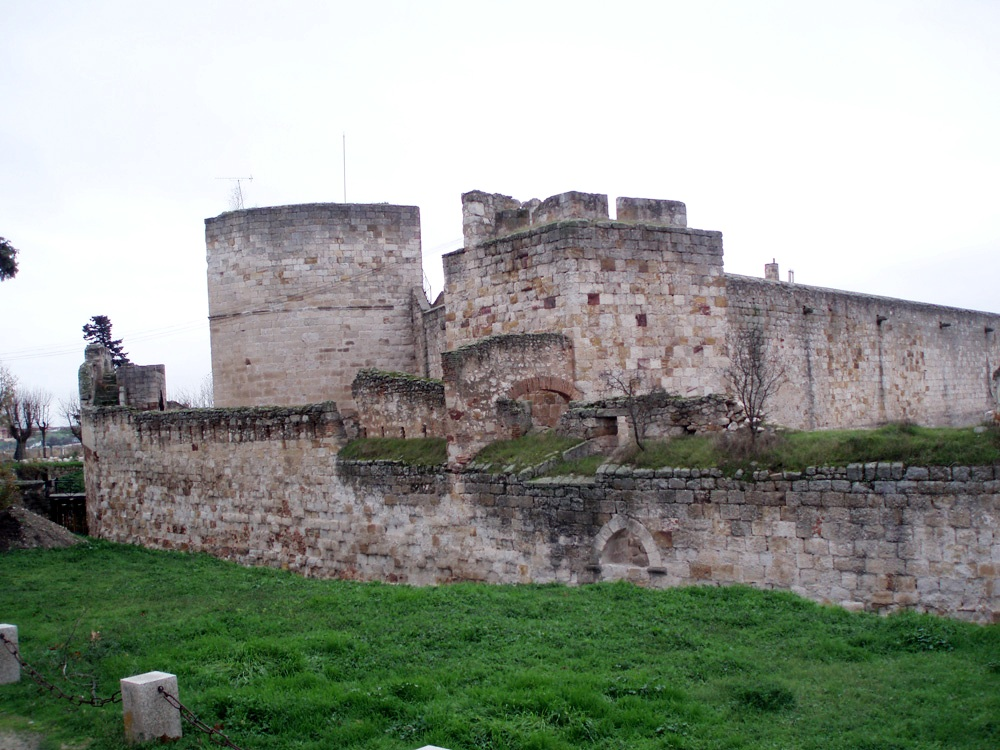
Castle of Zamora

=== Ávila ===
- Castle of La Adrada
- Castle of Don Álvaro de Luna (Arenas de San Pedro)
- Castle of Arévalo
- Castle of the Alcázar (Ávila)
- Castle of El Barco de Ávila
- Castle of Bonilla de la Sierra
- Castle of Zurraquín (Cabezas del Villar)
- Castle of El Mirón
- Castle of Aunqueospese (Mironcillo)
- Castle of Mombeltrán
- Castle of the Duke of Montellano (Narros de Saldueña)
- Castle Count of Rasura (Rasueros)
- Castle of Castronuevo (Rivilla de Barajas)
- Castle of Villaviciosa (Solosancho)
- Castle of Villatoro (Villatoro)
- Castle-Palace of Magalia (Las Navas del Marqués)
- Walls of Ávila

=== Burgos ===
- Castle of Albillos (Villagonzalo-Pedernales)
- Castle of Arenillas de Muñó (Estepar)
- Castle of Belorado
- Castle of Burgos
- Castle of los Cartagena (Olmillos de Sasamón)
- Castle of Castrojeriz
- Castle of Coruña del Conde
- Castle of the Dukes of Frías (Frías)
- Castle of Espinosa de los Monteros (Espinosa de los Monteros)
- Castle of Frías
- Castle of Haza
- Castle of La Loja (Quintana de Valdivieso)
- Castle of Malvecino (Población de Valdivieso)
- Castle of Miranda de Ebro
- Castle of Monastery of Rodilla
- Castle of Olmillos de Sasamón
- Castle of Pancorbo
- Castle of Peñaranda de Duero (Peñaranda de Duero)
- Castle of Picón de Lara (Lara de los Infantes)
- Castle of Poza (Poza de la Sal)
- Castle of Rebolledo (Rebolledo de la Torre)
- Castle of Santa Gadea del Cid
- Castle of Sotopalacios
- Castle of Tedeja (Trespaderne)
- Castle of Torregalindo
- Castle of Torrepadierne (Pampliega)
- Castle of Úrbel (Urbel del Castillo)
- Castle of Villaute (Villaute)
- Castle of Virtus (Virtus)
- Castle of Velasco
- Castle of Zumel
- Fortress of Santa Engracia
- Arco de Santa María
- Tower of Bonifaz (Lomana)
- Tower of Loja
- Walls of Burgos

=== León ===
- Castle of Alba (Llanos de Alba)
- Castle of Alcuetas or Tower of Alcuetas (Villabraz)
- Castle of Alija del Infantado or Castle of los Pimentel (Alija del Infantado)
- Castle of los Álvarez Acebedo (Valdepiélago)
- Castle of Arbolio (Valdepiélago)
- Castle of Aviados (Valdepiélago)
- Castle of Balboa (Balboa)
- Castle of Beñal (Riello)
- Castle of Los Barrios de Gordón (La Pola de Gordón)
- Castle of Castrocalbón (Castrocalbón)
- Castle of Cea (Cea)
- Castle of Cornatel or Castle of Ulver (Priaranza del Bierzo)
- Castle of Corullón (Corullón)
- Castle of Coyanza or Castle of Valencia de Don Juan (Valencia de Don Juan)
- Castle of Ferreras (Valderrueda)
- Castle of Grajal (Grajal de Campos)
- Castle of Laguna de Negrillos (Laguna de Negrillos)
- Castle of Luna (Los Barrios de Luna)
- Castle of Mansilla de las Mulas (Mansilla de las Mulas)
- Castle of Nogarejas (Castrocontrigo)
- Castle of Palacios de Valduerna or Castle of los Bazán (Palacios de la Valduerna)
- Castle of Peñarramiro (Truchas)
- Castle of Ponferrada, Castle of the Templars or Castle del Temple (Ponferrada)
- Castle of Portilla or Castle of the Queen Berenguela (Boca de Huérgano)
- Castle of los Quiñones (Quintana del Marco)
- Castle of Riaño (Riaño)
- Castle of Santa María de Ordás or Tower of Ordás (Santa María de Ordás)
- Castle of Sarracín, Castle of Vega de Valcarce or Castrum Sarracenicum (Vega de Valcarce)
- Castle of Siero (Siero de la Reina, Boca de Huérgano)
- Castle of Tapia or Tower of Tapia (Rioseco de Tapia)
- Castle of the Towers, Puerta Castillo or Arco de la Cárcel (León)
- Castle of Villalobos (Valderas)
- Castle of Villanueva de Jamuz (Santa Elena de Jamuz)
- Castle of Villapadierna (Cubillas de Rueda)
- Castle of Turienzo or Tower of los Osorio (Turienzo de los Caballeros)
- Castle-Palace de los Quiñones (San Emiliano)
- Castle-Palace of los Marqueses de Villafranca (Villafranca del Bierzo)
- Castle-Palace of Renedo de Valdetuéjar (Renedo de Valdetuéjar)
- Castle-Palace of Almanza (Almanza)
- Castle-Palace of los Guzmanes (Toral de los Guzmanes)
- Castle-Palace of los Tovar or Torreón of los Tovar (Boca de Huérgano)
- Tower of Babia (Babia)
- Tower of Canseco (Canseco, Cármenes)
- Tower of Fresno de la Valduerna (Villamontán de la Valduerna)
- Tower of Laguna de Somoza (Val de San Lorenzo)
- Tower of Puebla de Lillo (Puebla de Lillo)
- Tower of La Vecilla (La Vecilla de Curueño)
- Tower of La Vid (La Pola de Gordón)

=== Palencia ===
- Castle of Abia de las Torres
- Castle of Aguilar de Campoo
- Castle of Ampudia
- Castle of Amusco
- Castle of Antigüedad
- Castle of Astudillo
- Castle of Autilla del Pino
- Castle of Autillo de Campos
- Castle of Belmonte de Campos (Belmonte de Campos)
- Castle of Agüero (Buenavista de Valdavia)
- Castle of Castrillo de Villavega
- Castle of las Cabañas de Castilla
- Castle of Sarmiento (Fuentes de Valdepero)
- Castle of Monzón de Campos
- Castle of Gama
- Castle of Hornillos de Cerrato
- Castle of Palenzuela
- Castle of the Counts of Saldaña
- Castle of la Estrella de Campos (Torremormojón)
- Castle of Valderrábano
- Castle of Villanueva de la Torre (Barruelo de Santullán)

=== Salamanca ===
- Alcázar of Salamanca
- Castle of Ledesma
- Castle of Alba de Tormes
- Castle of Ciudad Rodrigo or Castle of Henry II of Castile
- Castle of Ledesma
- Castle of Sobradillo
- Castle of Béjar
- Castle of Miranda del Castañar
- Castle of Monleón
- Castle of Montemayor del Río
- Castle of Puente del Congosto
- Castle of San Felices de los Gallegos
- Castle del Buen Amor or Castle of Villanueva de Cañedo
- Castle of San Martín del Castañar
- Royal Fortress of the Concepcion or Castillo de Aldea del Obispo

=== Segovia ===
- Alcázar of Segovia
- Castle of Castilnovo
- Castle of Coca (Coca)
- Castle of Cuéllar
- Castle of Pedraza (Pedraza)
- Castle of Turégano

=== Soria ===
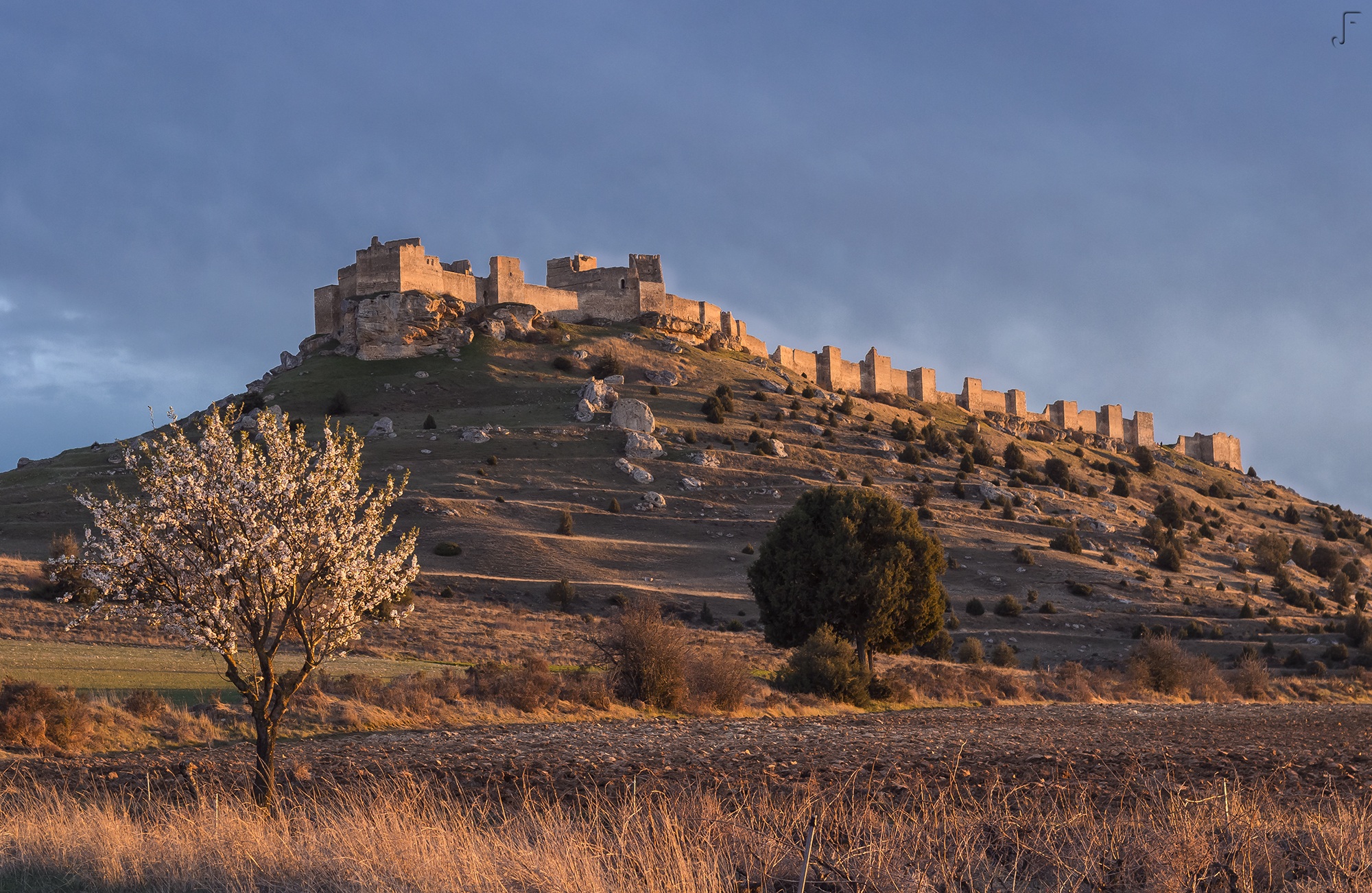
Castle of Gormaz, Soria

- Castle of Almenar (Almenar de Soria)
- Castle of Berlanga (Berlanga de Duero)
- Castle of Osma (El Burgo de Osma)
- Castle of Calatañazor
- Castle of Caracena
- Castle of Gormaz
- Castle of Hinojosa de la Sierra
- Castle of Magaña
- Castle of Medinaceli
- Castle of Monteagudo de las Vicarías
- Castle of Montuenga
- Castle of Peñalcázar
- Castle of la Raya (Monteagudo de la Vicarías)
- Castle of Rello
- Castle of San Leonardo (San Leonardo de Yagüe)
- Castle of San Pedro Manrique
- Castle of Somaén
- Castle of Soria
- Castle of Ucero
- Castle of Yanguas
- Fortress of Serón de Nágima
- Arab Walls of Ágreda

=== Valladolid ===
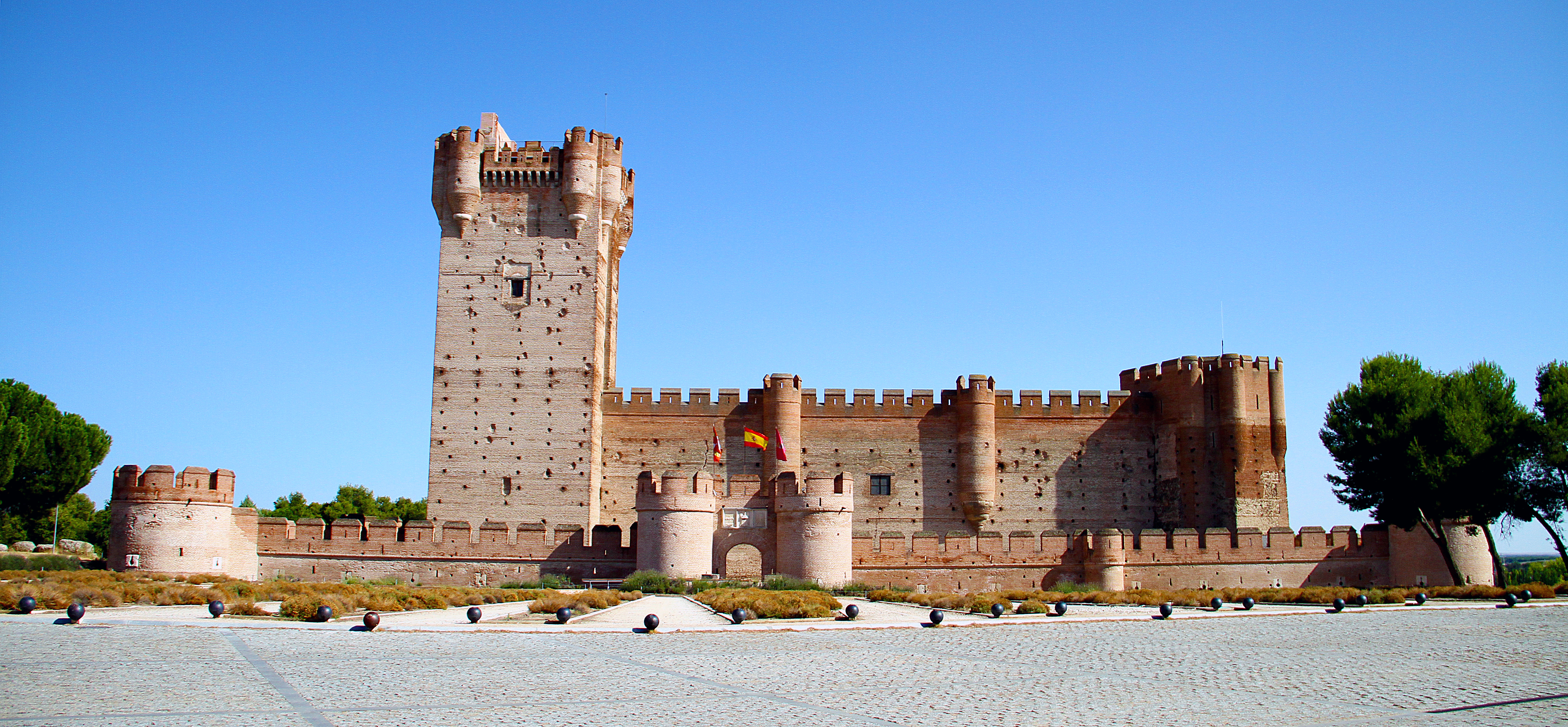
Castle of La Mota

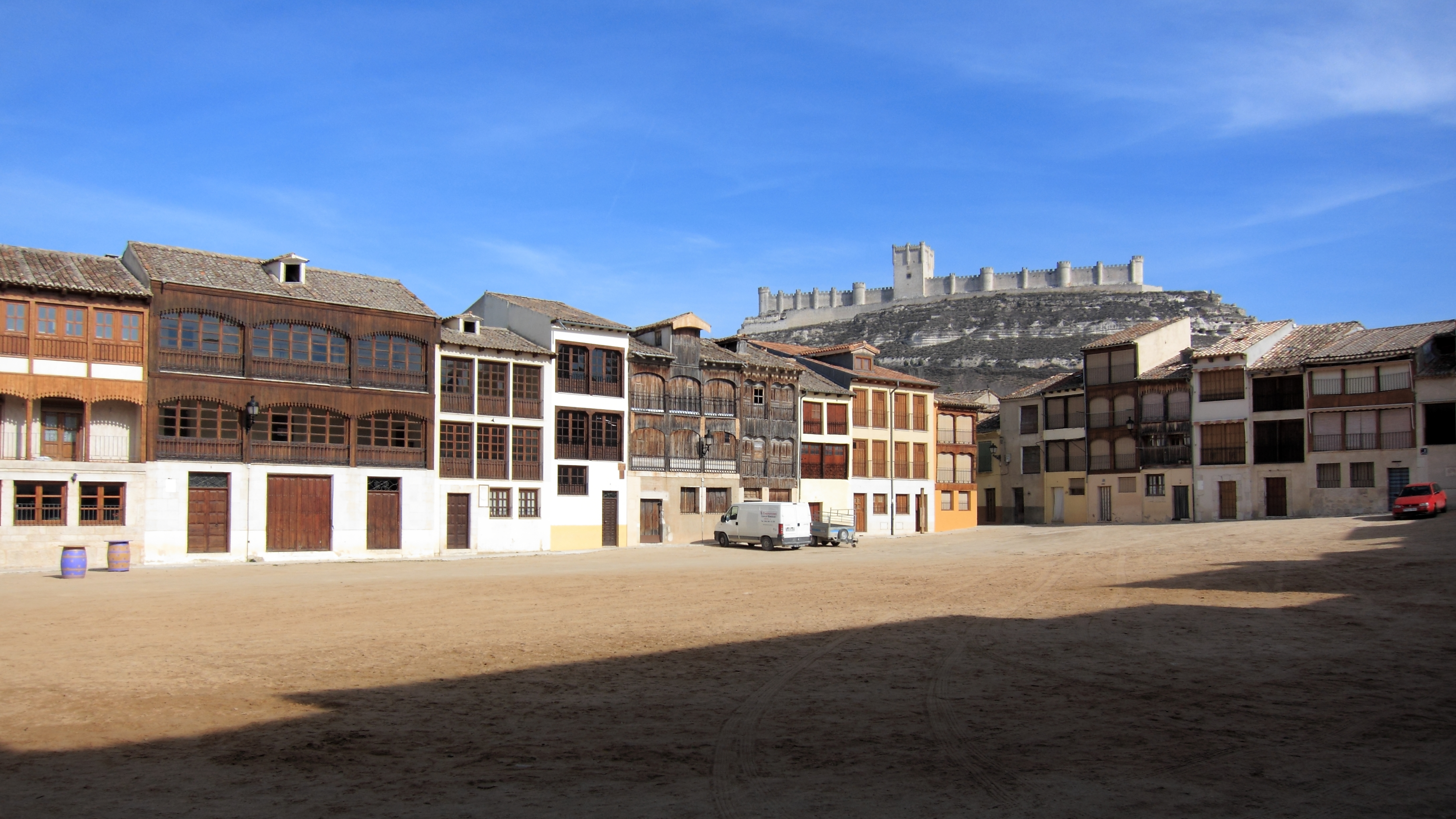
Castle of Peñafiel, view from Plaza del Coso

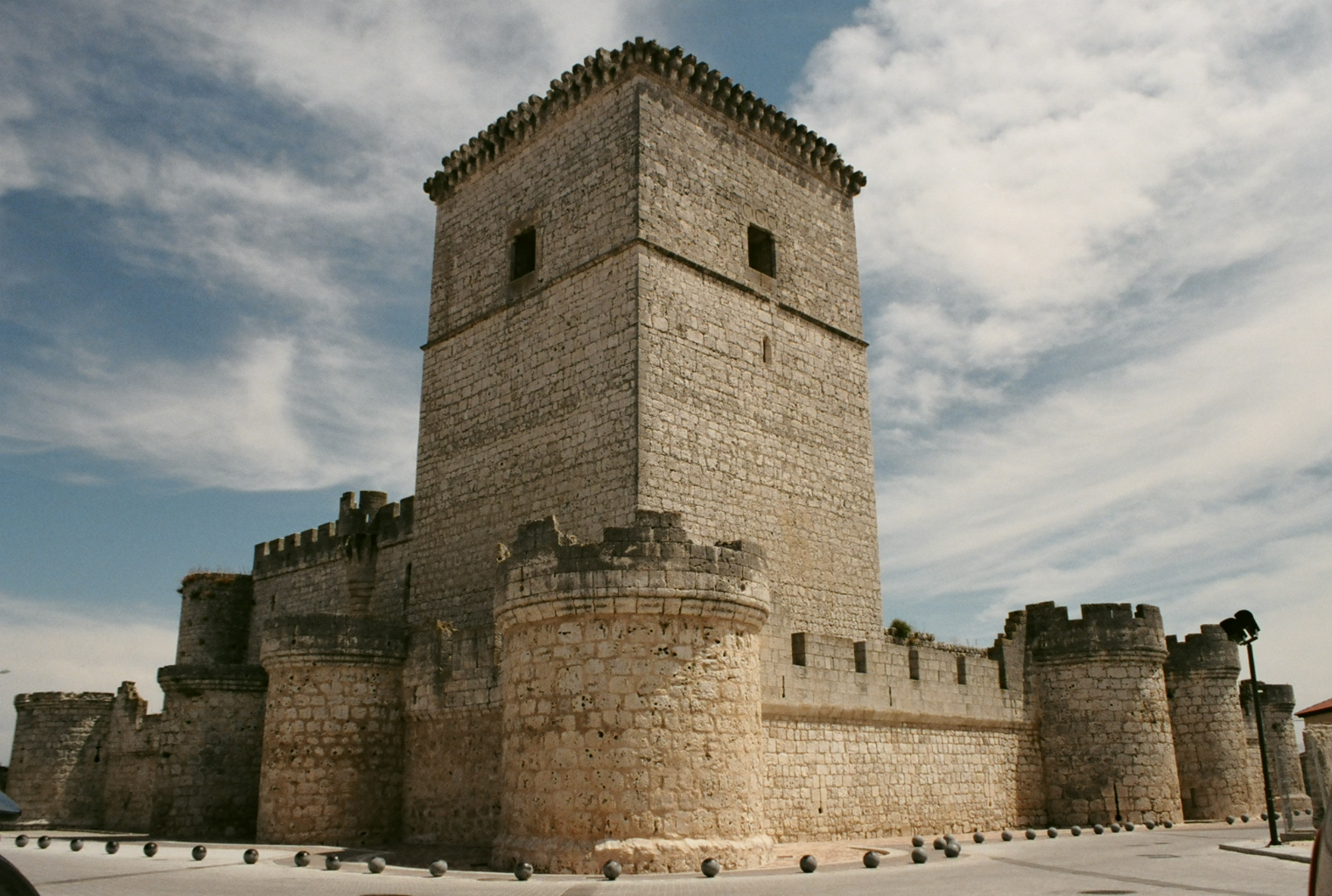
Portillo Castle

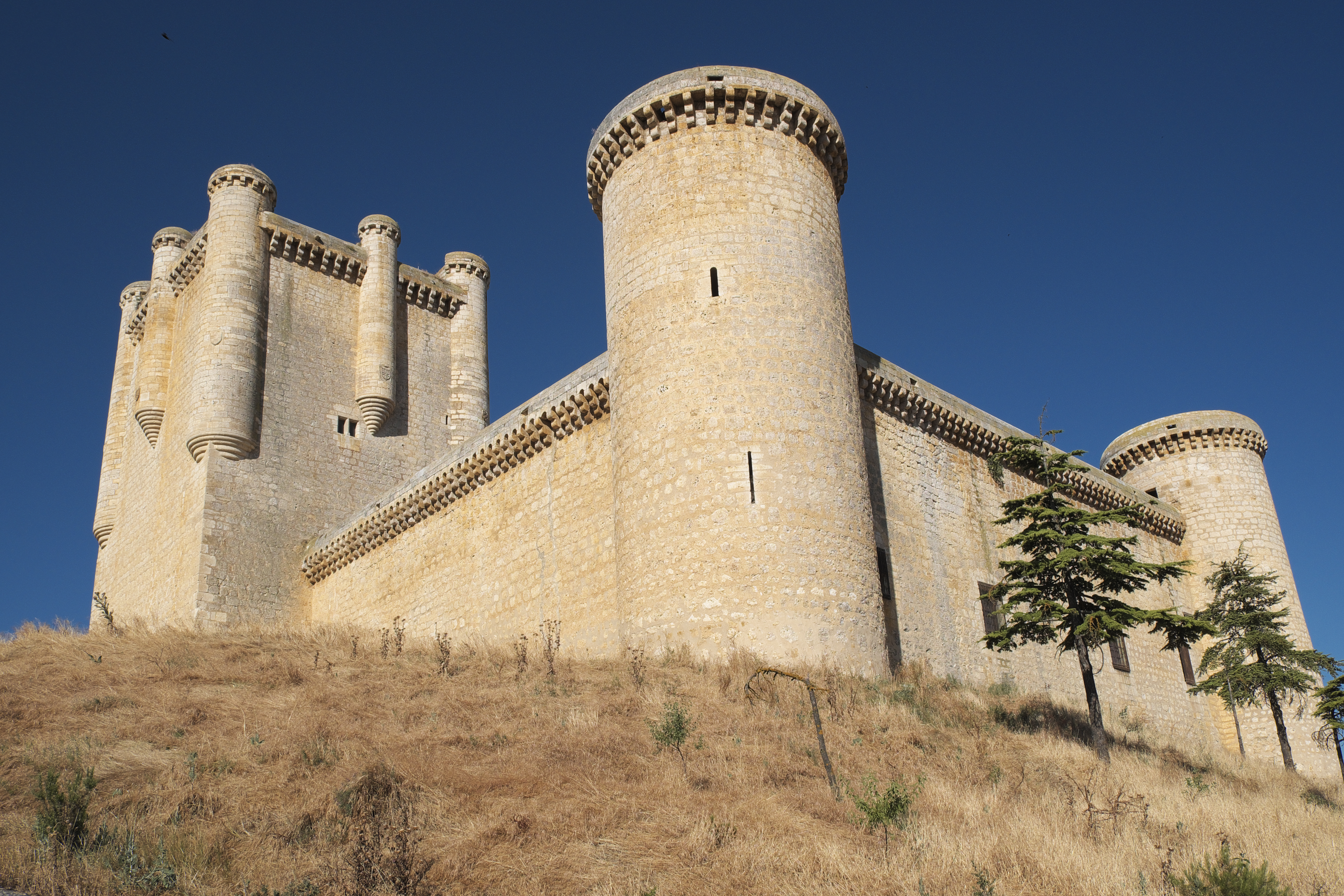
Castle of Torrelobatón

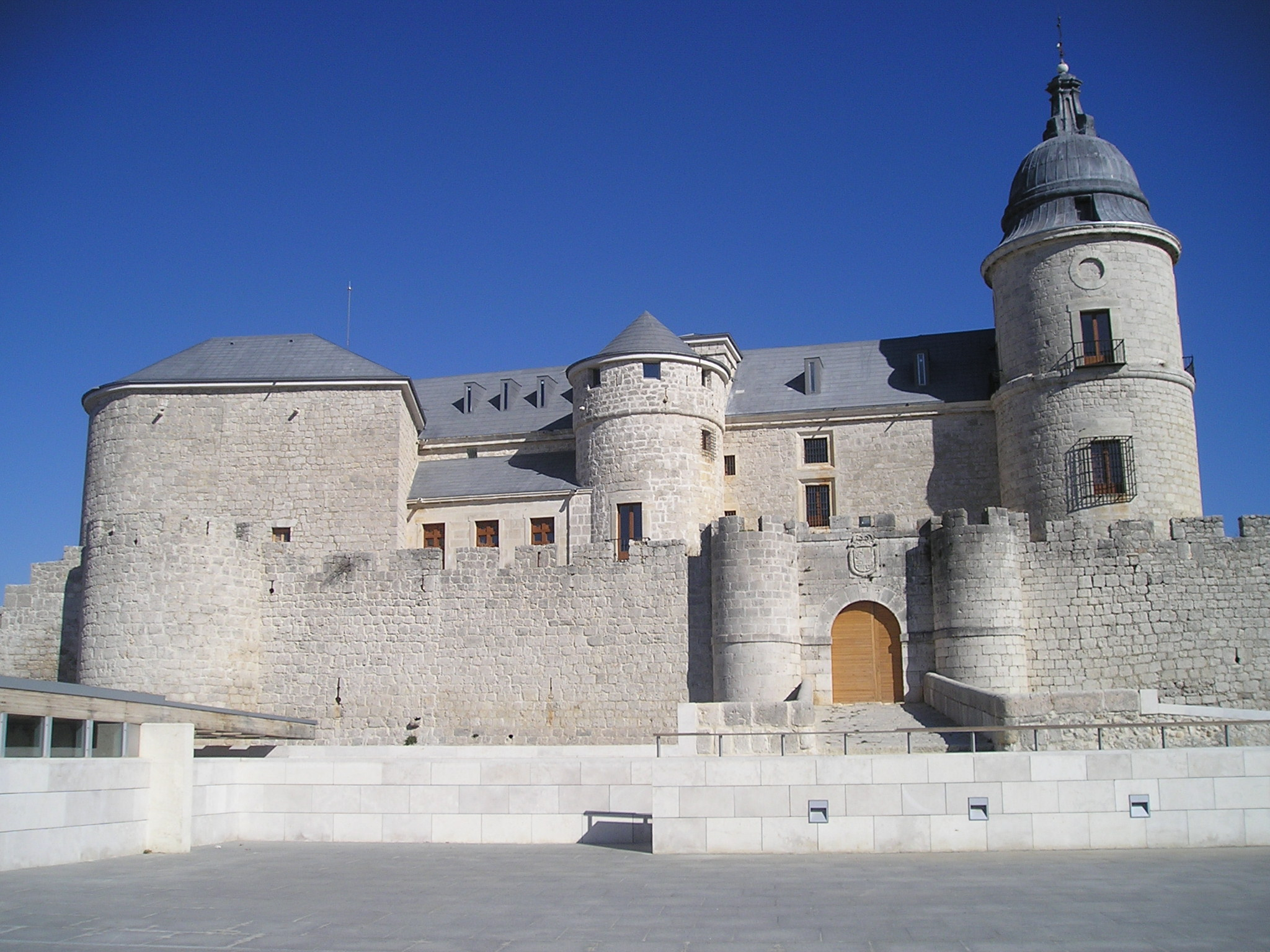
Simancas Castle

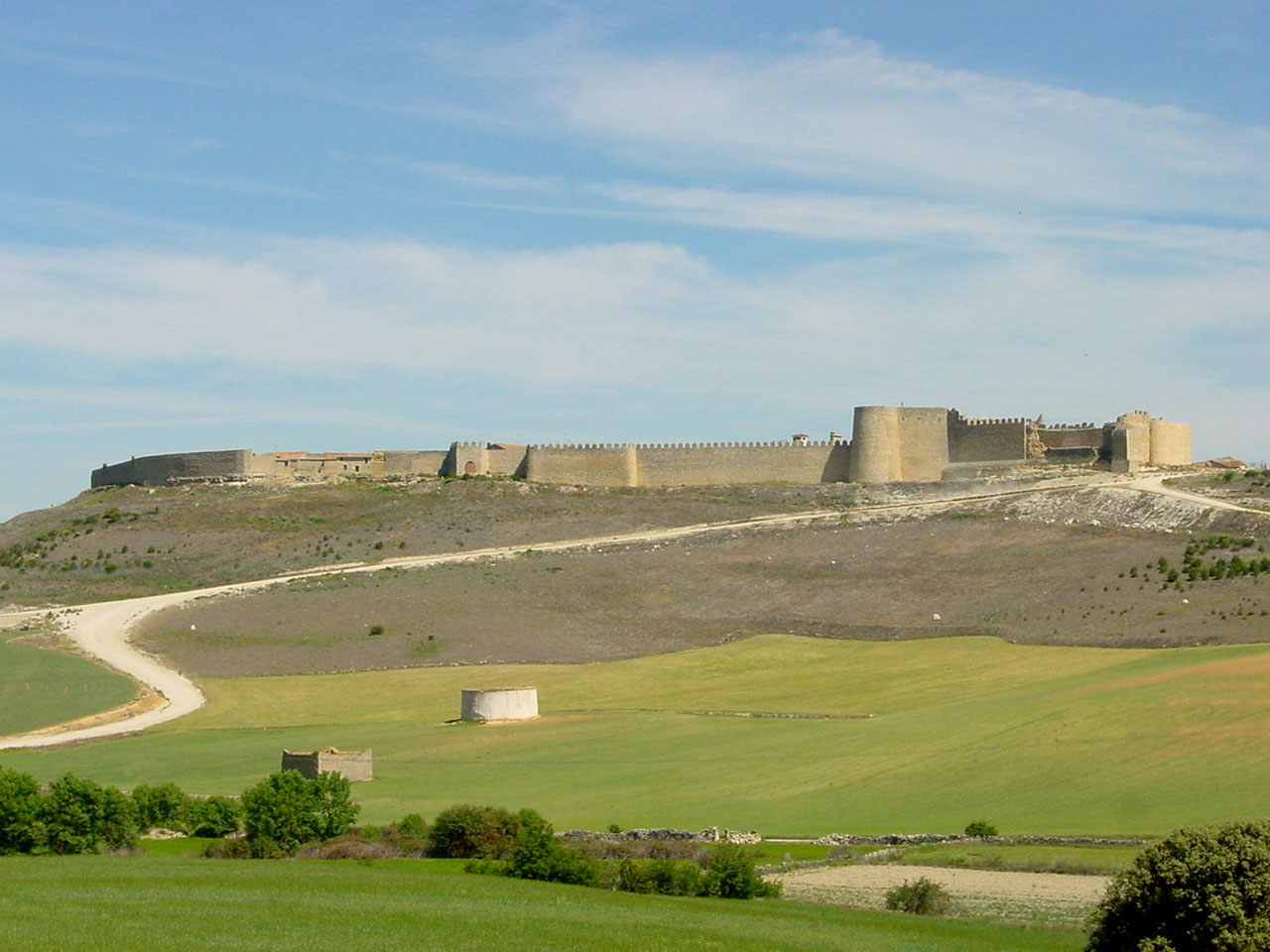
Walls of Urueña, a medieval town

- Castle of Alaejos
- Castle of Barcial de la Loma
- Castle of Canillas de Esgueva
- Castle of Castromembibre
- Castle of Castroverde de Cerrato
- Castle of Curiel de Duero
- Castle of Encinas de Esgueva
- Castle of Foncastín
- Castle of Fuensaldaña (Fuensaldaña)
- Castle of Fuente el Sol
- Castle of Íscar
- Castle of La Mota
- Castle of Montealegre de Campos (Montealegre de Campos)
- Castle of Mucientes
- Castle of Peñafiel
- Castle of Portillo
- Castle of San Pedro de Latarce
- Castle of Simancas (Simancas)
- Castle of Tiedra
- Castle of Tordehumos
- Castle of Torrelobatón (Torrelobatón)
- Castle of Trigueros del Valle
- Castle of Urueña (Urueña)
- Castle of Villafuerte de Esgueva
- Castle of Villagarcia de Campos
- Castle of Villalba de los Alcores
- Castle of Villavellid
- Castle-Palace of Curiel de Duero or Castle-Palace of los Zúñiga
- Walls of Curiel de Duero (Curiel de Duero)
- Walls of Mayorga (Mayorga)
- Walls of Medina de Rioseco (Medina de Rioseco)
- Walls of Medina del Campo (Medina del Campo)
- Walls of Olmedo (Olmedo)
- Walls of Peñafiel (Peñafiel)
- Walls of Portillo (Portillo)
- Walls of Tordesillas (Tordesillas)
- Walls of Torrelobatón (Torrelobatón)
- Walls of Tudela de Duero (Tudela de Duero)
- Walls of Urueña (Urueña)
- Walls of Valbuena de Duero (Valbuena de Duero)
- Walls of Valladolid (Valladolid)
- Walls of Villabrágima (Villabrágima)
- Walls of Villalba de los Alcores (Villalba de los Alcores)

=== Zamora ===
- Álcazar of Toro
- Castle of Asmesnal or Castle of Alfaraz
- Castle of Alcañices
- Castle of Alba (Losacino)
- Castle of the Counts of Benavente
- Castle of Castrotorafe
- Castle of Fermoselle
- Castle of Granucillo
- Castle of Peñausende
- Castle of Puebla de Sanabria
- Castle of Villalonso
- Castle of Villalpando
- Castle of Villa Ceide
- Castle of Zamora
- Torreón of Ayoó de Vidriales
- Tower del Caracol
- Walls of Zamora

== Castile-La Mancha ==
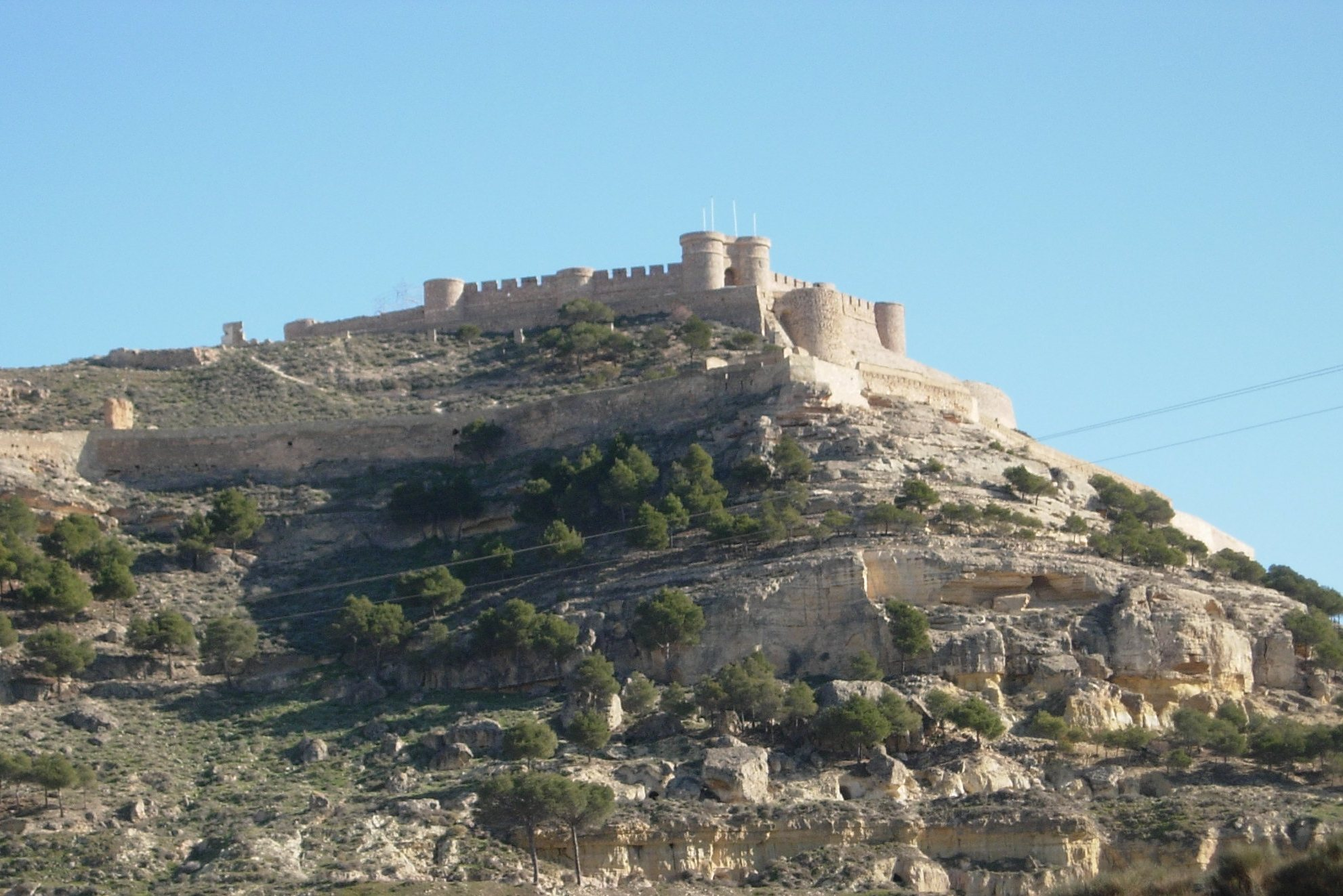
Castle of Chinchilla de Montearagón

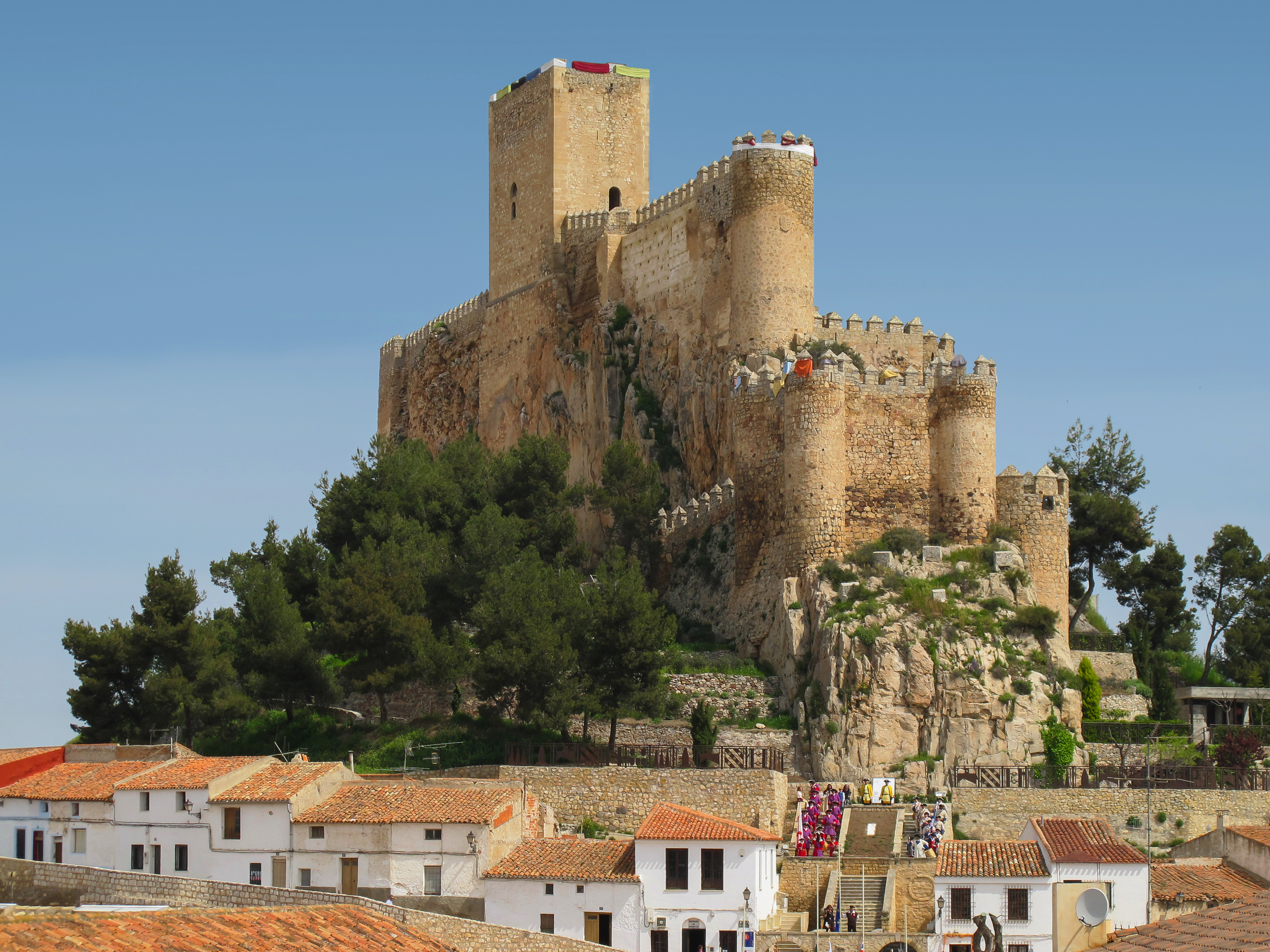
Castle of Almansa.

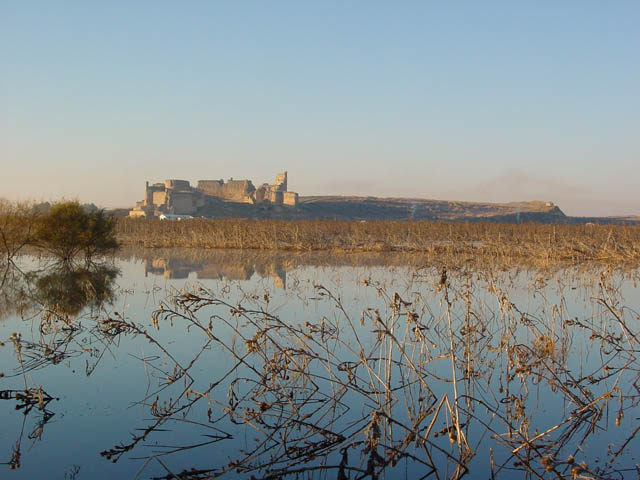
Castle of Calatrava la Vieja

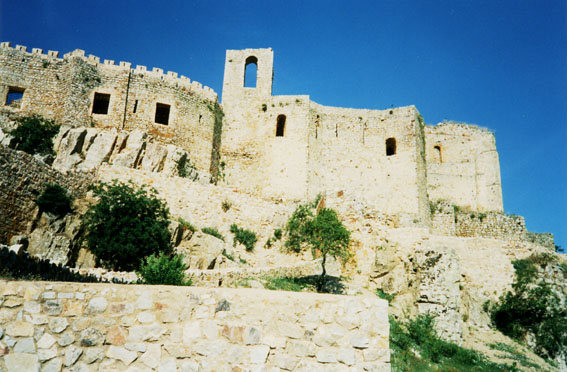
Castle-Convent of Calatrava la Nueva

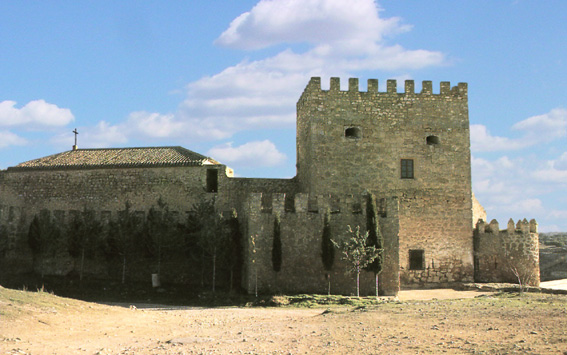
Castle of Peñarroya

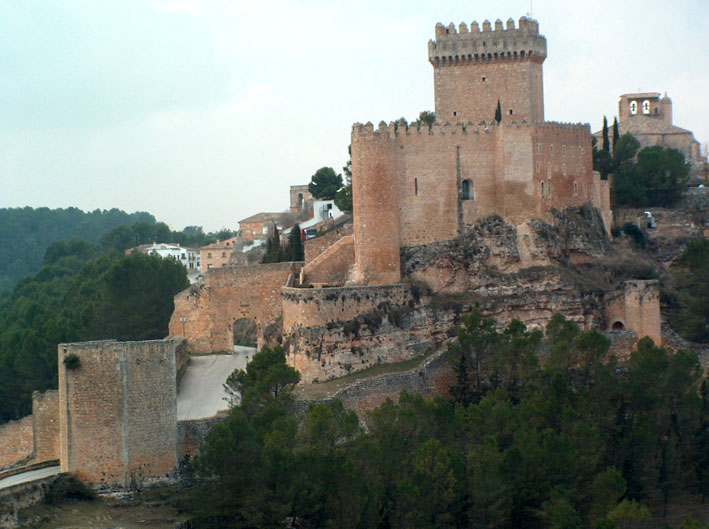
Castle of Alarcón

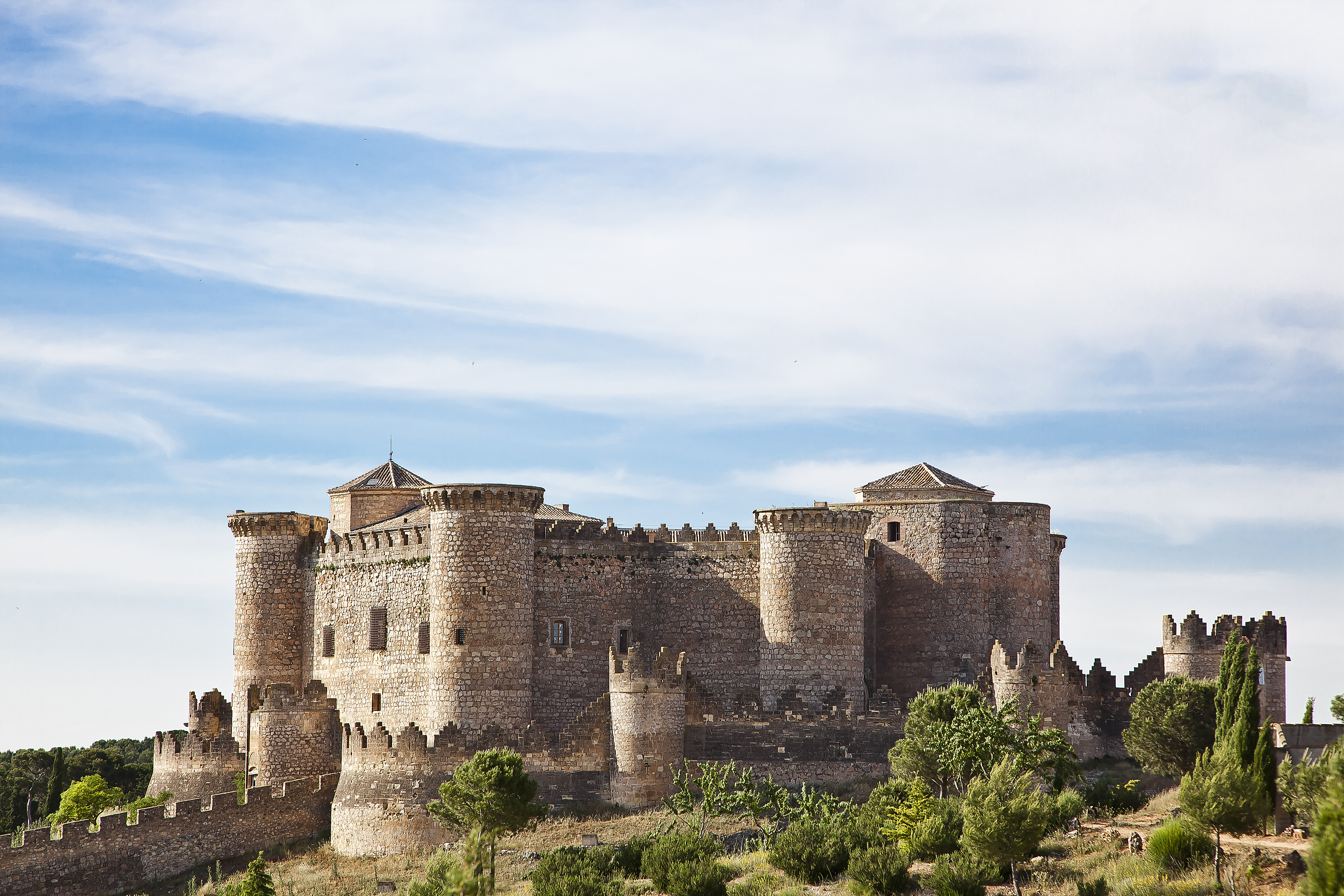
Castle of Belmonte

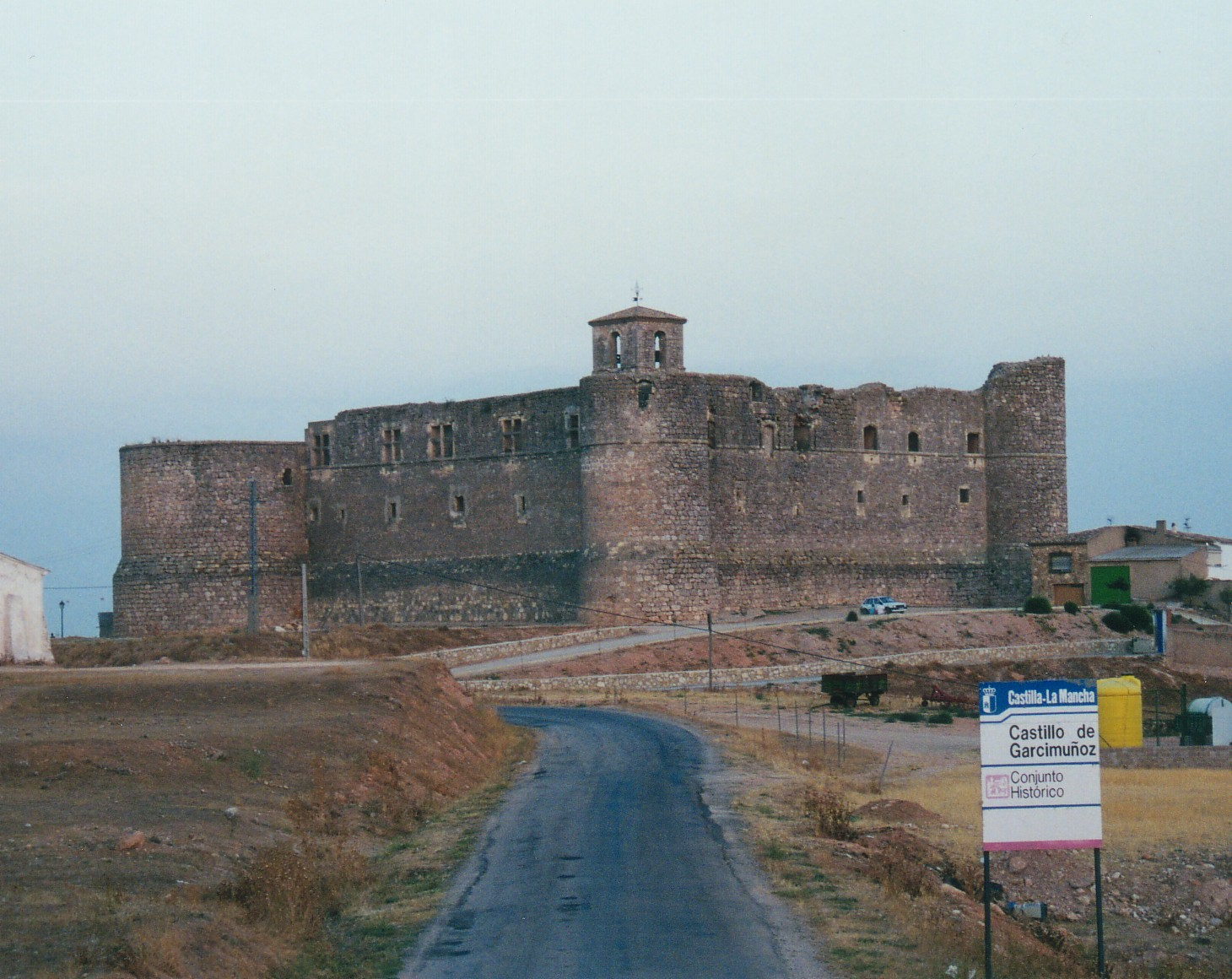
Castle of Garcimuñoz

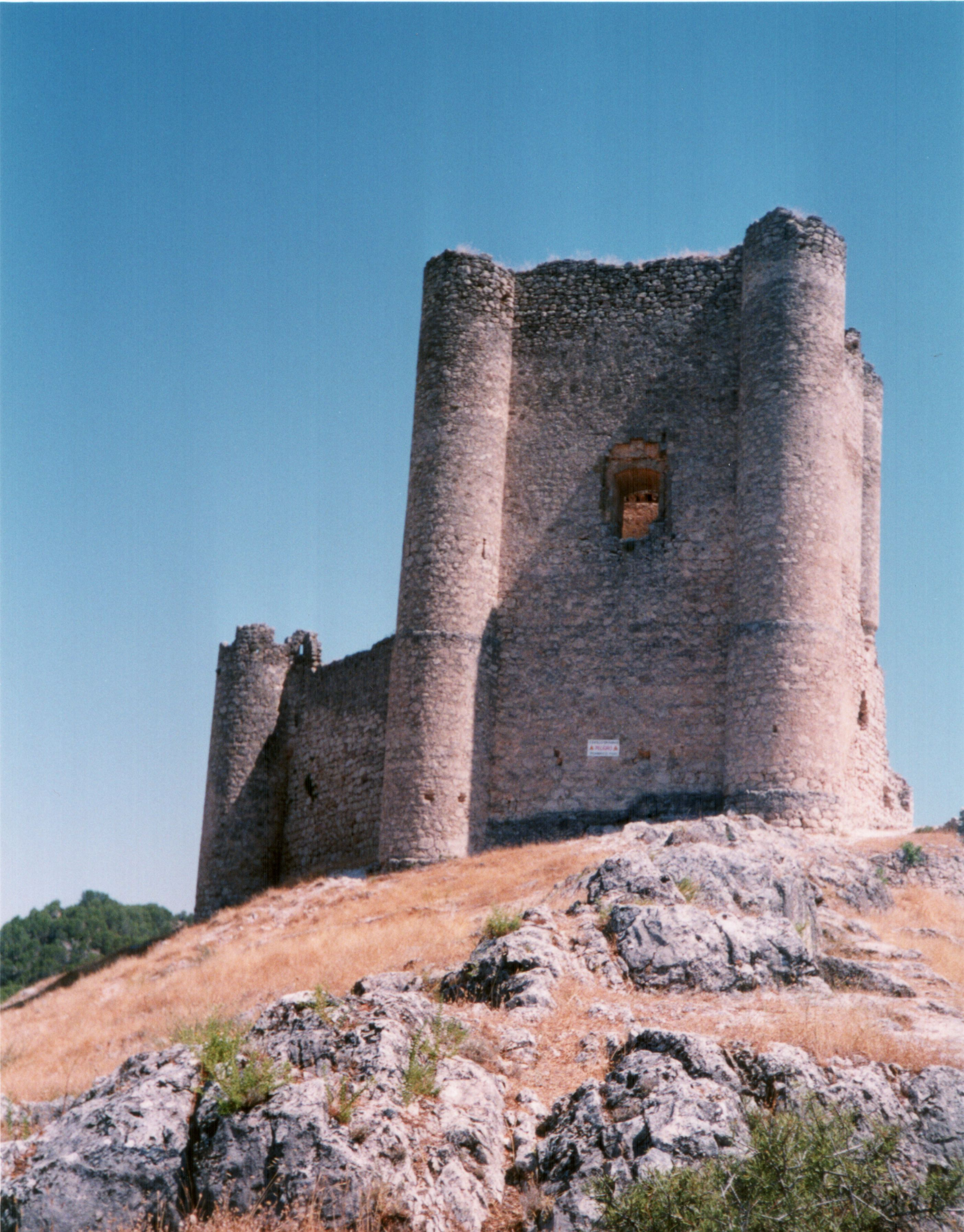
Castle of Anguix

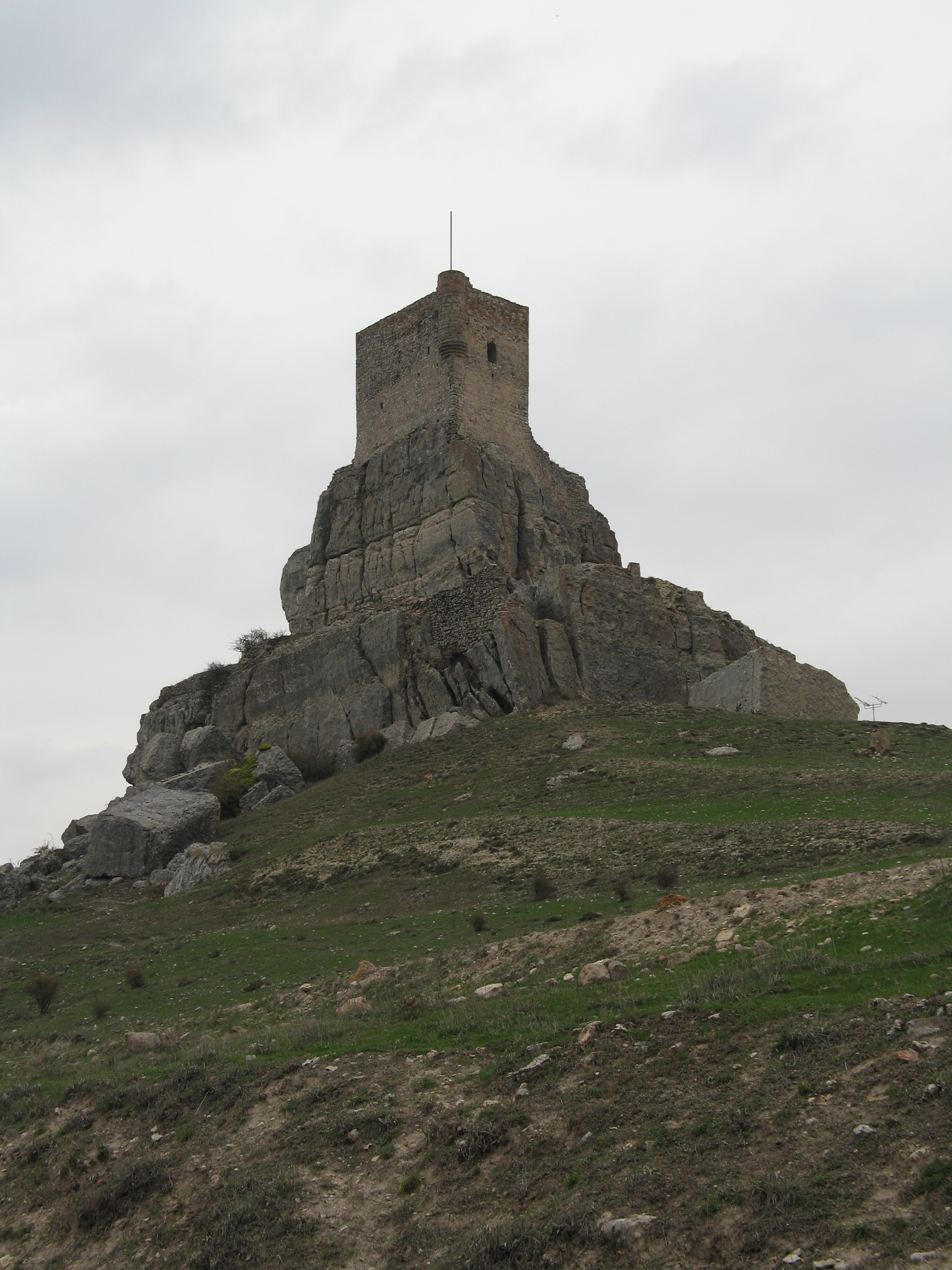
Castle of Atienza

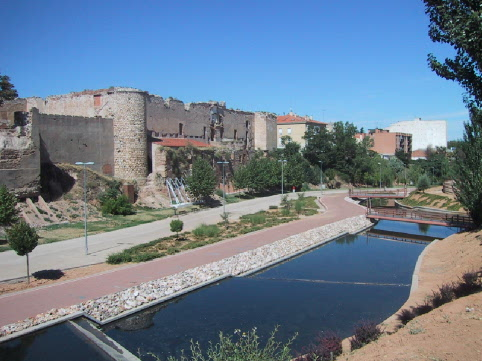
Alcázar Real of Guadalajara

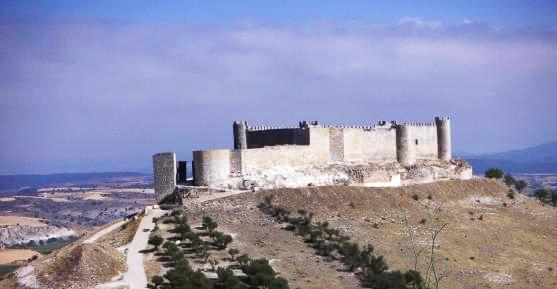
Castle of the Cid

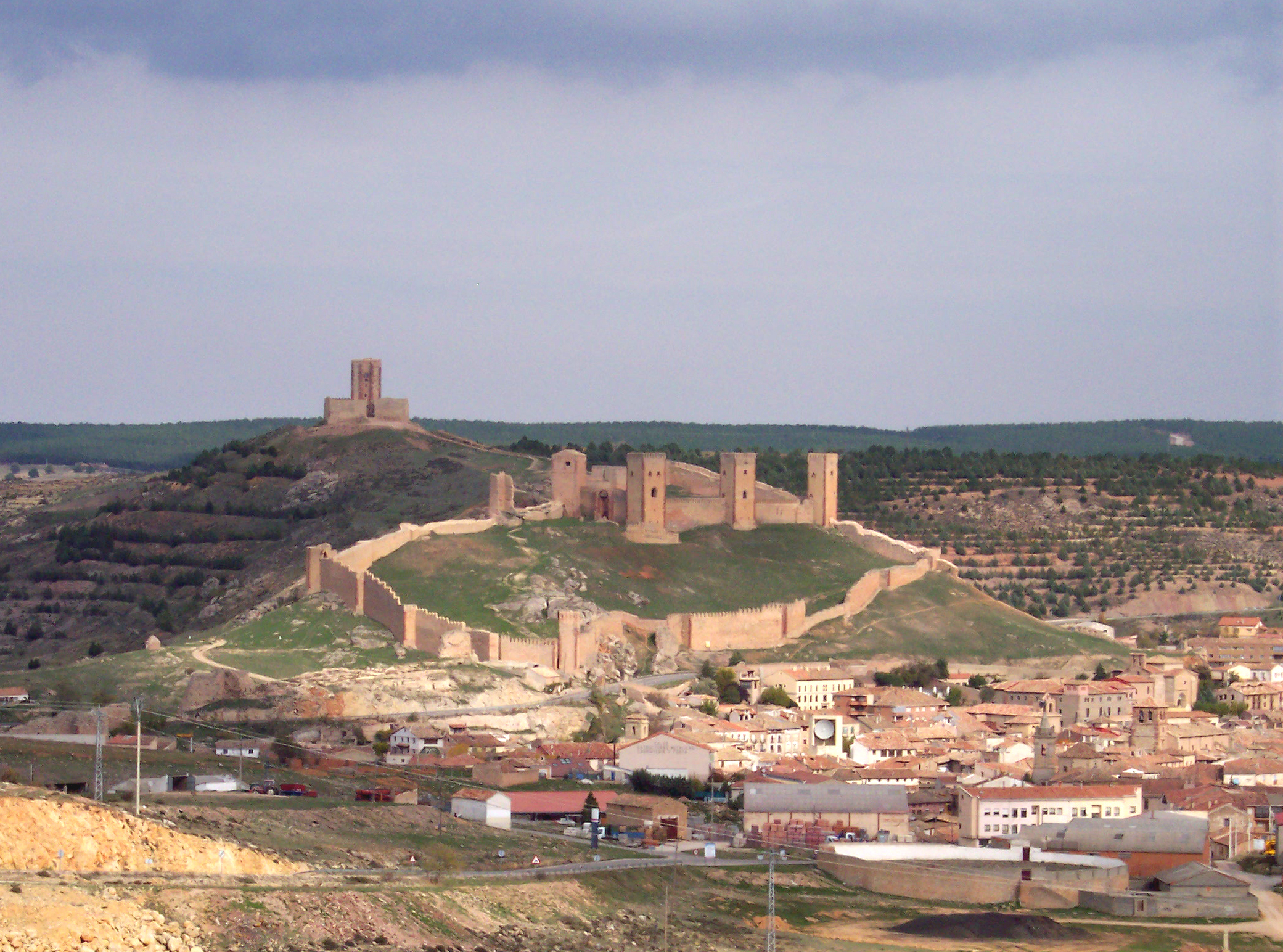
Castle of Molina de Aragón

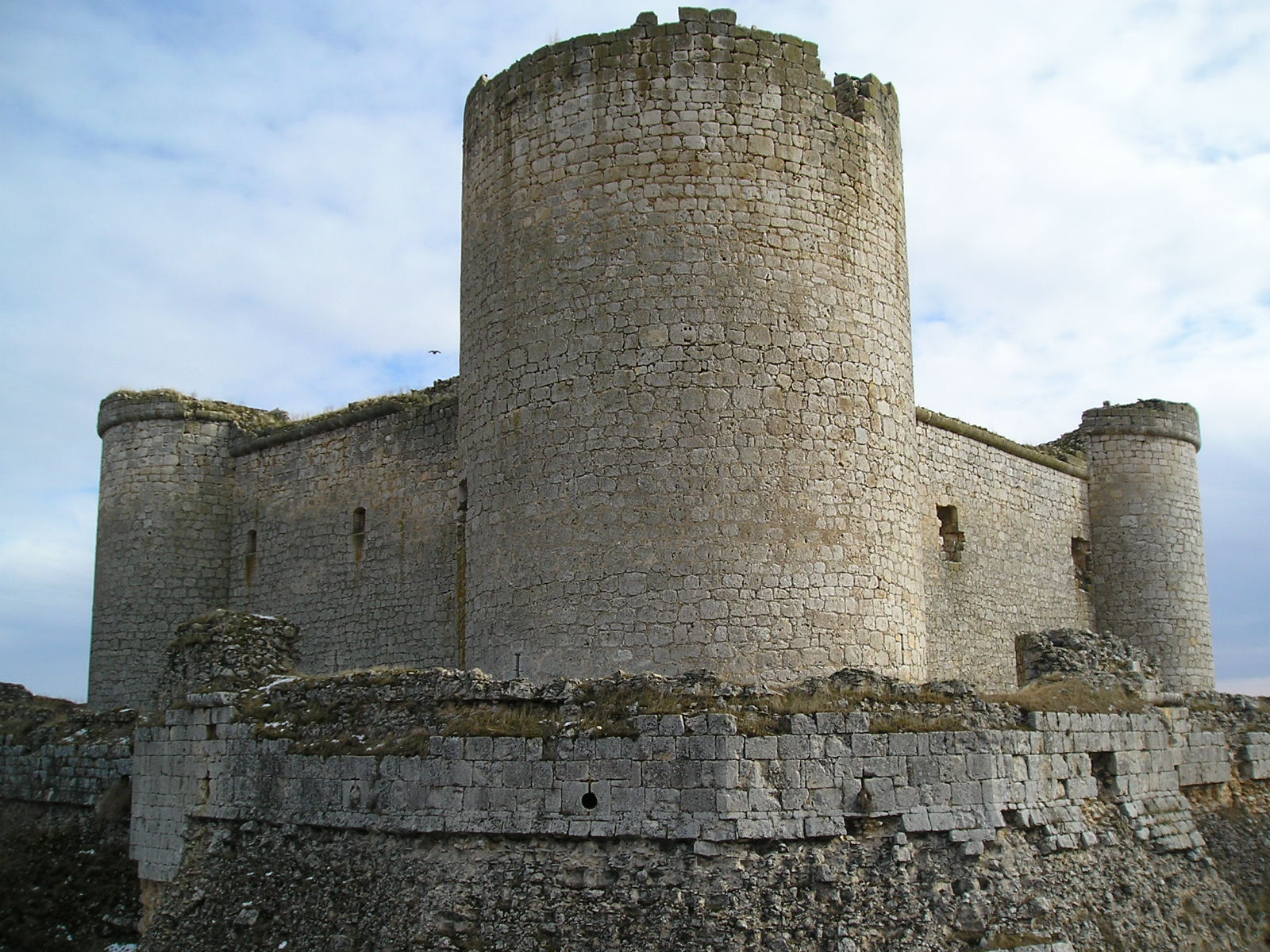
Castle of Pioz

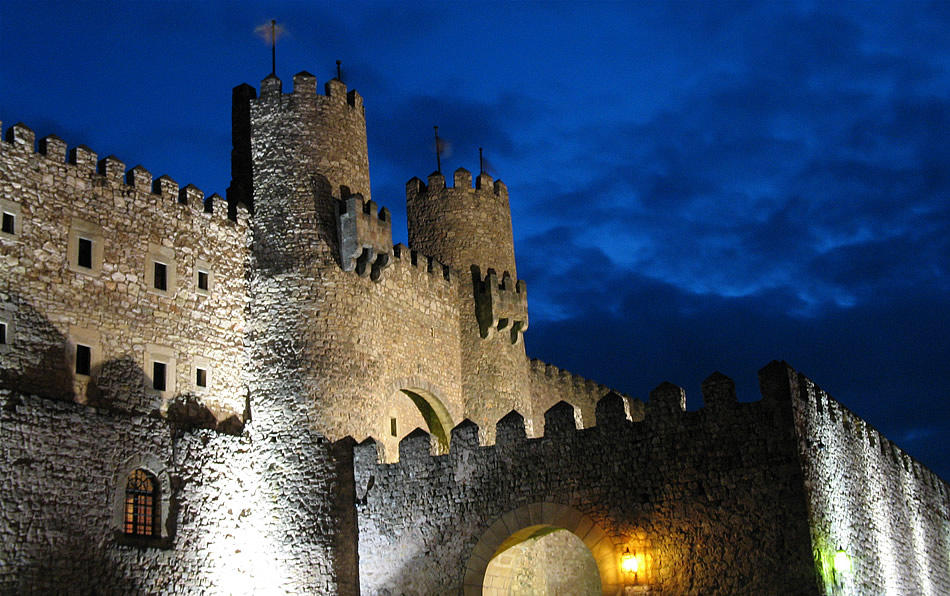
Castle of Sigüenza

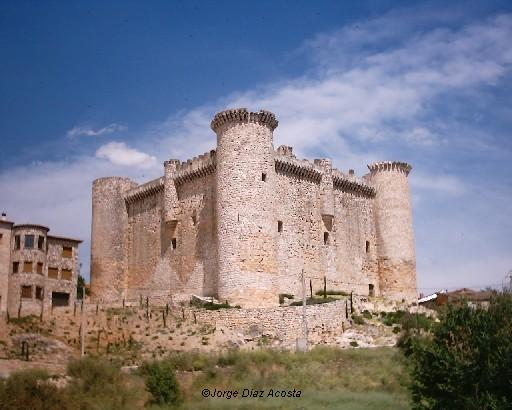
Castle of Torija

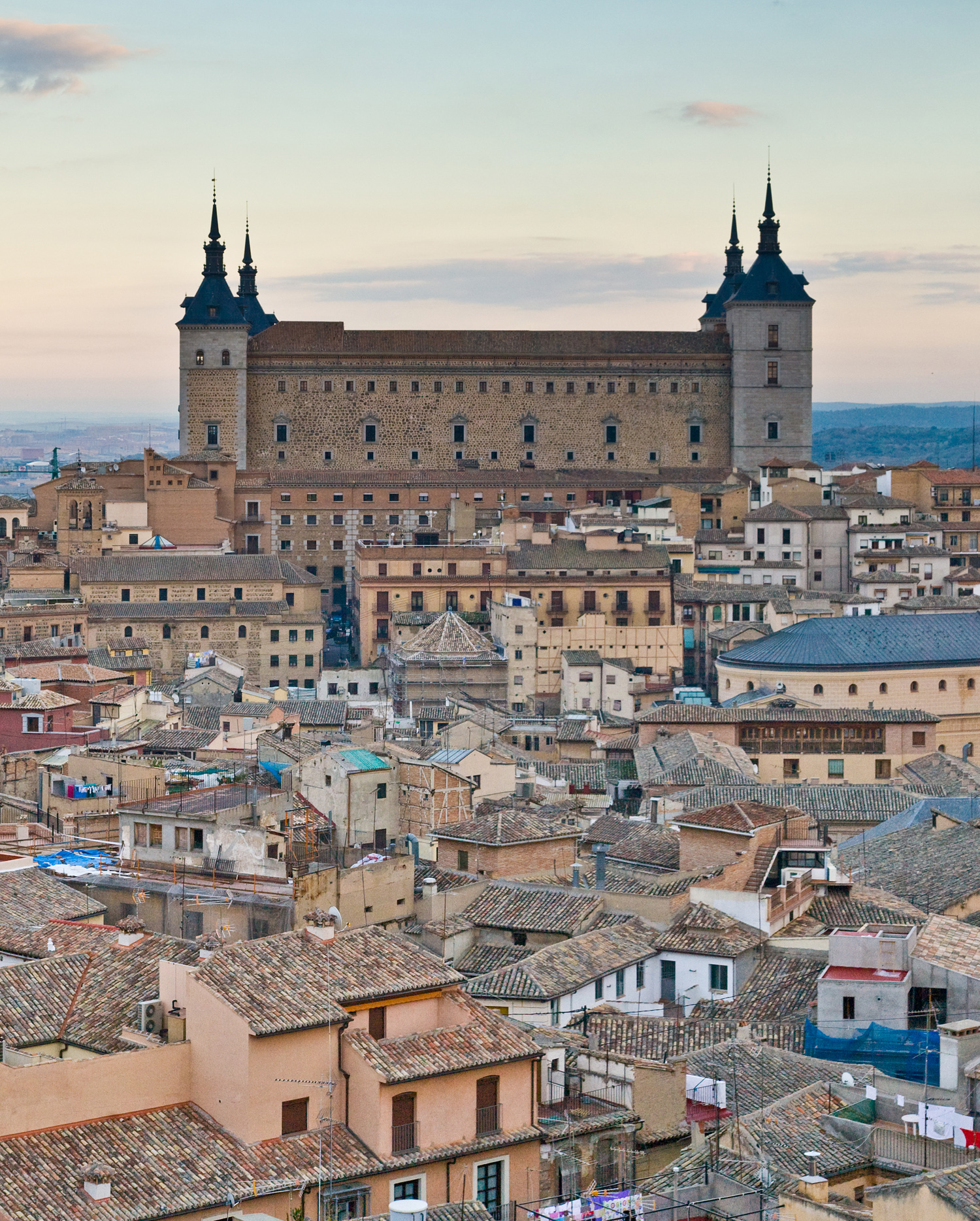
Alcázar of Toledo

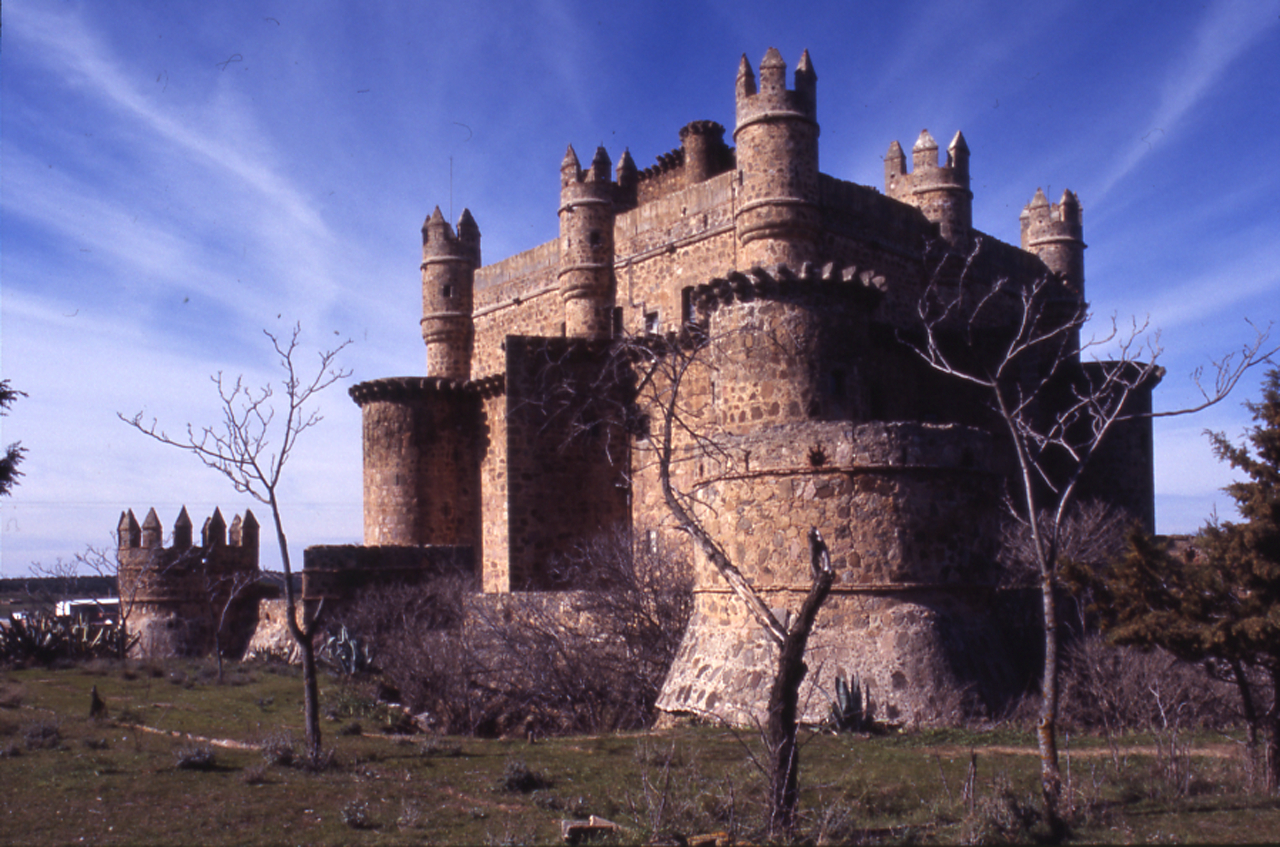
Castle of Guadamur

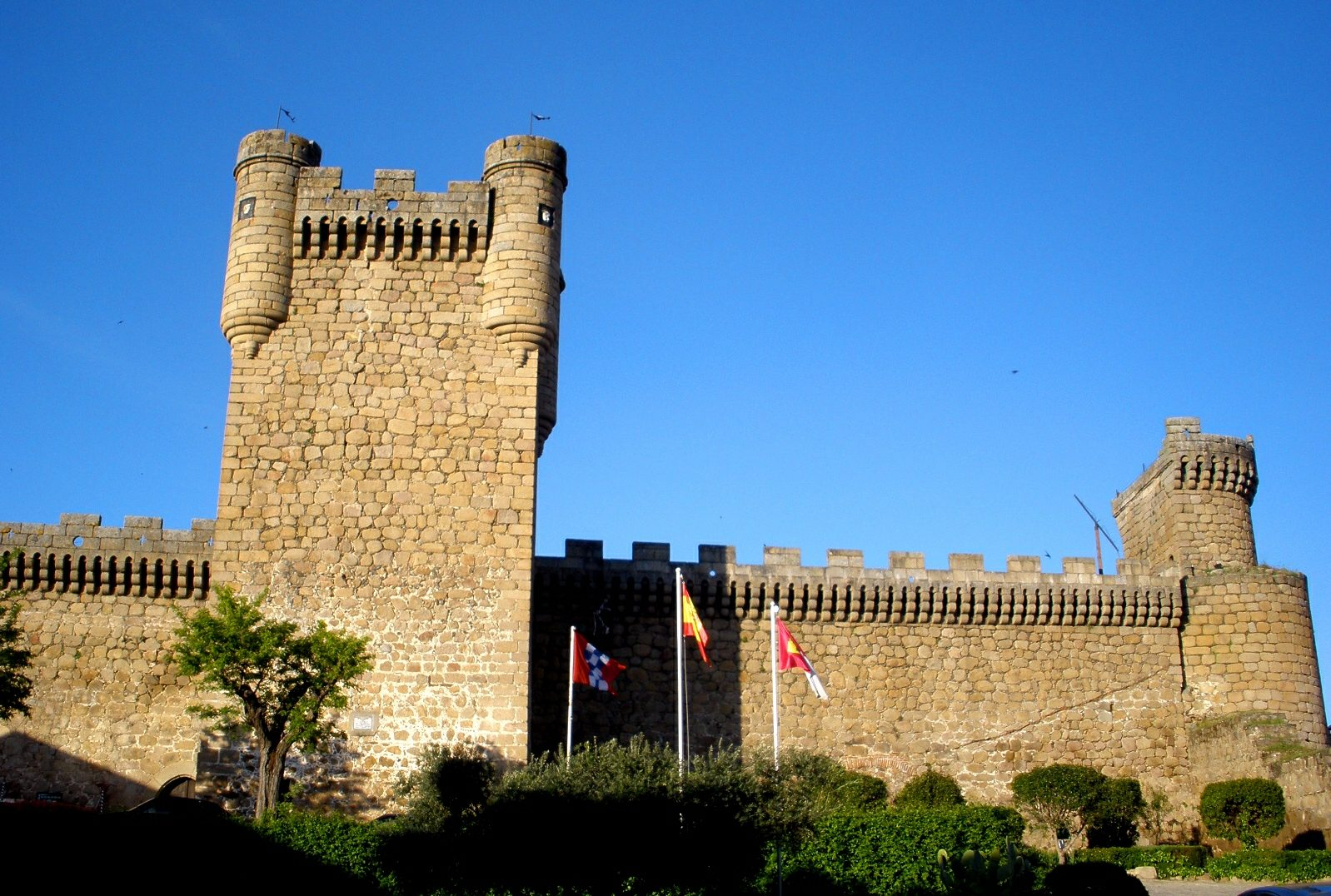
Castle of Oropesa

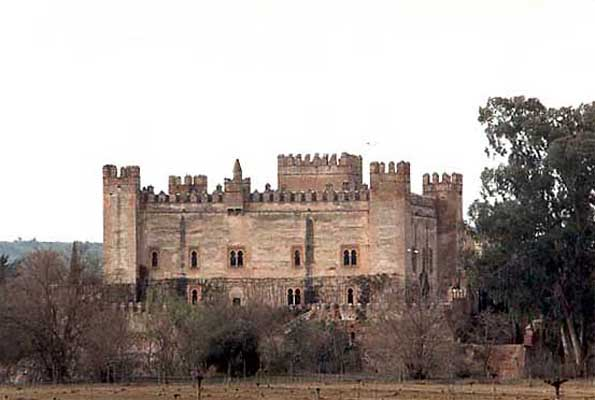
Castle of Malpica de Tajo

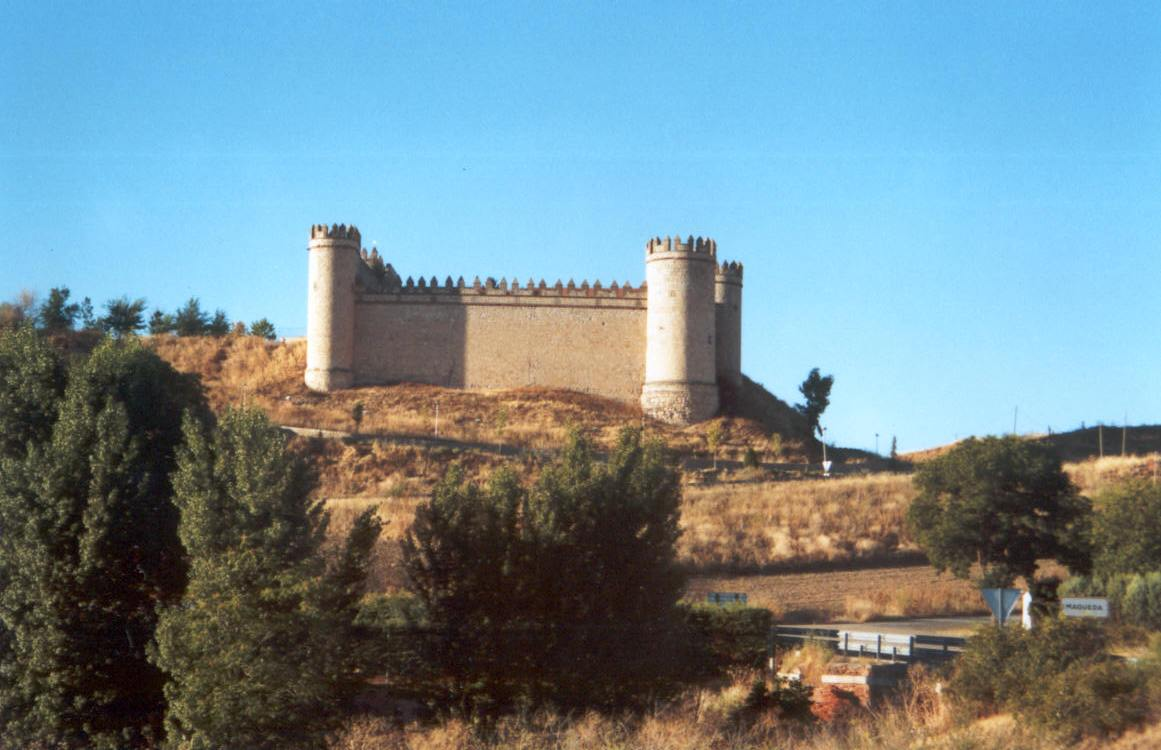
Castle of la Vela

=== Albacete ===
- Castle of Caudete
- Castle of Chinchilla de Montearagón
- Castle of Almansa
- Castle of Sierra
- Castle of Montealegre del Castillo
- Castle of Peñas de San Pedro
- Castle of Munera
- Castle of Alcaraz
- Castle of Alcalá del Júcar
- Castle of La Encomienda
- Castle of Tobarra
- Castle of Yeste
- Castle of Cotillas
- Castle of Ves
- Castle of Llano de la Torre
- Castle of Taibilla
- Castle of Bienservida
- Castle of Rochafrida
- Castle of Vegallera
- Old castle of Carcelén

=== Ciudad Real ===
- Castle of Alarcos
- Castle of Alhambra (Ciudad Real)
- Castle of Calatrava la Vieja
- Castle-Convent of Calatrava la Nueva
- Castle of Caracuel
- Castle of Doña Berenguela
- Castle of la Estrella
- Castle of Miraflores (Piedrabuena)
- Castle of Montizón
- Castle of Pilas Bonas
- Castle of Peñarroya
- Castle of Salvatierra
- Tower of Terrinches or Castle of Terrinches

=== Cuenca ===
- Castle of Cuenca, (Cuenca)
- Castle of Alarcón
- Castle of Belmonte
- Castle of Garcimuñoz
- Castle of Huete, Alcazaba of Wabda or Castle of Luna
- Castle of Puebla de Almenara - (Puebla de Almenara)
- Castle of Haro (Villaescusa de Haro)
- Castle of Moya (Moya)
- Castle of Rochafrida Beteta
- Castle del Cañavate, (El Cañavate)
- Castle of Santiago de la Torre, (San Clemente)
- Castle of Paracuellos, (Paracuellos)
- Castle of Uclés, (Uclés)
- Castle of Montalbo, (Montalbo)
- Castle of La Hinojosa, (La Hinojosa)
- Castle of Rus, (San Clemente)
- Castle of Minglanilla, (Minglanilla)
- Castle of Iniesta, (Iniesta)
- Castle of Zafra de Záncara, (Zafra de Záncara)
- Castle of Huélamo, (Huélamo)
- Castle of Cañete, (Cañete)
- Tower Mangana, (Cuenca)
- Tower of the Moor, (Honrubia)
- Old Tower, (San Clemente)
- Tower of Ranera, (Talayuelas)

=== Guadalajara ===
- Alcázar Real de Guadalajara
- Alcazaba of Zorita, in Zorita de los Canes
- Castle of Albalate de Tajuña, in the municipality of Luzaga
- Castle of Albaráñez, near Salmerón
- Castle of Alcocer
- Castle of Alcorlo, Castle del Corlo or Castle del Congosto, in San Andrés del Congosto
- Castle of Algar de Mesa
- Castle of Alhóndiga
- Castle of Almalaff, near Hortezuela de Océn
- Castle of Almoguera
- Castle of Alpetea, in the municipality of Villar de Cobeta
- Castle of Anguix
- Castle of Aragosa
- Castle of Arbeteta
- Castle of Atienza
- Castle of Baides
- Castle of Bembibre, in Castilmimbre
- Castle of Berninches
- Castle of Canales del Ducado
- Castle of Casasana
- Castle of Castejón de Henares
- Castle of Castilforte
- Castle of Castilnuevo
- Castle of Cobeta
- Castle of Codes
- Castle of the Count Don Julián, in the municipality of Taravilla
- Castle of Cogolludo
- Castle del Cuadrón or Castle of Santa Ana, in Auñón
- Castle of Cuevas Minadas
- Castle of Diempures, in Cantalojas
- Castle of Don Juan Manuel, in Cifuentes
- Castle of Doña Urraca or Castle of Molinán, in Beleña de Sorbe
- Castle of Durón
- Castle of Embid
- Castle of Escamilla
- Castle of Escopete
- Castle of Espinosa de Henares or El Palacio
- Castle of Establés or Castle of the Bad Shadow
- Castle of Fuentelencina and Tower of the Moor Cantana
- Castle of la Fandiña, in the municipality of Taravilla
- Castle of Fuentelsaz
- Castle of Fuentelviejo
- Castle of Fuentes, in Fuentes de la Alcarria
- Castle of los Funes, in Villel de Mesa
- Castle of Galve de Sorbe or Castle of the Zúñiga
- Castle of Guijosa
- Old castle of Guijosa
- Castle of Guisema, in the municipality of Tortuera
- Castle of Hita
- Castle of Hueva
- Castle of Inesque, between Angón and Pálmaces de Jadraque, in the municipality of Atienza
- Castle of Jadraque or Castle of the Cid
- Castle of Labros
- Castle of La Yunta
- Castle of Loranca de Tajuña
- Castle of Mandayona
- Castle of Mayrena, in Horche
- Castle of Mesa, in the municipality of Villel de Mesa
- Castle of Miedes de Atienza
- Castle of Milmarcos
- Castle of Mochales
- Castle of Molina de Aragón or Fortress of Molina de los Caballeros
- Castle of Mondéjar
- Castle of Montarrón
- Castle of the Moor, en Terzaga
- Castle of the Moors (Luzón), near Luzón
- Castle of the Moors (Tierzo), in Tierzo
- Castle of Motos
- Castle of Muduex
- Castle of Murel de Tajo or Castle of Santa María de Murel, between Morillejo and Carrascosa de Tajo
- Castle of Ocentejo
- Castle of Orea
- Castle of Palazuelos
- Castle of Pareja
- Castle of Pelegrina
- Castle of Peña Bermeja, in Brihuega
- Castle of Peñahora, near Humanes
- Castle of Peñalén
- Castle of Peñalver
- Castle of las Peñas Alkalathem or Castle of las Peñas Alcalatenas, between Trillo and Viana de Mondéjar, on one of the Tetas de Viana
- Pesebrico del Cid, Castle of Álvaro Yáñez or Castle of Barafáñez, near Romanones
- Castle of Pioz
- Castle of Rocha Frida, in the municipality of Atanzón
- Castle of Rueda de la Sierra
- Castle of Saceda, near Peralejos de las Truchas
- Castle of Salmerón
- Castle of Santiuste, near Corduente
- Castle of Sigüenza
- Castle of Riba de Santiuste
- Castle of Tamajón
- Castle of Tendilla
- Castle of Trillo
- Castle of Torija
- Castle of Torresaviñán, Castle of San Juan (La Torresaviñán) or Castle of la Luna, in La Torresaviñán
- Castle of Trijueque
- Castle of Uceda
- Castle of Valfermoso de Tajuña
- Castle of Valtablado del Río
- Castle of Vállaga, in the municipality of Illana
- Castle of Viana de Mondéjar
- Castle of Yunquera de Henares
- Castle of Zafra (Guadalajara), near Campillo de Dueñas
- Fortress of Alcolea de Torote, between Torrejón del Rey and Galápagos
- Fortress of Las Inviernas
- Fortress of Otilla
- Fortress of Torrecuadrada de los Valles
- Fortress of Torrecuadrada de Molina
- Fort fusilier of San Francisco, in Guadalajara
- Atalaya of los Casares, in the municipality of Riba de Saelices
- Atalaya of San Marcos (Centenera de Suso), in the municipality of Atanzón
- Tower of Séñigo, near Sigüenza
- Tower of Aragón, in Molina de Aragón
- Tower of Chilluentes, in the municipality of Tartanedo
- Tower of Doña Blanca (Taravilla), in the municipality of Taravilla
- Tower of la Almofala
- Fort-House of La Bujeda, between Traíd and Otilla
- Fort-House of Setiles
- Fort-House of la Vega de Arias, near Tierzo
- Casilla de los Moros, in Membrillera

=== Toledo ===
- Alcázar of Toledo
- Castle of Alamín
- Castle of Consuegra
- Castle of Villalba
- Castle of San Servando
- Castle of Montalbán
- Castle of Olmos
- Castle of Guadamur
- Castle of Oropesa
- Castle of Malpica de Tajo
- Castle of Mascaraque
- Castle of la Vela
- Castle of Almonacid
- Castle of Peñas Negras
- Castle of Cuerva
- Castle of Barcience
- Castle of Malamoneda
- Castle of Orgaz
- Castle of Dos Hermanas
- Castle of Oreja
- Castle of Guadalerzas
- Castle of Peñaflor
- Castle of San Silvestre
- Castle of Casarrubios del Monte
- Castle of San Vicente
- Castle of Monreal
- Castle of Gálvez
- Castle-palace of Escalona
- Walls and towers albarranas (Talavera de la Reina)

== Catalonia ==
=== Barcelona ===
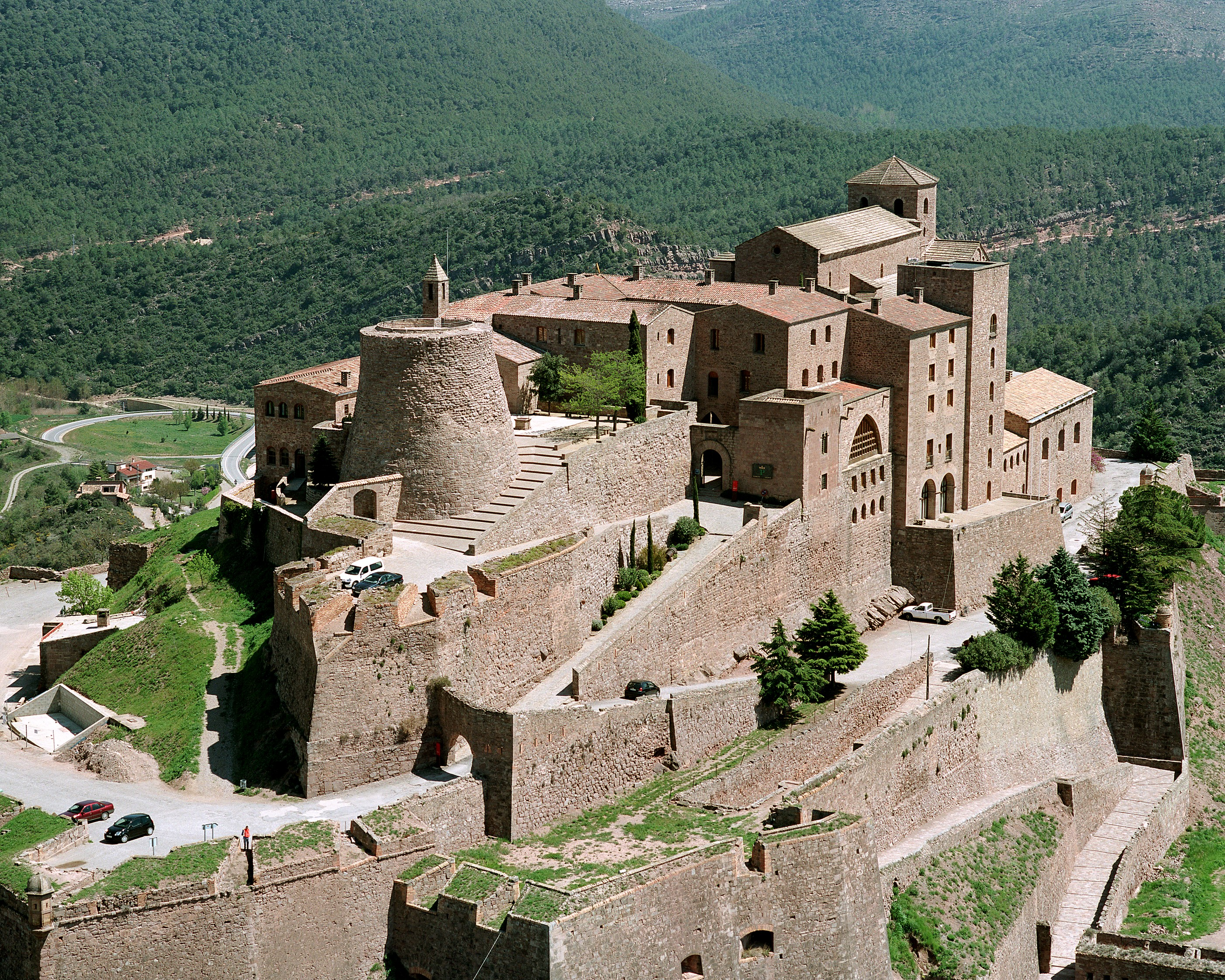
Castle of Cardona

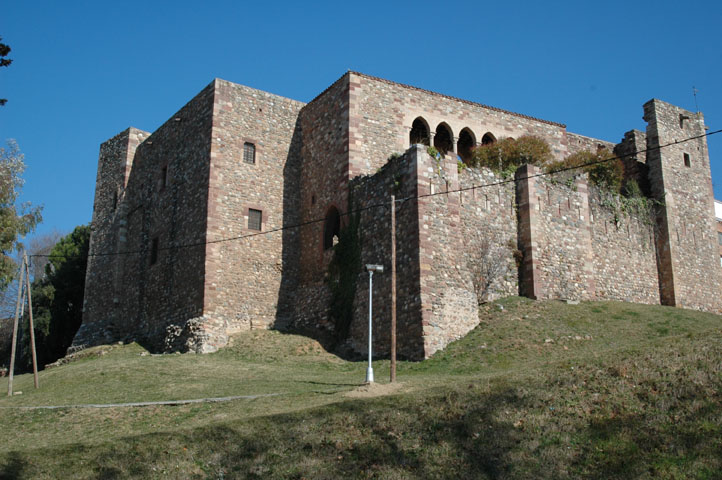
Castle charterhouse of Vallparadís

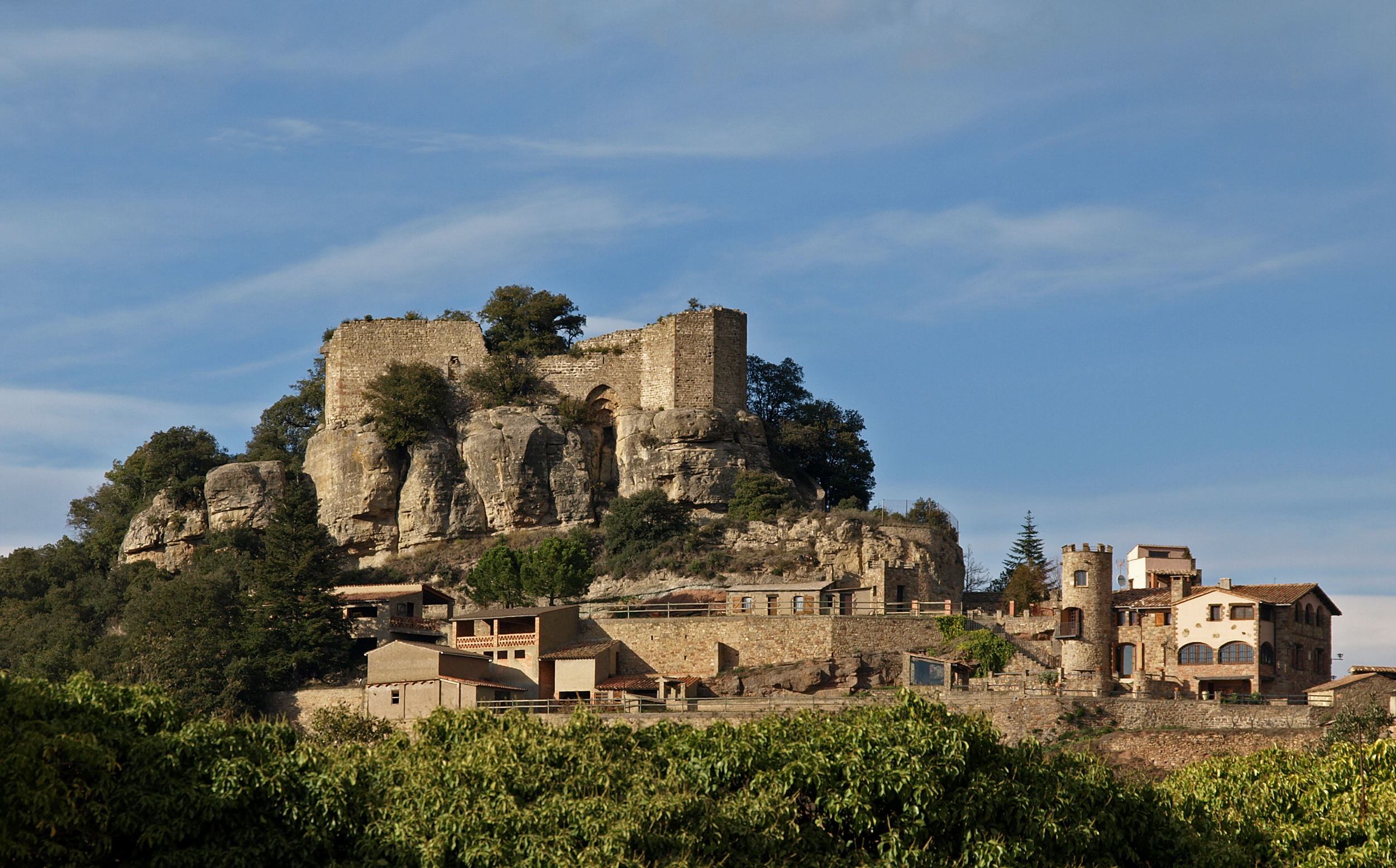
Castle of Granera

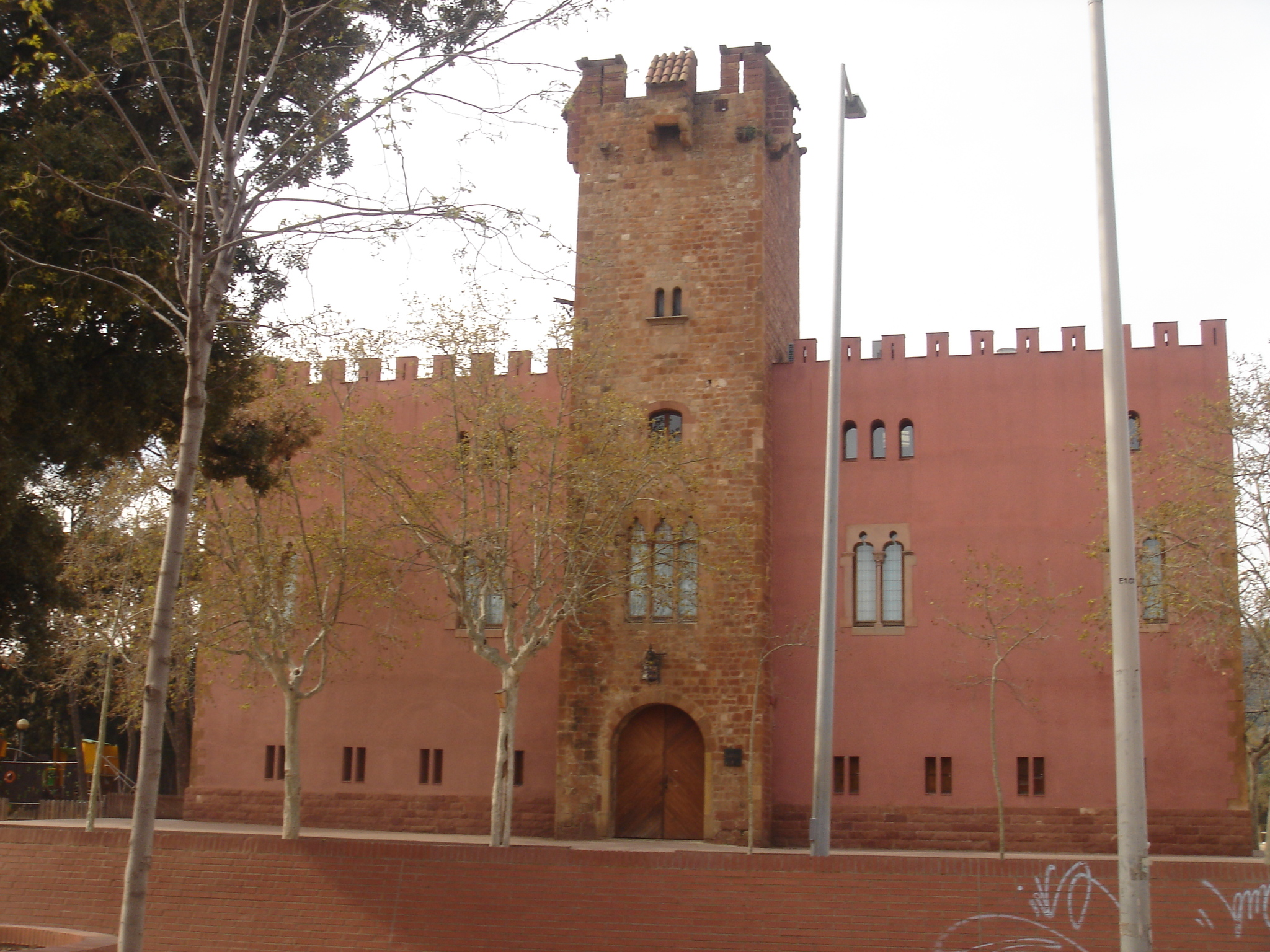
Tower Vermella

- Castle of Burriac
- Castle of Cardona
- Castle of Castelldefels
- Castle of Castellet
- Castle of Claramunt
- Castle of Dosrius
- Castle of Montjuic
- Castle of Orís
- Castle of Santa Florentina
- Castle of Tagamanent
- Castle charterhouse of Vallparadís
- Castle of Castellbell
- Castellciuró
- Castle of Centelles
- Castle of Cervelló
- Castle of Cornellà
- Castle d'Eramprunyà
- Castle of Castellví
- Castle of Gallifa
- Castle of la Roca del Vallès
- Castle of Mogoda
- Castle of Palafolls
- Castle of Pallejà
- Castle of Plegamans
- Castle of la Pobla de Lillet
- Castle of Castellcir
- Castle of Rajadell
- Castle of Rubí
- Castle of Taradell
- Castle of Bell-lloc
- Castle of Montesquiu
- Castle of Montpalau
- Castle of Montbui (Bigues)
- Castle of Vilassar
- Castle of Granera
- Castle of Penya del Moro
- Tower Vermella
- Castle of the Camp de la Bota

=== Tarragona ===
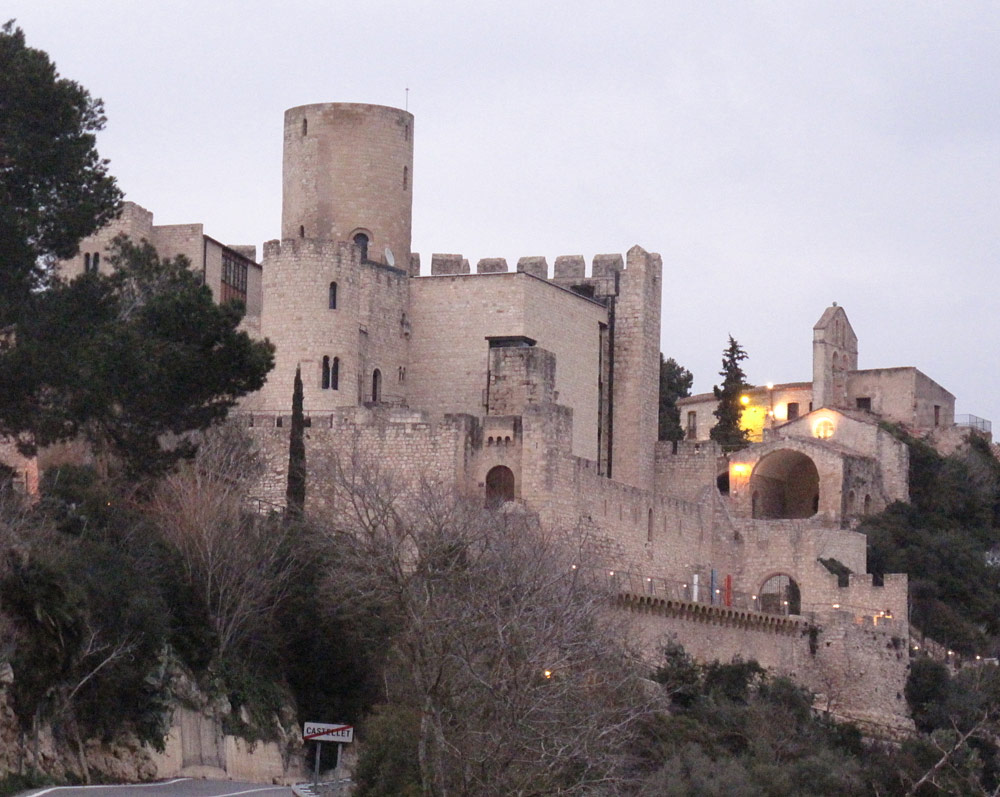
Castle of Castellet

- Castle of Miravet
- Castle of the Count Sicart
- Castle of Tamarit
- Castle of Montclar (Pontils)
- Castle of Torredembarra
- Castle of Castellet
- Castle of Rocamora
- Monastery of Sant Miquel d'Escornalbou
- Torre Vella de Salou
- Tower d'en Dolça
- Walls of Montblanc
- Walls of Tarragona

=== Girona ===
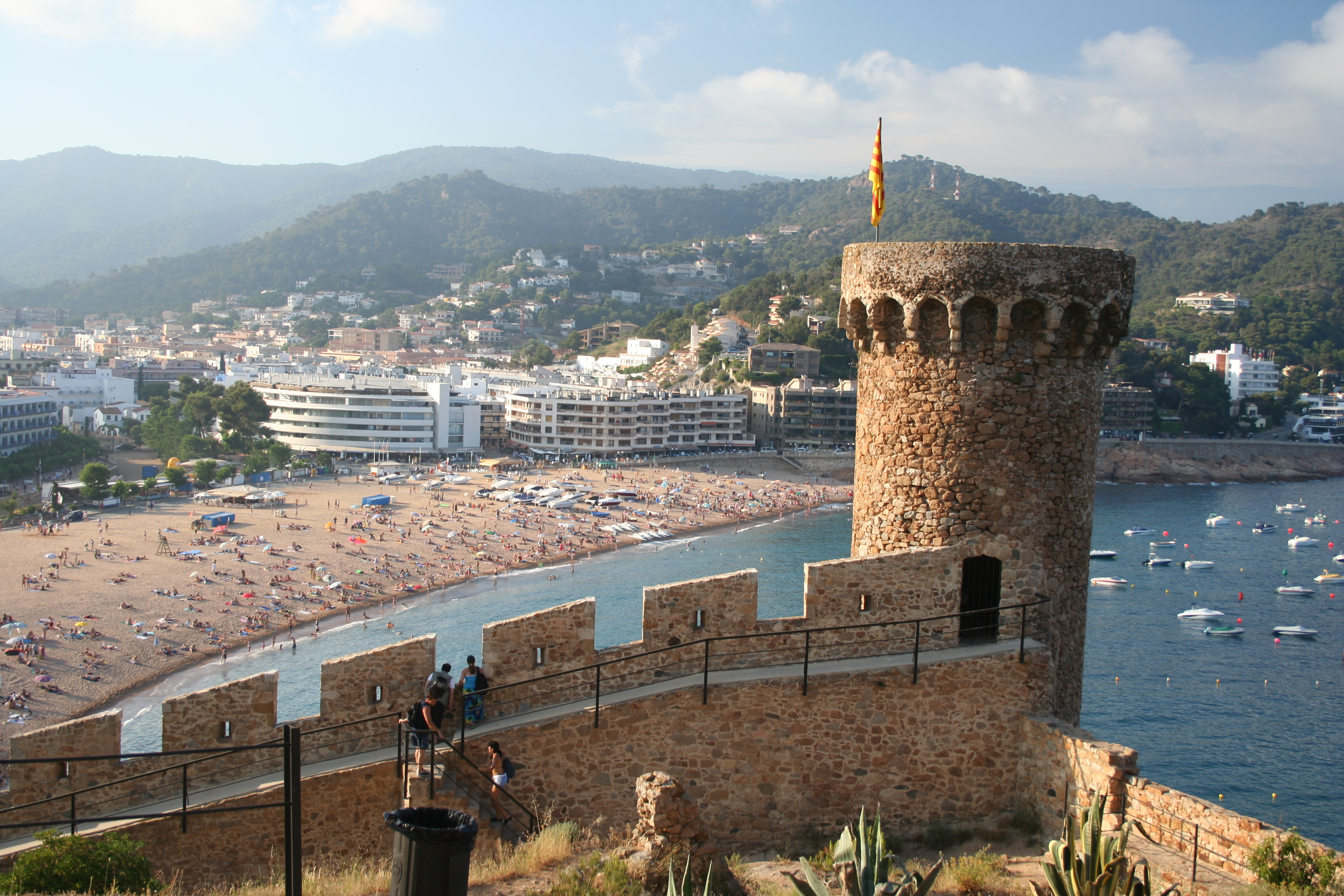
Vila Vella enceinte

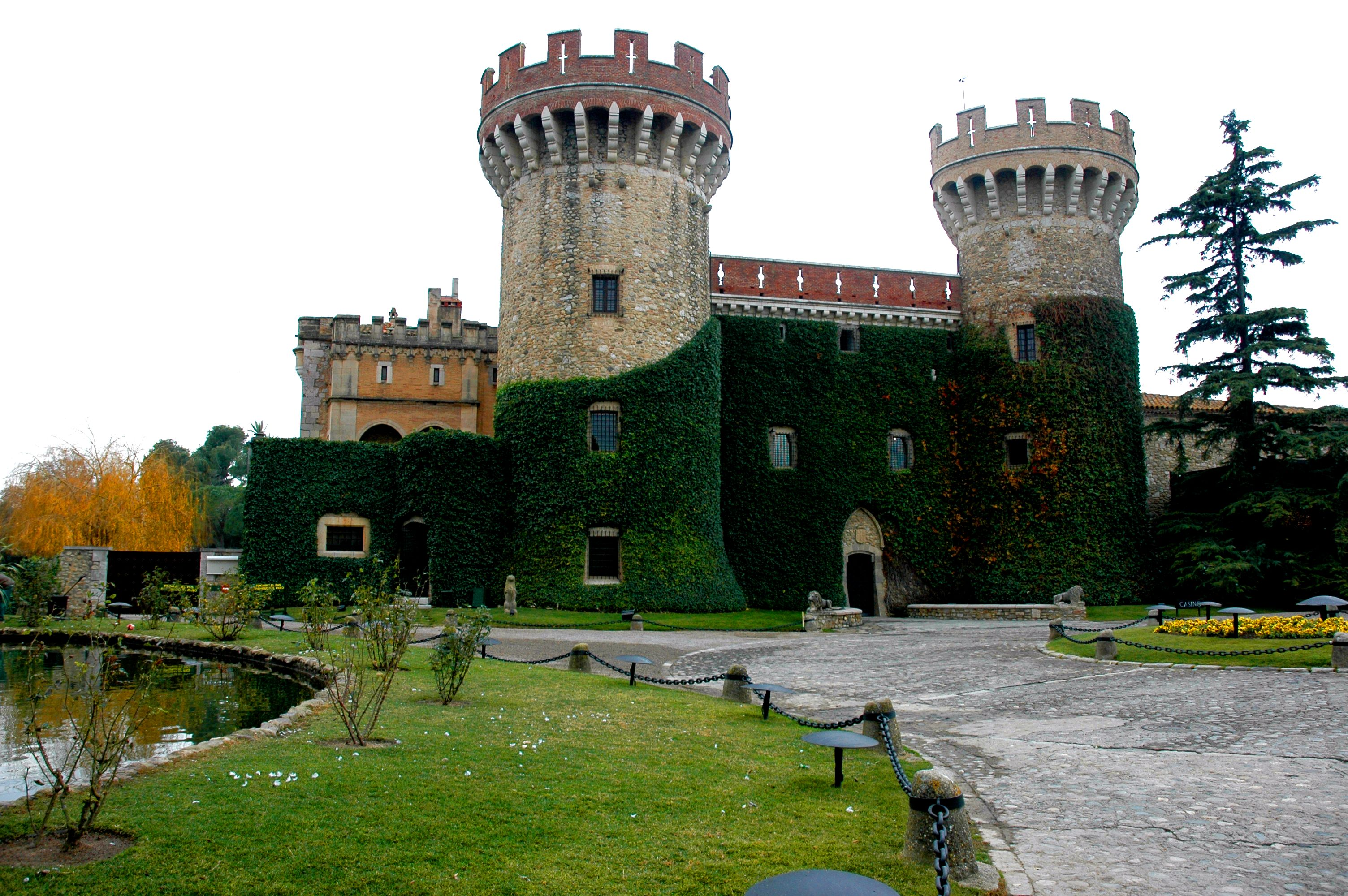
Castle of Peralada

- Vila Vella enceinte of Tossa de Mar
- Castle of Montsoriu
- Castle of Peralada
- Castle of la Tallada (Baix Empordà)
- Castle of Sant Joan de Blanes
- Castle of Requesens
- Castle of Palau-sator
- Castle of Palau Sacosta
- Castle of Bufalaranya
- Castell de Cabrera (Alt Empordà)
- Castle d'Espolla
- Castle of Llagostera
- Castle of Montagut
- Castle of Púbol
- Castle of Quermançó
- Castle of Rocabertí
- Castle of Rupià
- Castle of Sant Ferran
- Castle of Verdera
- Castle of Vulpellac
- Castle d'Albons
- Castle of Llívia
- Castle of the Montgrí
- Castle of Farners
- Castle of Verges
- Castle-palace of la Bisbal
- Castle of Falgons https://castelldefalgons.com/

=== Lleida ===
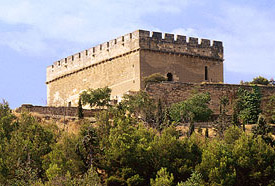
Castle of Gardeny

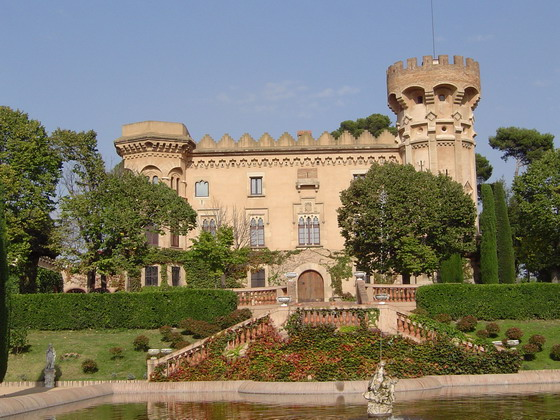
Castle of Sant Marçal

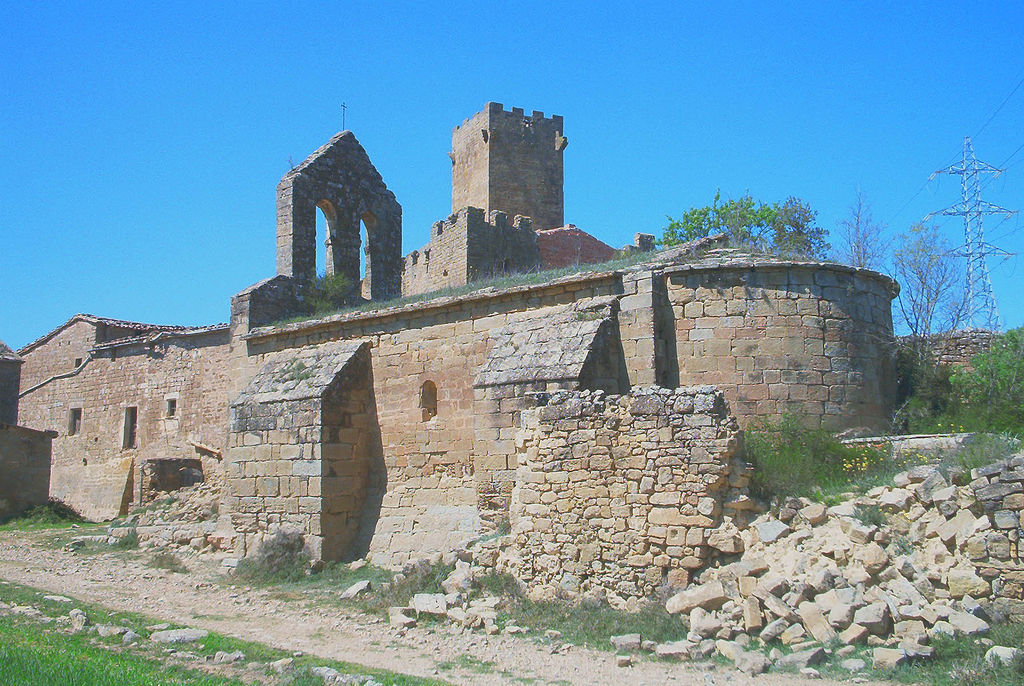
Castle of les Sitges

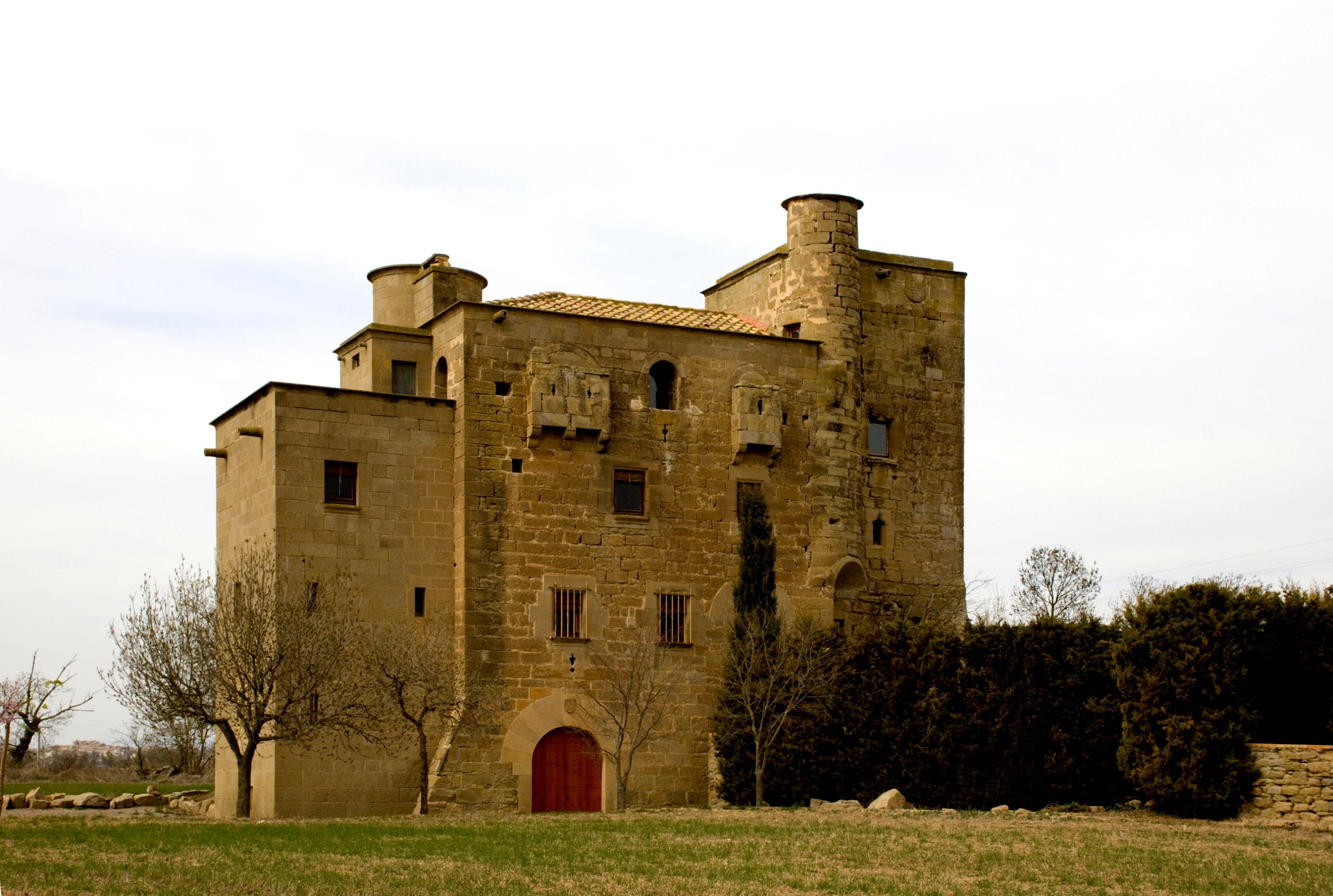
Castle of Ratera

- Castle and village of Talarn
- Alcazaba of Lleida (Suda de Lleida)
- Castle of Maldà
- Castle of Besora
- Castle of Gardeny
- Castle of Montsonis
- Castle of la Tallada (Segarra)
- Castle d'Albatàrrec
- Castle of Basturs
- Castle of Benavent de la Conca
- Castle of Biscarri
- Castle of Castellnou d'Ossó
- Castle of Castelló de Farfanya
- Castle d'Abella de la Conca
- Castle d'Escarlà
- Castell d'Espills
- Castle of Llordá
- Castle of Sant Miquel de la Vall
- Castle of Sarroca de Bellera
- Castle of Serradell
- Castle of Toralla
- Castle of Ciutadilla
- Castle of Concabella
- Castle d'Enfesta
- Castle of Gurp
- Castle of Llimiana
- Castle of Madrona
- Castle of Sant Marçal
- Castle of Mur
- Castle de la Pedra
- Castle of Sallent (Pinell de Solsonès)
- Castle of Sanaüja
- Castle of Sapeira
- Castle of les Sitges
- Castle of Toló
- Castle of Pallars
- Castle of Verdú
- Castle d'Eroles
- Castle of Miralles
- Castle d'Orrit
- Castle of Ratera
- Castle of Ciutat
- Castle of Puigcercós
- Castle of the Remei
- Castle of Santa Engràcia
- Castle of Vilamitjana
- Castle of Viuet
- Atalaya of the Castle of Guimerà

== Extremadura ==
=== Cáceres ===
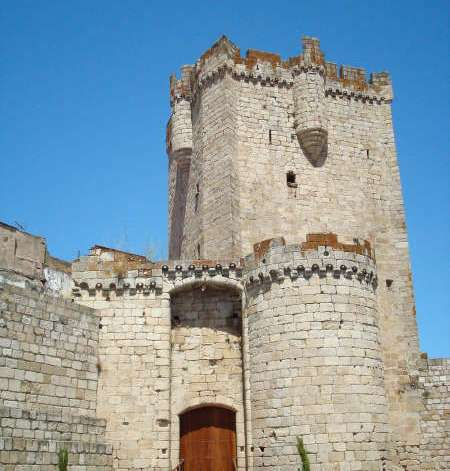
Castle of Coria.

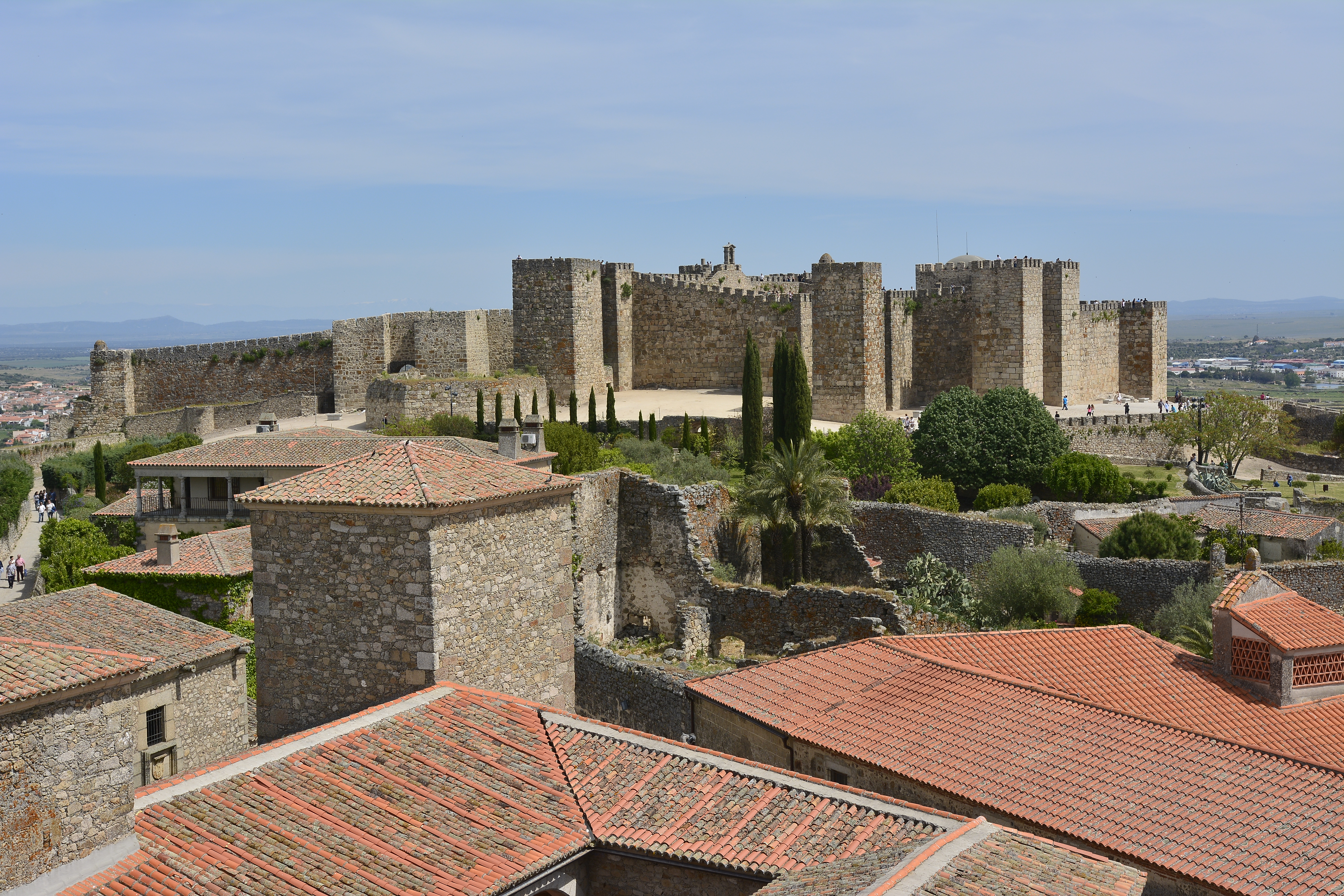
Castle of Trujillo

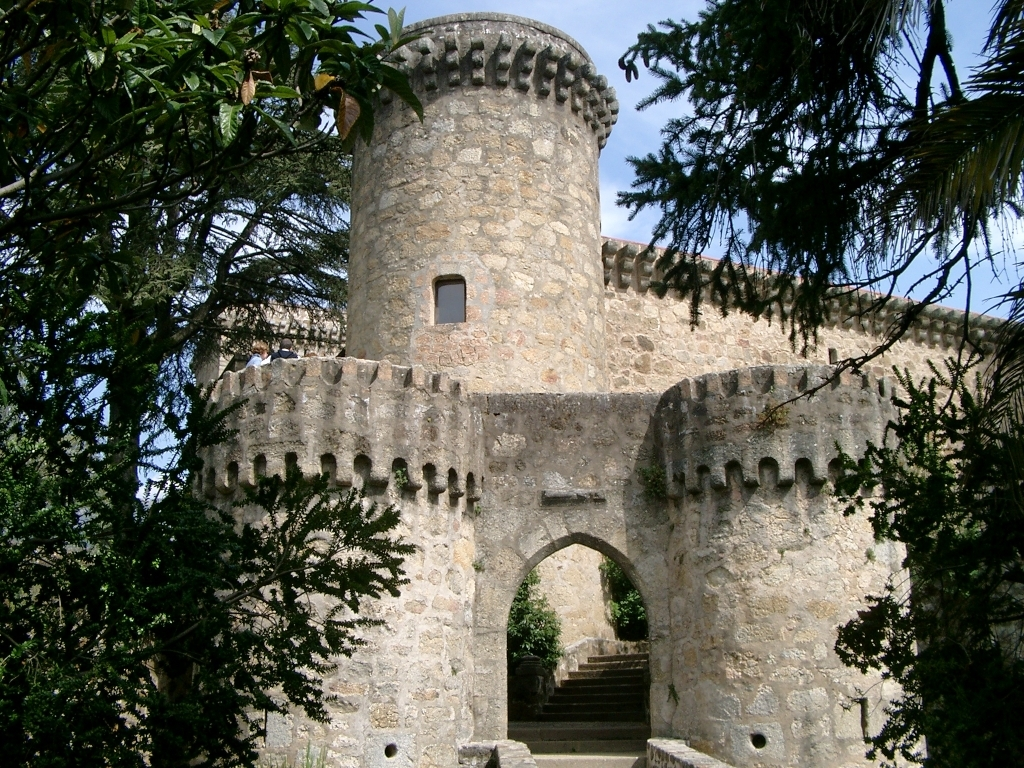
Castle Palace of the Counts of Oropesa

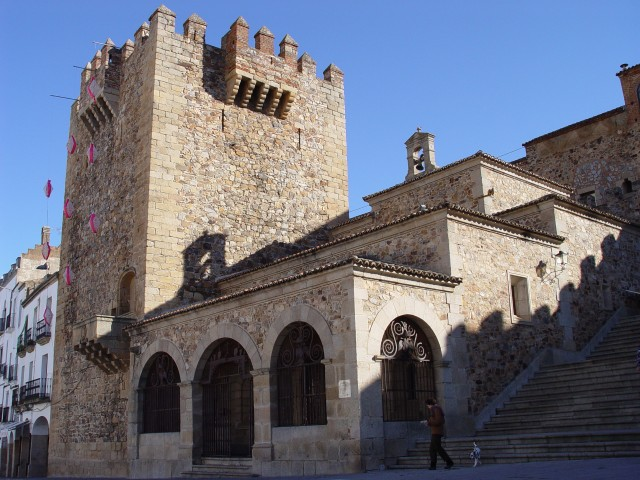
Tower of Bujaco

- Alcázar of Alcántara
- Alcázar of Galisteo
- Alcázar of Plasencia
- Castle of Floripes
- Castle of Almaraz
- Castle of las Arguijuelas de Abajo
- Castle of las Arguijuelas de Arriba
- Castle of Arroyo de la Luz
- Castle of Belvís de Monroy
- Castle of Bernardo
- Castle of Brozas
- Castle of Cabañas del Castillo
- Castle of Cañamero
- Castle of Coria
- Castle of Eljas
- Castle of Granadilla
- Castle of Grimaldo
- Castle of Mayoralgo
- Castle of los Mogollones
- Castle of Mohedanos
- Castle of Monfragüe
- Castle of Monroy
- Castle of Montánchez
- Castle of la Peña del Acero
- Castle of Peñafiel (Zarza la Mayor)
- Castle of los Pizarro (Segura de la Sierra)
- Castle of Portezuelo
- Castle of Salor
- Castle of Salvaleón
- Castle of Santibáñez el Alto
- Castle of las Seguras
- Castle of Torremenga
- Castle of Trevejo
- Castle of Trujillo
- Castle of Valverde de la Vera
- Castle of Viandar de la Vera
- Castle Palace of the Counts of Oropesa or Castle of Jarandilla
- Palace of Sotofermoso
- Fortress of Aldea del Cano
- Tower of Bujaco
- Almenara of Gata
- Walls of Plasencia

=== Badajoz ===
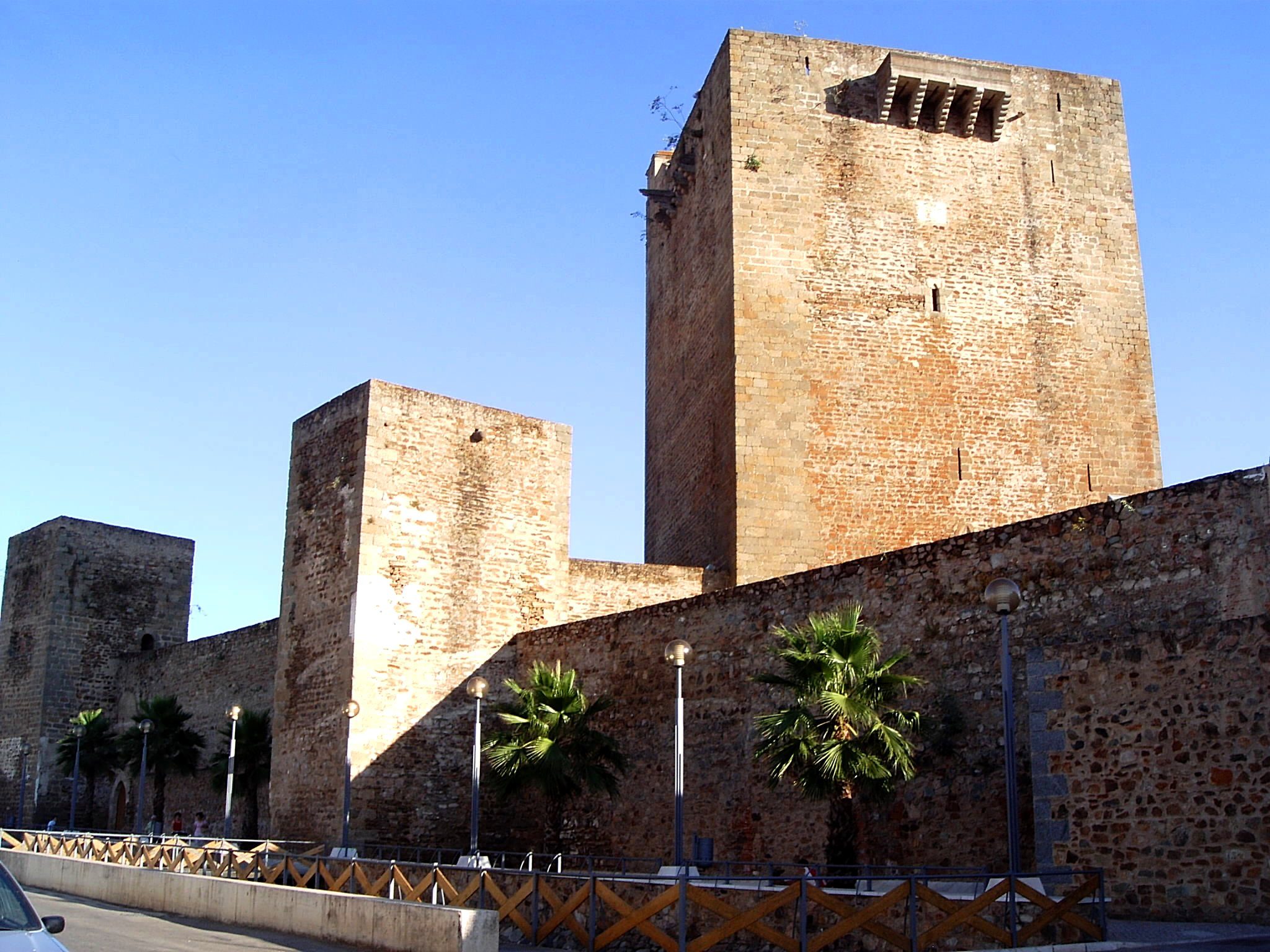
Castle of Olivença

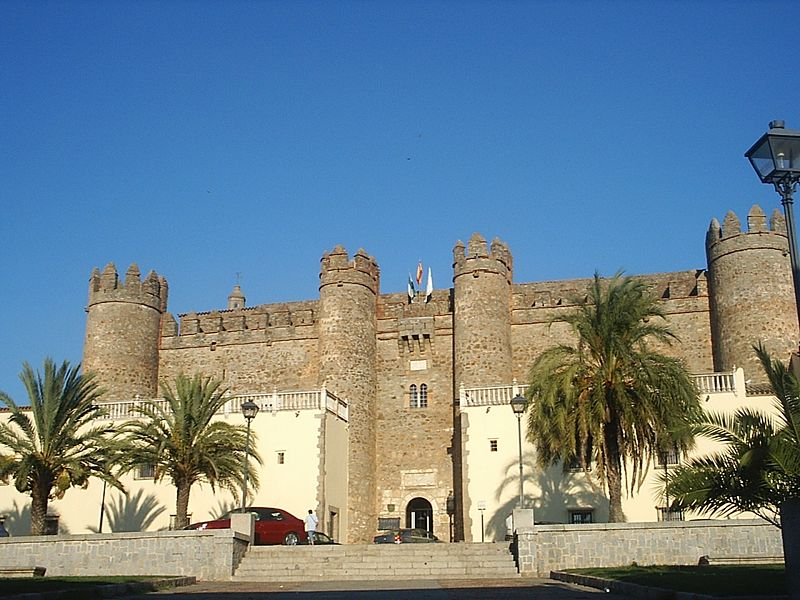
Castle of Zafra (Badajoz)

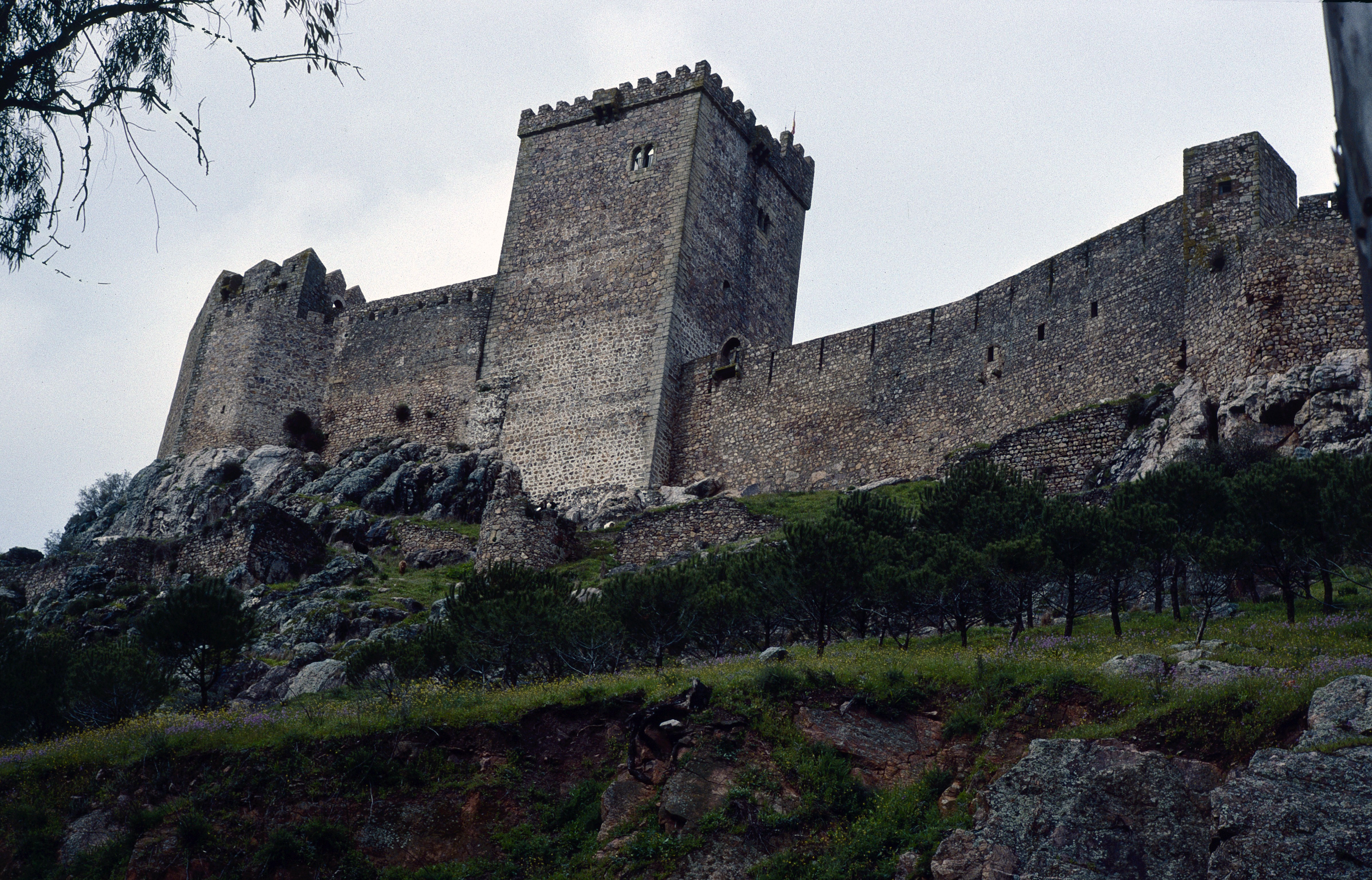
Castle of Alburquerque (Badajoz)

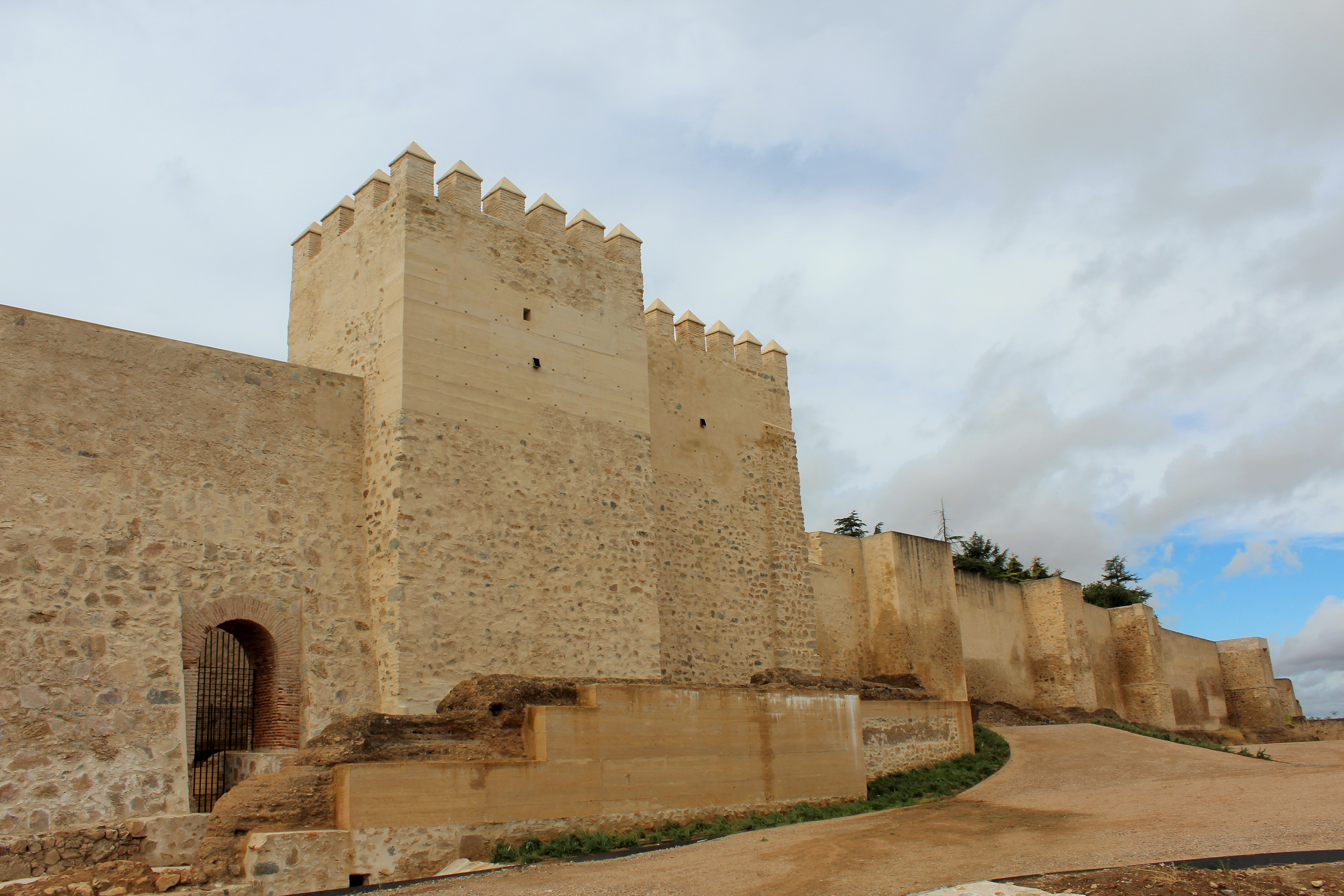
Alcazaba of Badajoz (Badajoz)

- Alcazaba of Badajoz
- Alcazaba of Mérida
- Alcazaba of Reina
- Castle of Alange
- Castle of Alburquerque
- Castle of Alconchel
- Castle of Fregenal de la Sierra
- Castle of Almorchón
- Castle of Azuaga
- Castle of Benquerencia de la Serena
- Castle of Burguillos del Cerro
- Castle of Capilla
- Castle of La Codosera
- Castle of la Encomienda
- Castle of Feria
- Castle of Fuente del Maestre
- Templar Castle of Fregenal de la Sierra
- Castle of Herrera del Duque
- Castle of Higuera de Vargas
- Castle of Hornachos
- Castle of Jerez de los Caballeros
- Castle of Luna
- Castle of Magacela
- Castle of Mayorga
- Castle of Medellín
- Castle of Montemolín
- Castle of Olivença
- Castle of Puebla de Alcocer
- Castle of Nogales
- Castle of Piedrabuenap
- Castle of Salvaleón
- Castle of Salvatierra de los Barros
- Castle of Segura de León
- Castle of the Towers
- Castle of Villagarcía de la Torre
- Castle of la Vaguada
- Castle of Zafra (Badajoz)
- Castle of Zalamea de la Serena

== Galicia ==
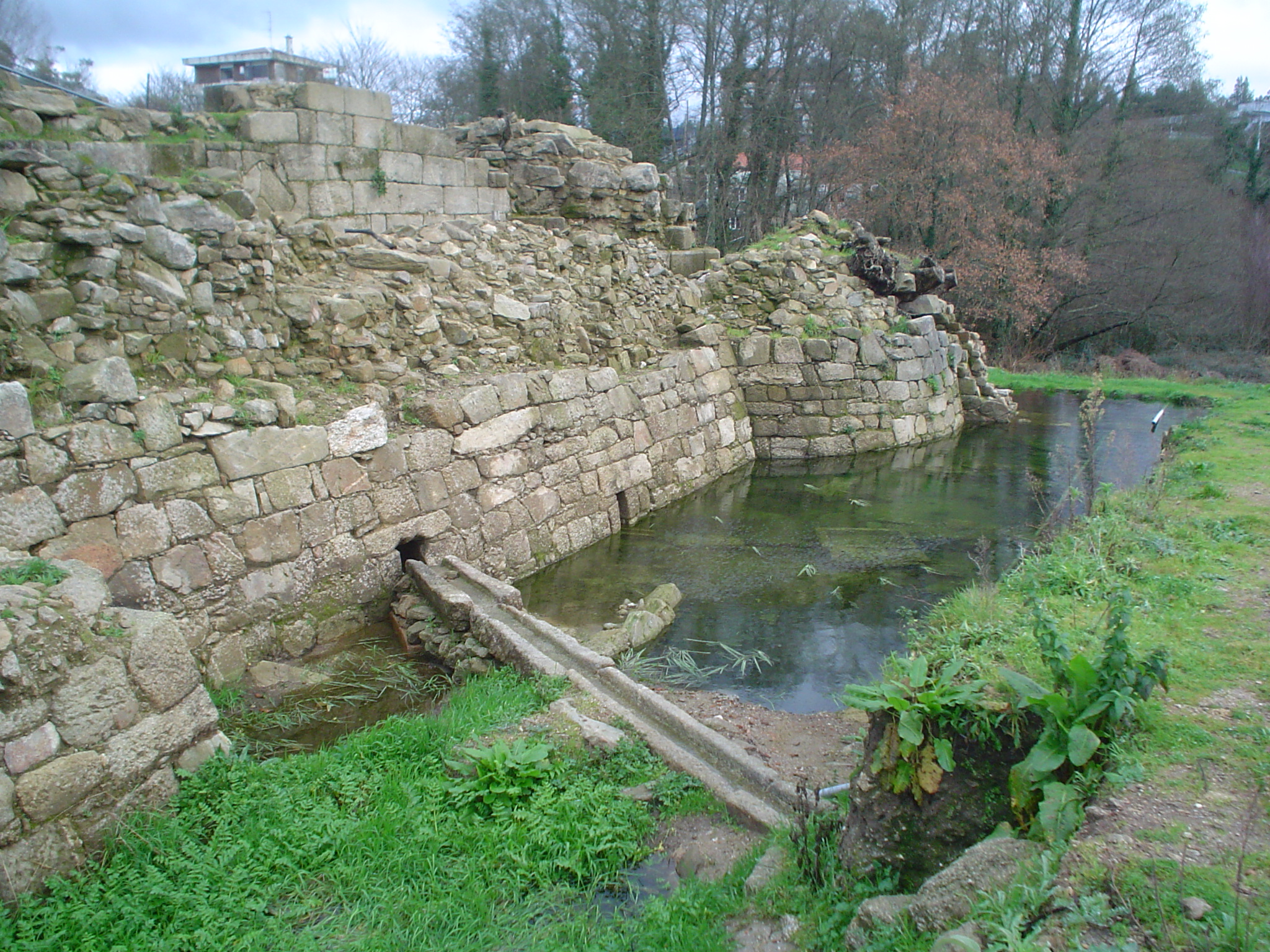
Castle da Rocha Forte

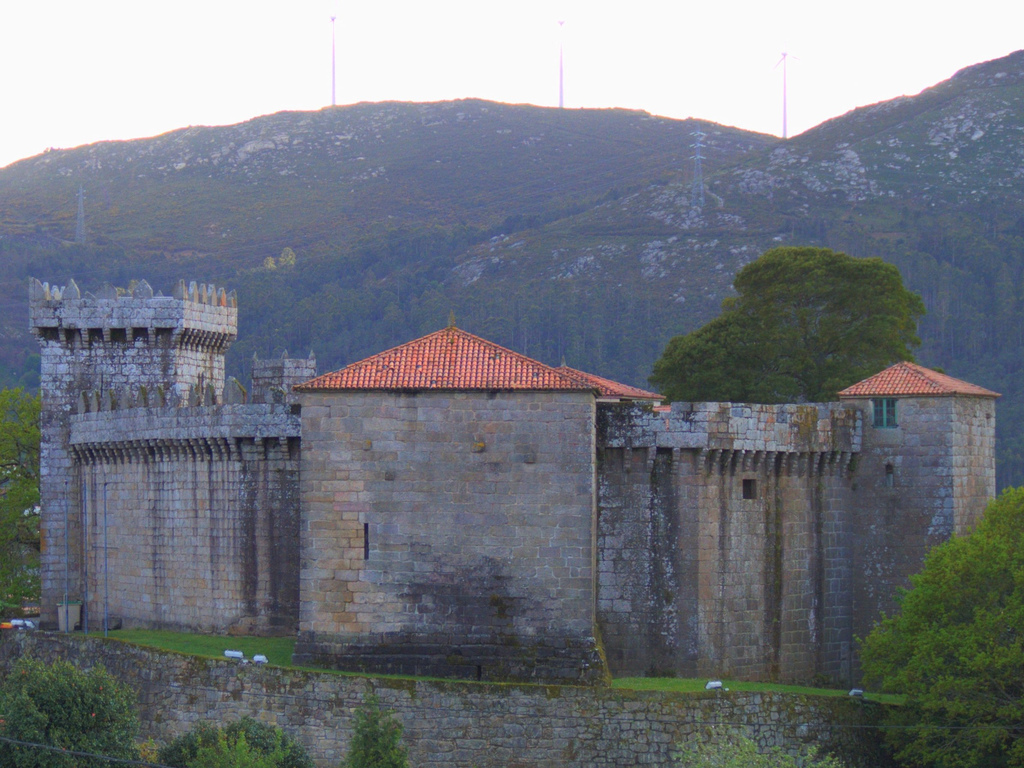
Castle of Vimianzo

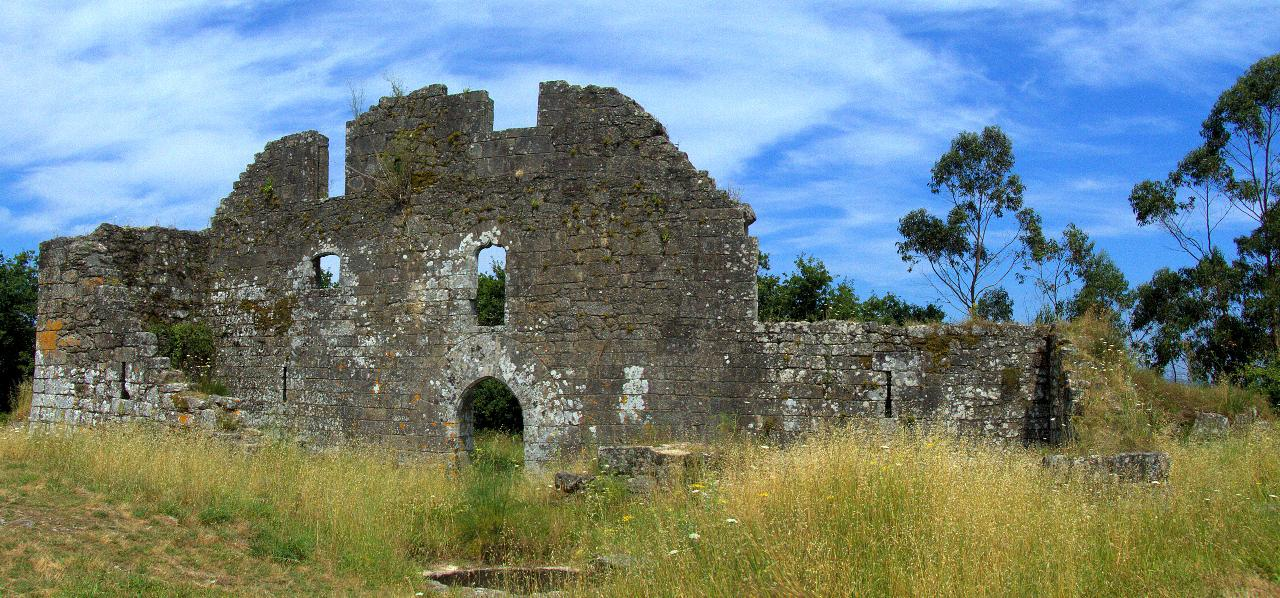
Towers of Altamira

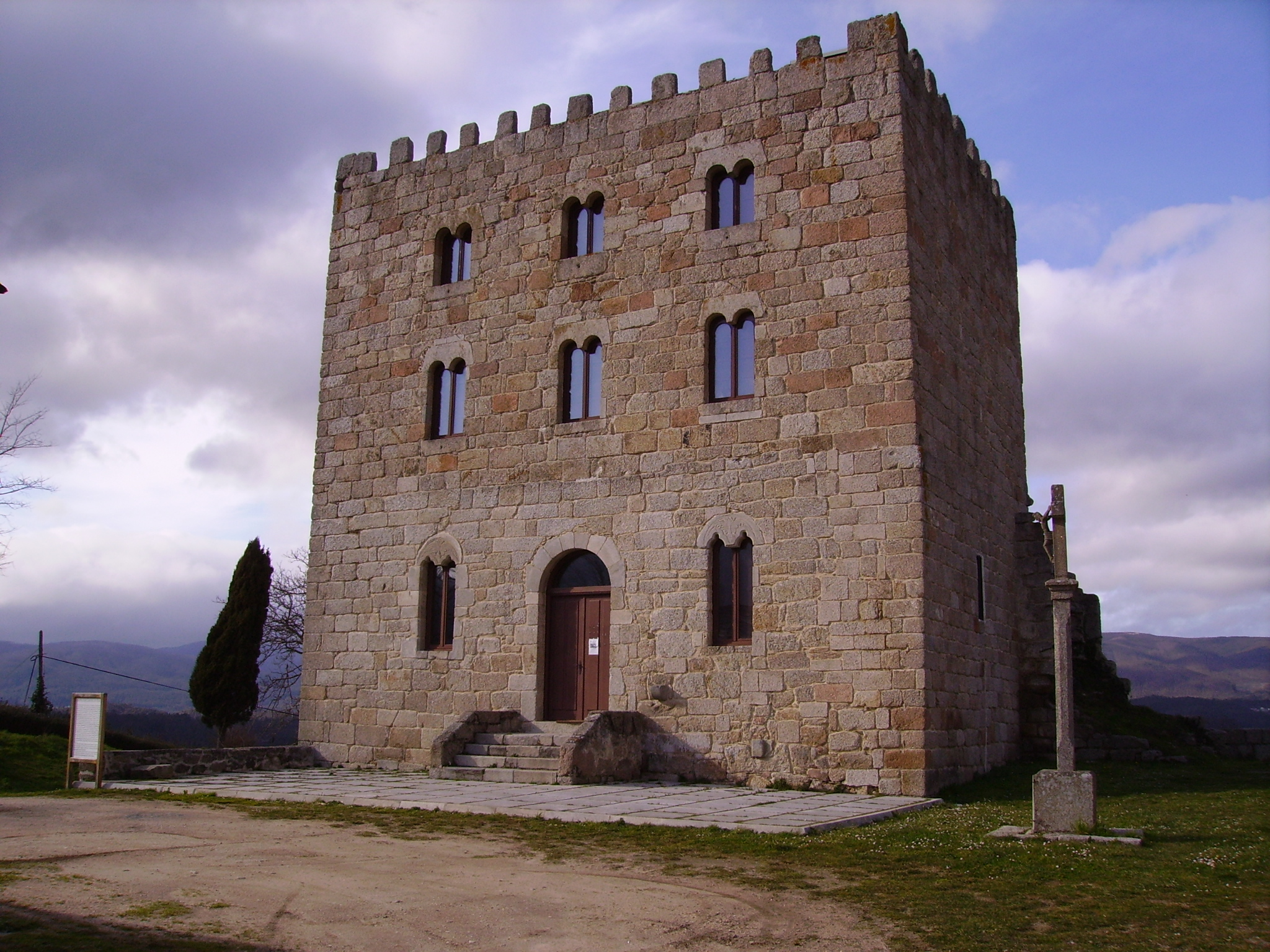
Castle do Castrodouro, keep.

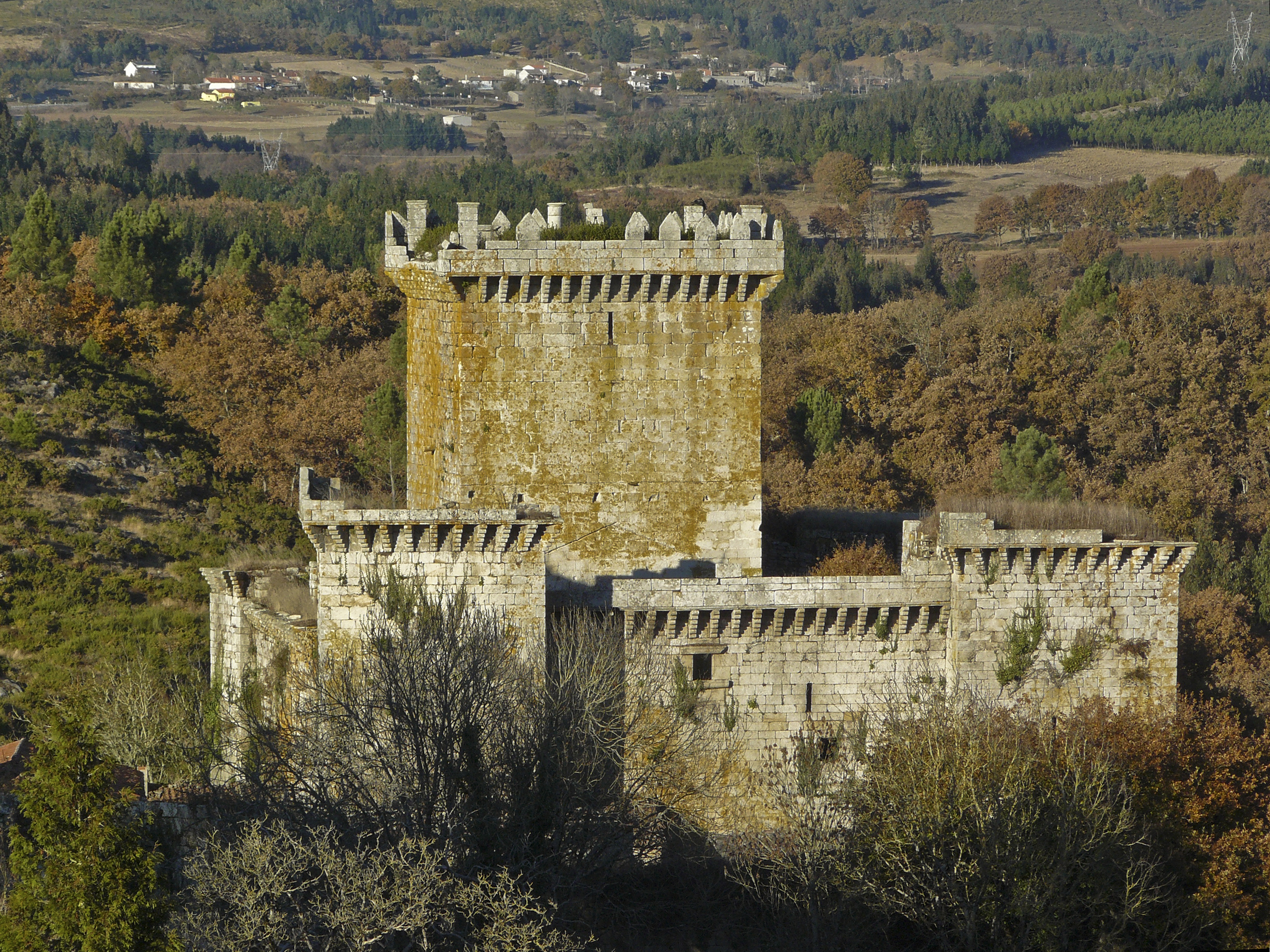
Castle of Pambre

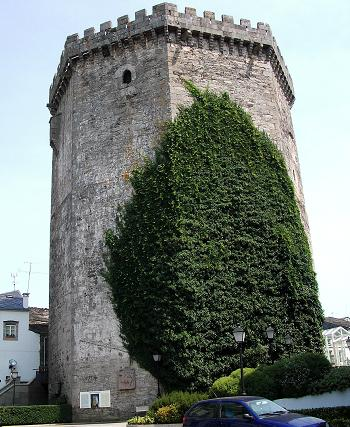
Tower of the Castle dos Andrade

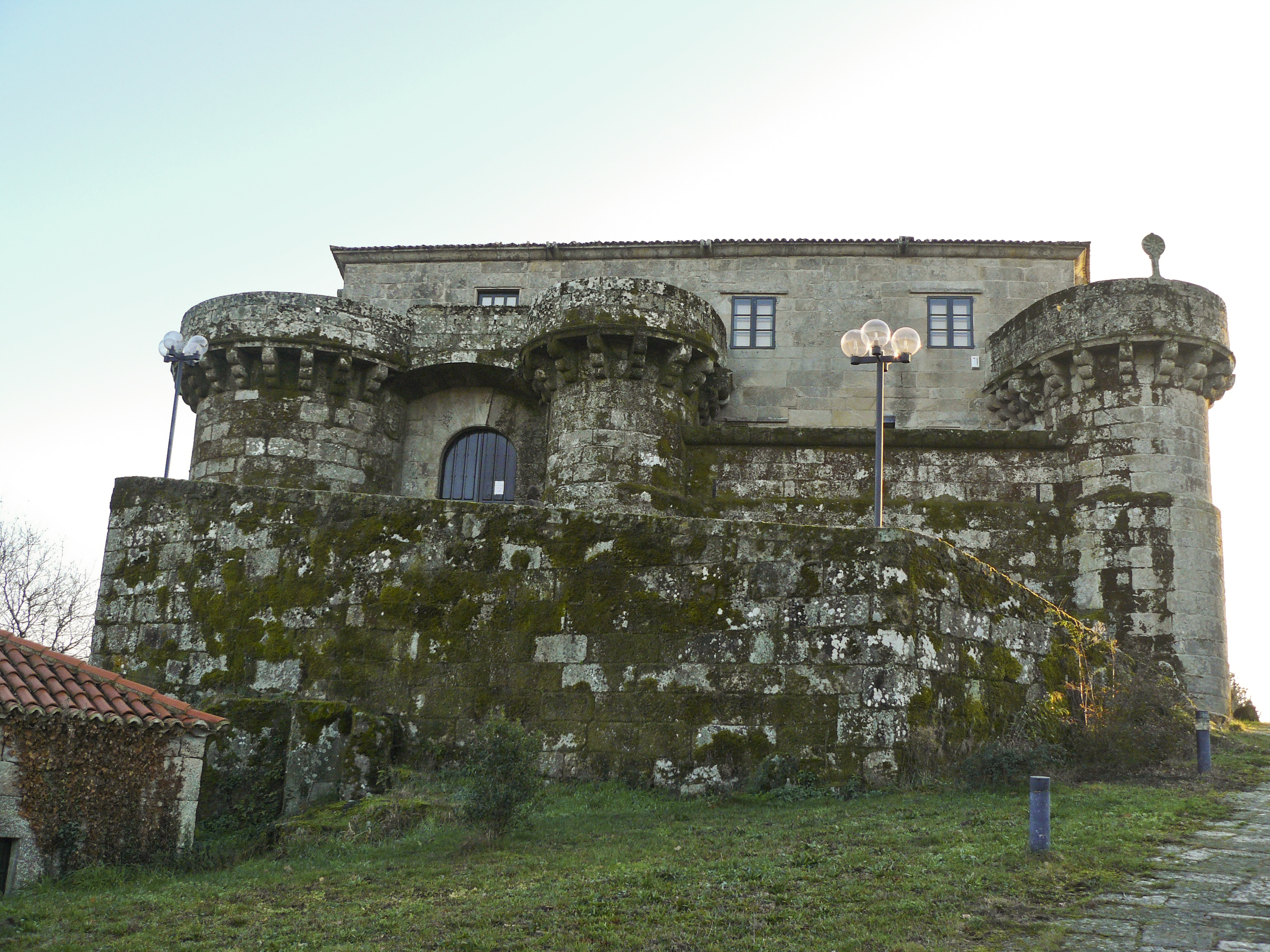
Castle of Vilamarín

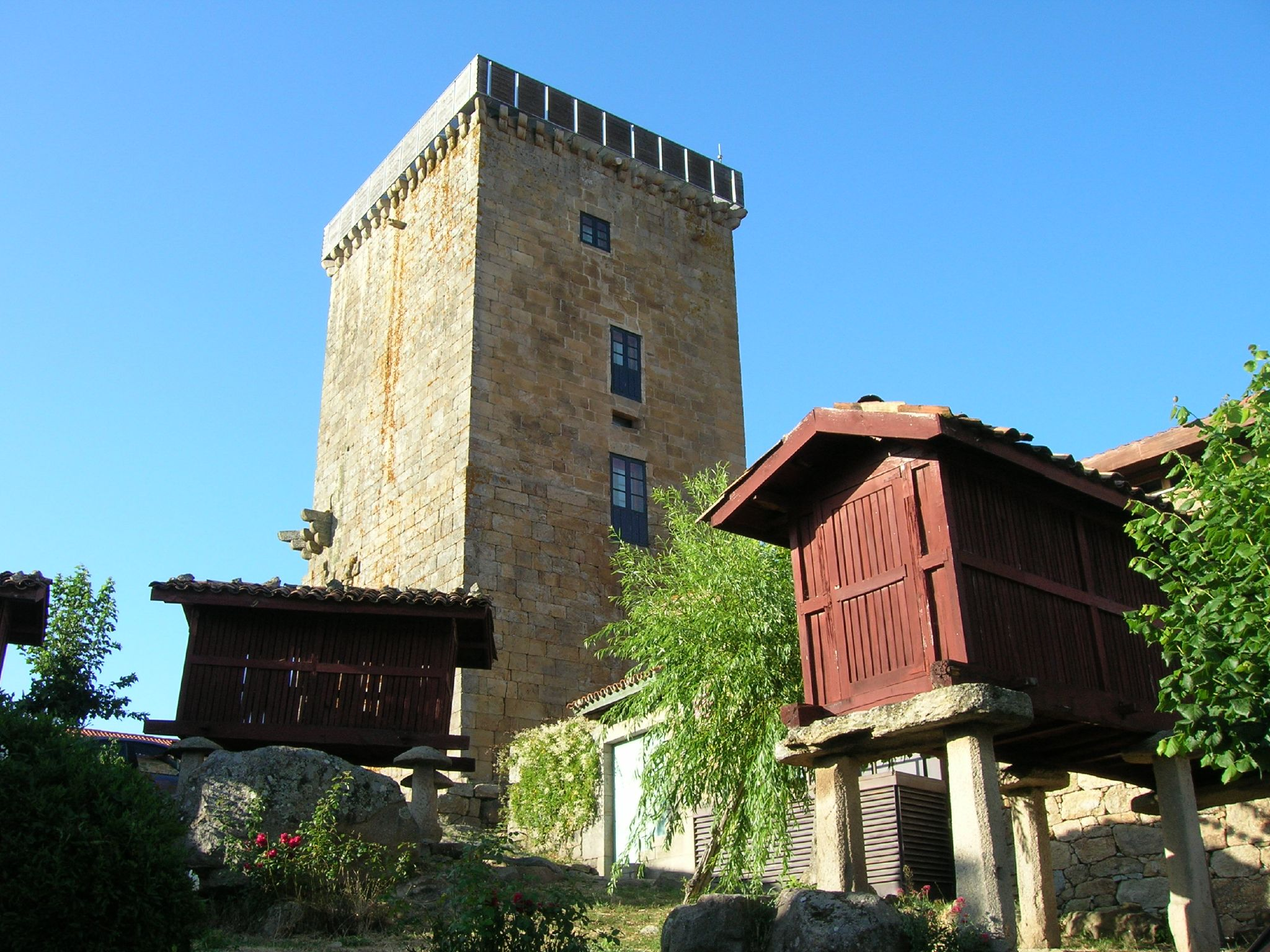
Tower of Vilanova dos Infantes

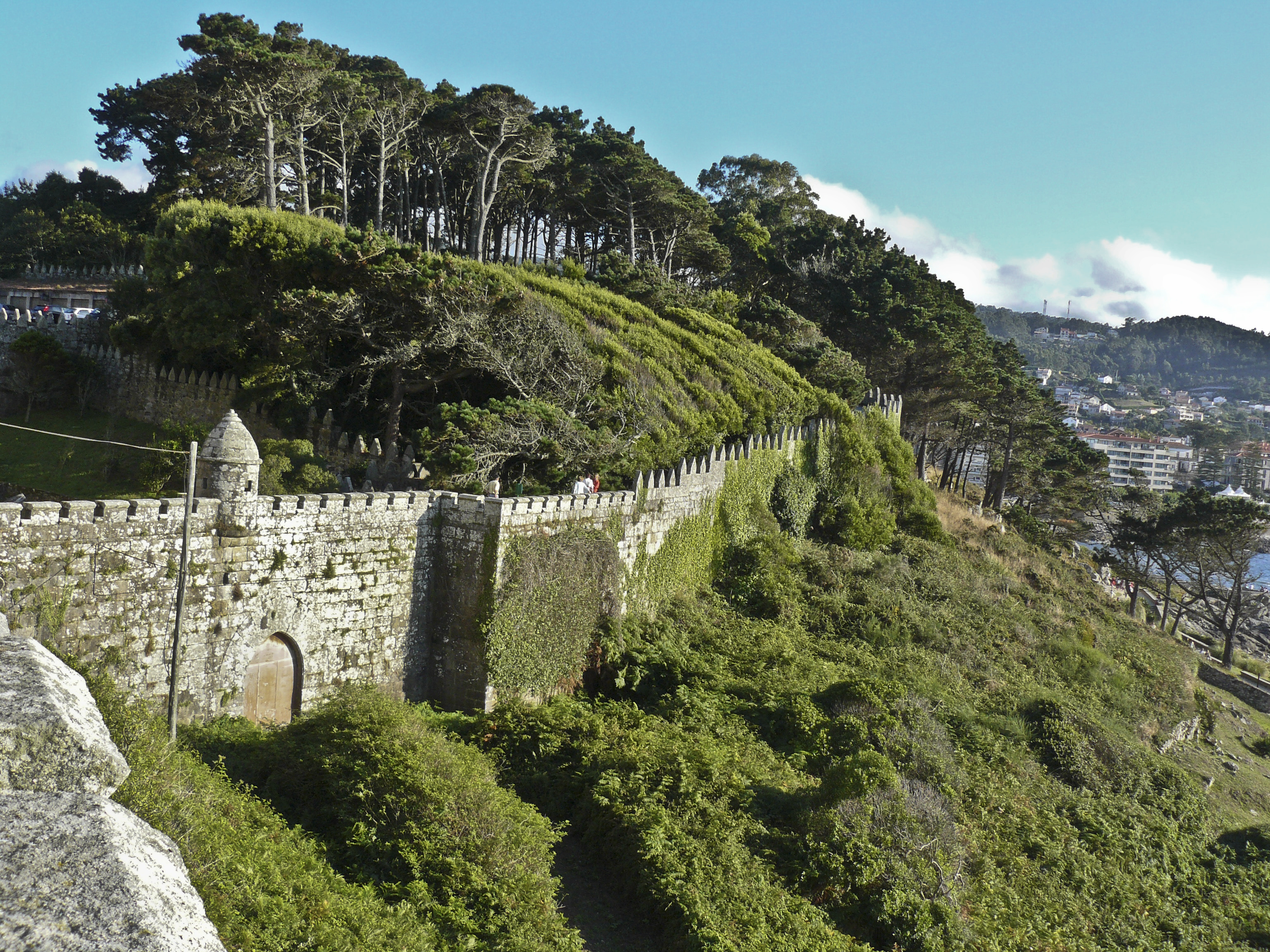
Castle of Monterreal

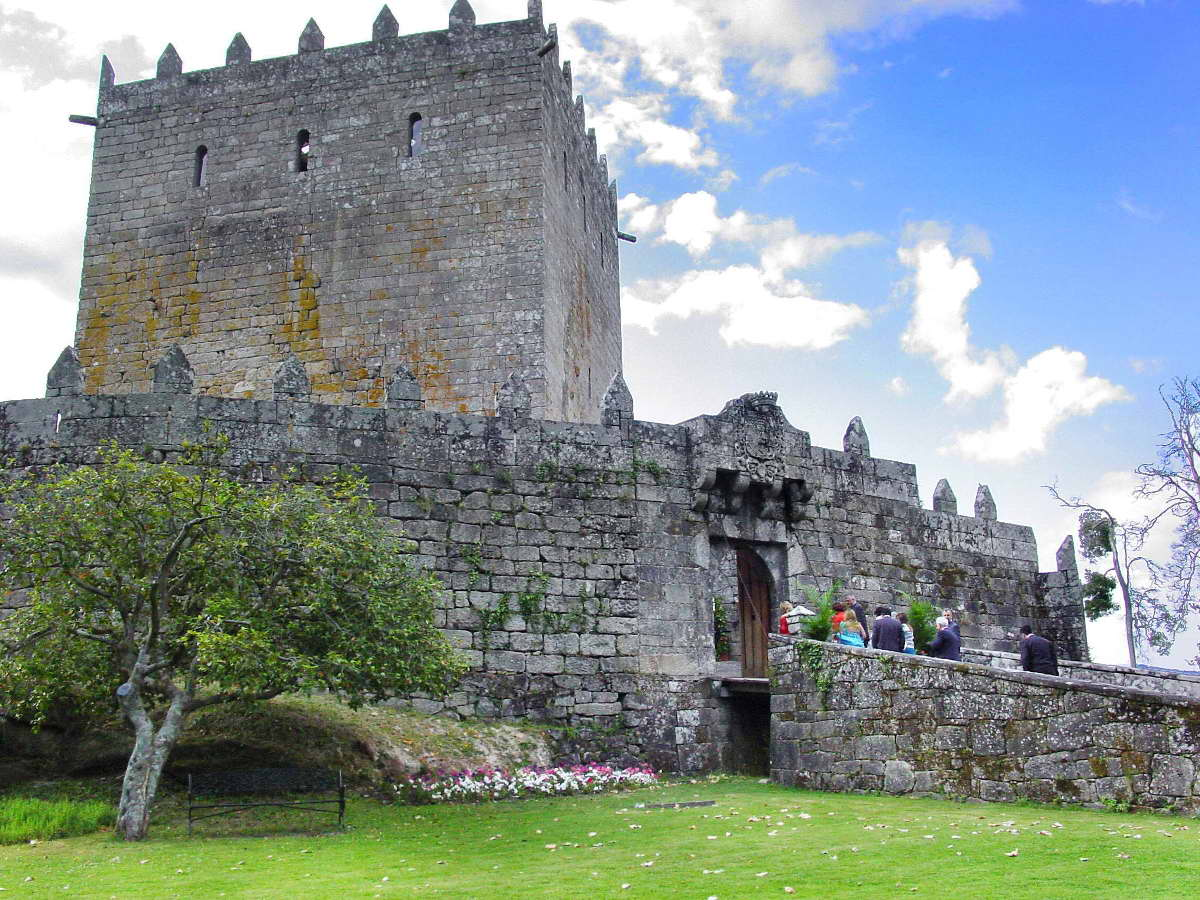
Castle of Soutomaior

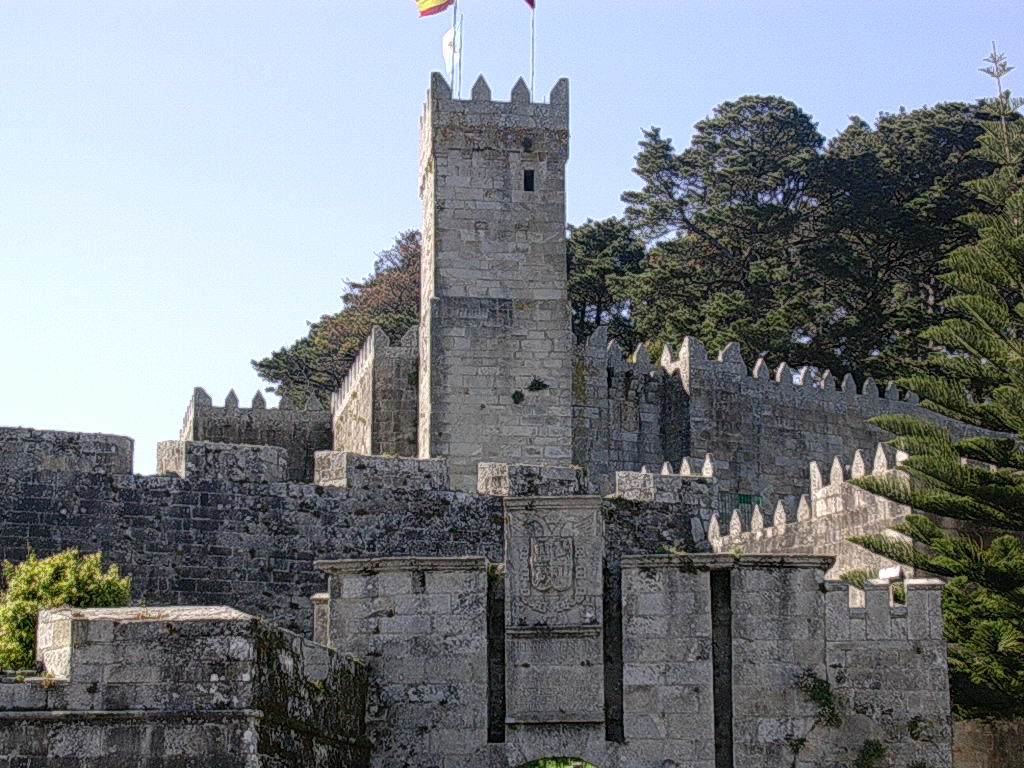
Castle of Monterreal in Baiona

=== A Coruña ===
- Castle of Naraío, (San Sadurniño)
- Castle of Andrade or Fortress da Nogueirosa, (Pontedeume)
- Castle da Lúa, (Rianxo)
- Castle da Rocha Forte, (Santiago de Compostela)
- Castle da Rocha Branca, (Padrón)
- Castle of Fruzo, (Arzúa)
- Castle of Mesía, (Mesía)
- Castle of San Carlos (Finisterre)
- Castle da Palma
- Castle of Moeche
- Castle of Vimianzo, (Vimianzo)
- Castle of Cardenal, (Corcubión)
- Castle of Casón, (Ortigueira)
- Castle do Pico Sacro, (Boqueixón)
- Castle do Príncipe, (Cee)
- Castle do Soberano, (Camariñas)
- Castle of Santo Antón
- Castle of San Felipe, (Ferrol)
- Fortress da Mota de Ois, (Coirós)
- Fort of Santa Cruz, (Oleiros)
- Torreón dos Andrade, (Pontedeume)
- Towers of Altamira, (Brión)
- Towers of Mens, (Malpica de Bergantiños)
- Towers do Allo, (Zas)
- Tower of Penela, (Cabana de Bergantiños)
- Tower of Celas de Peiro, (Culleredo)
- Tower of Cillobre, (A Laracha)
- Tower of Figueroa, (Abegondo)
- Tower of Hercules, (A Coruña)
- Tower of Lama, (Mañón)
- Tower of Nogueira, (Coristanco)
- Tower of Orseño, (Porto do Son)
- Tower of Xunqueiras, (A Pobra do Caramiñal)
- Tower do Concello, (Betanzos)
- Tower pazo de Vilardefrancos, (Carballo)
- Tower of Goiáns, (Boiro)
- Walls of Santiago de Compostela

=== Lugo ===
- Castle da Frouseira, (Foz)
- Castle da Mota (Guntín), (Guntín)
- Castle da Pobra de Parga, (Guitiriz)
- Castle of Amarante, (Antas de Ulla)
- Castle of Arcos, (Chantada)
- Castle of Burón, (A Fonsagrada)
- Castle of Caldaloba, (Cospeito)
- Castle of Carbedo, (O Courel)
- Castle do Castrodouro, (Alfoz)
- Castle of Castroverde, (Castroverde)
- Castle of Doiras, (Cervantes)
- Castle of Maside, (Pantón)
- Castle of Miraz, (Friol)
- Castle of Monforte de Lemos, (Monforte de Lemos)
- Castle of Navia, (Navia de Suarna)
- Castle of Pambre, (Palas de Rei)
- Castle of Penas, (Monterroso)
- Castle of Peñaflor, (Riotorto)
- Castle of Saavedra, (Begonte)
- Castle of Sarria, (Sarria)
- Castle of Sequeiros, (Quiroga)
- Castle of Torés, (As Nogais)
- Castle of Tovar, (Lourenzá)
- Castle of Vilalba, (Vilalba)
- Castle Tower of Novaes, (Quiroga)
- Fortress of San Paio de Narla, (Friol)
- Fort of San Damián, (Ribadeo)
- Tower Fortress of Friol, (Friol)
- Tower da Bastida, (Pantón)
- Tower da Candaira, (O Saviñao)
- Tower of Doncos, (As Nogais)
- Tower of Gorrete, (Mondoñedo)
- Tower of Hospital, (O Incio)
- Tower of Marce, (Pantón)
- Tower of Moreda, (Monforte de Lemos)
- Tower of Quindimil, (Palas de Rei)
- Tower of Sobrada, (Outeiro de Rei)
- Tower of Taboada, (Taboada)
- Tower of Taboi, (Outeiro de Rei)
- Tower of Támoga, (Cospeito)
- Tower do Mouro, (Riotorto)
- Fort-House of Lusio, (Samos)
- Tower-House of Friol, (Friol)
- Tower-House of Güimil, (O Saviñao)
- Walls of Lugo

=== Ourense ===
- Castle of Allariz, (Allariz)
- Castle of Mouresiños, (Allariz)
- Castle do Castro, (O Barco de Valdeorras)
- Castle of Queen Lupa, (Os Blancos)
- Castle of Castro Cavadoso, (Boborás)
- Tower do Bolo, (O Bolo)
- Castle da Piconha, (Calvos de Randín)
- Tower of Cabanelas, (O Carballiño)
- Tower of Sande, (Cartelle)
- Castle of Castro Caldelas, (Castro Caldelas)
- Alcázar of Milmanda, (Celanova)
- Tower of Vilanova dos Infantes, (Celanova)
- Castle of Roucos, (Cenlle)
- Castle of San Adrao, (Lobeira)
- Castle of Maceda, (Maceda)
- Castle of Manzaneda, (Manzaneda)
- Tower of Mundín, (Maside)
- Tower of Pazos, (Maside)
- Tower of A Mezquita, (A Merca)
- Castle of Lobarzán, (Monterrei)
- Castle of Monterrei, (Monterrei)
- Tower of Medeiros, (Monterrei)
- Castle of Penedos do Castro, (Nogueira de Ramuín)
- Castle of Caracochas, (Ourense)
- Castle Ramiro, (Ourense)
- Fortress of Bandexa, (Padrenda)
- Tower of Grixó, (Padrenda)
- Castle da Peroxa, (A Peroxa)
- Castle of Cinconogueiras, (A Peroxa)
- Castle of Fontearcada, (A Peroxa)
- Tower of Pena Folenche, (A Pobra de Trives)
- Tower of A Forxa, (Porqueira)
- Tower of A Sainza, (Rairiz de Veiga)
- Castle of Ribadavia, (Ribadavia)
- Castle of Sandiás, (Sandiás)
- Pazo da Torre de Soutopendo, (San Cibrao das Viñas)
- Tower of Torán, (Taboadela)
- Tower of O Olivar, (Toén)
- Fortress of Penafroufe, (Verea)
- Tower of Viana, (Viana do Bolo)
- Castle of Vilamarín, (Vilamarín)
- Tower da Pena da Portela, (Xinzo de Limia)
- Tower of A Pousa, (Xunqueira de Ambía)

=== Pontevedra ===
- Castle of Alemparte, (Fornelos de Montes)
- Castle of Cira, (Silleda)
- Castle of Fornelos, (Crecente)
- Castle of Lobeira, (Vilanova de Arousa)
- Castle of Monterreal, (Baiona)
- Castle of Salvaterra, (Salvaterra de Miño)
- Castle of Sobroso, (Mondariz)
- Castle of Soutomaior, (Soutomaior)
- Castle of Tebra, (Tomiño)
- Castle of Ubeiras, (Vilaboa)
- Castle do Penzo, (Vigo)
- Fortress of Borraxeiros, (Agolada)
- Fortress of Gondomar, (Gondomar)
- Fortress of Rodeiro, (Rodeiro)
- Fortress of San Lourenzo, (Tomiño)
- Tower-Fortress of Castro de Montes, (Forcarei)
- Towers of Miadelo, (Vilagarcía de Arousa)
- Torres de Oeste, (Catoira)
- Tower da Barreira, (A Estrada)
- Tower of A Lanzada, (O Grove)
- Tower of Camba, (Rodeiro)
- Tower of Fafián, (Rodeiro)
- Tower of Guimarei, (A Estrada)
- Tower of San Sadurniño, (Vilagarcía de Arousa)

== Community of Madrid ==
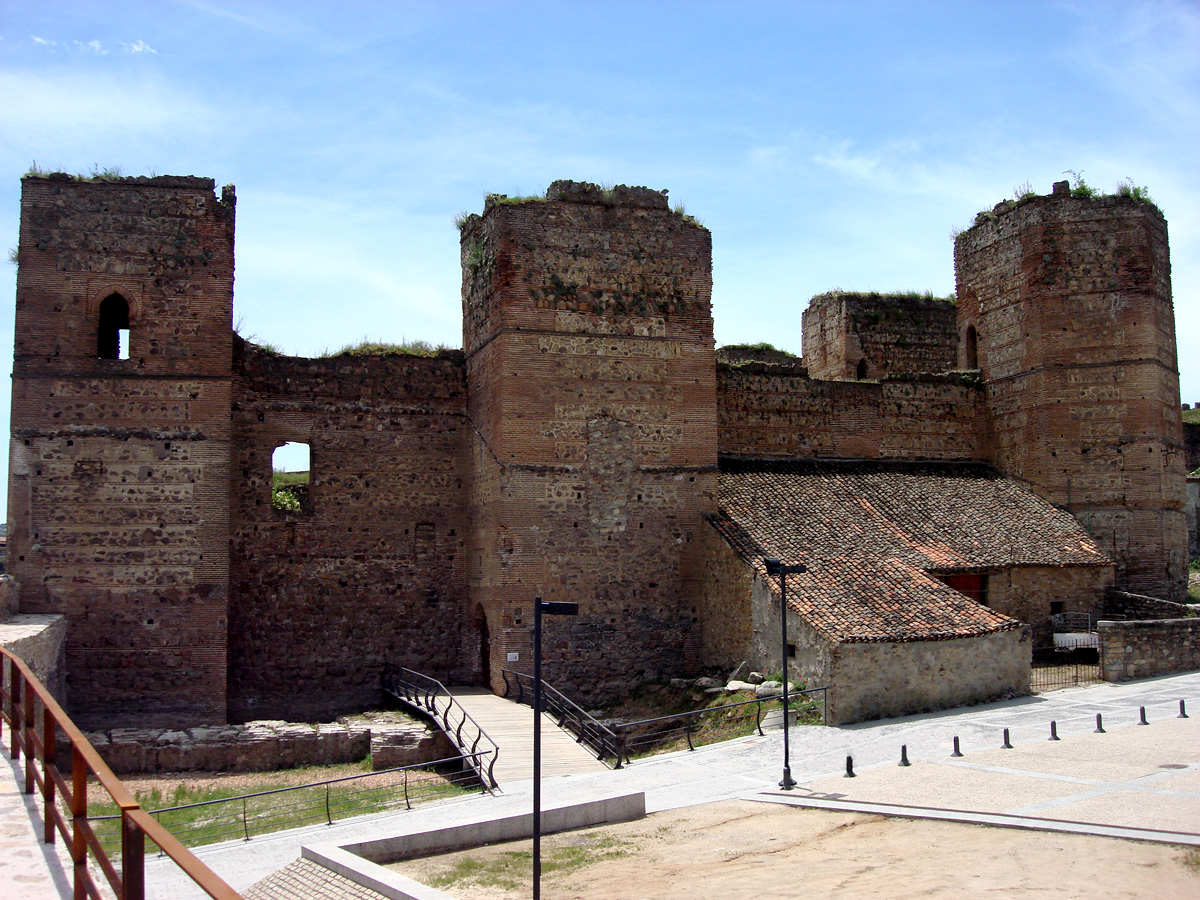
Castle of Buitrago del Lozoya

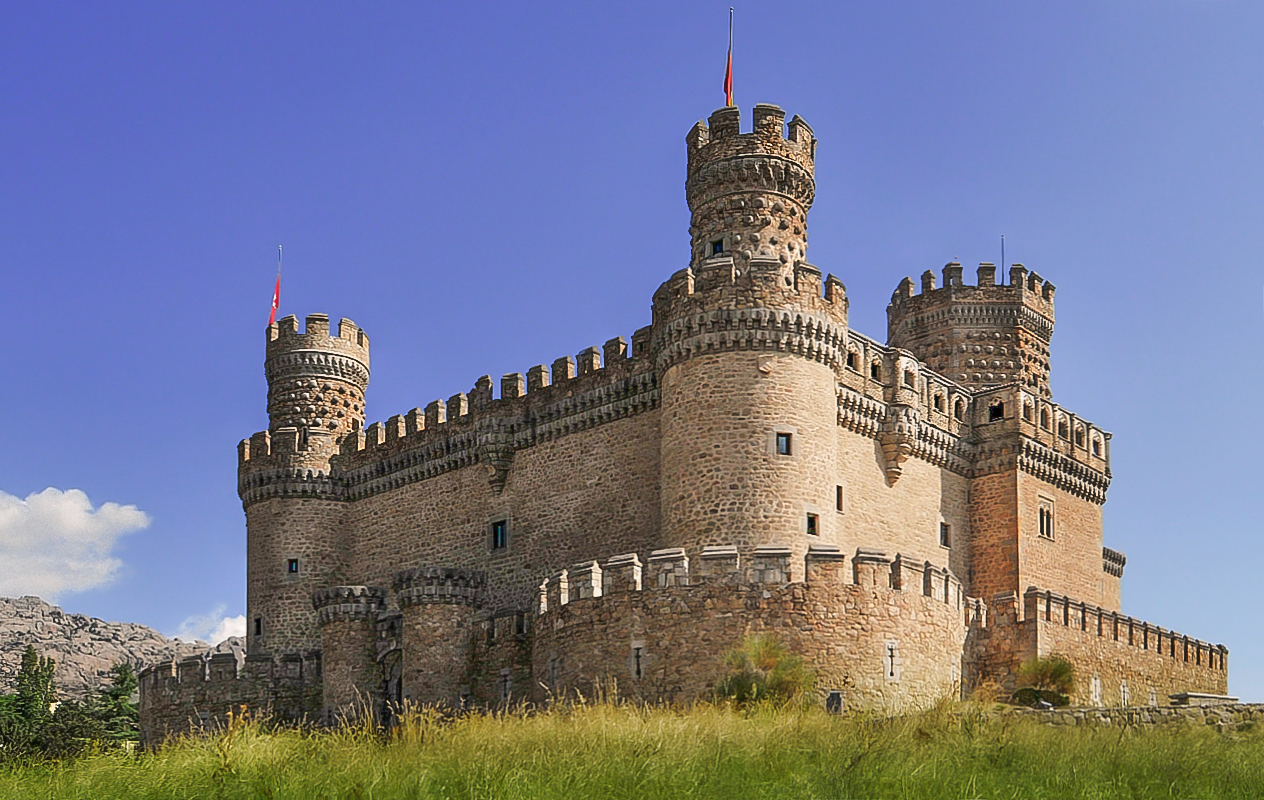
Castle of Manzanares el Real

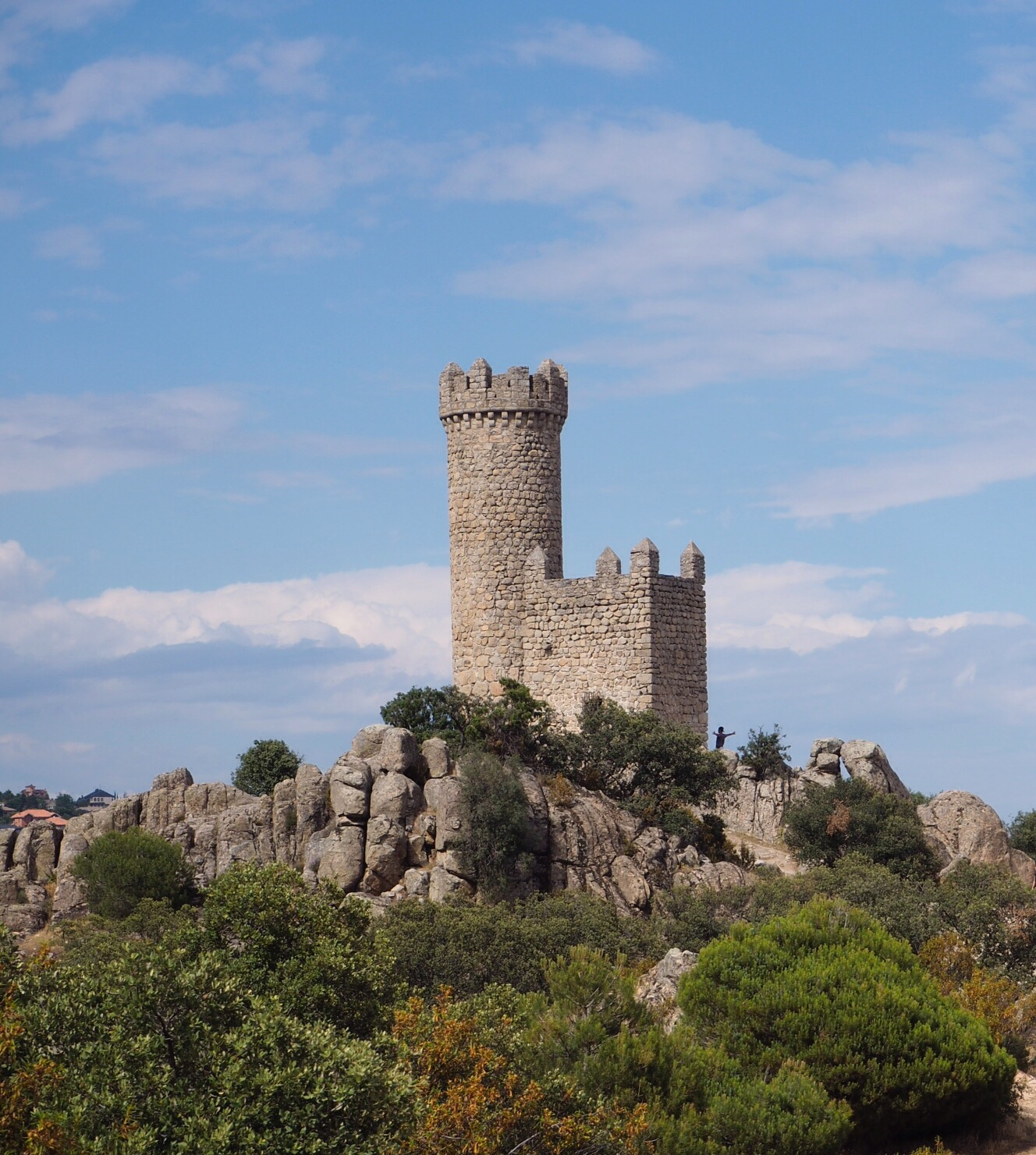
Atalaya de Torrelodones

- Castle of La Alameda (Madrid)
- Castle of Alcalá la Vieja (Alcalá de Henares)
- Castle of Aulencia
- Castle of Batres
- Castle of Buitrago del Lozoya
- Castle of Casasola (Chinchón)
- Castle of Chinchón
- Castle of la Coracera (San Martín de Valdeiglesias)
- Castle of Fuentidueña de Tajo
- New Castle of Manzanares el Real
- Old Castle of Manzanares el Real
- Castle of Torrejón de Velasco
- Castle of Torremocha (Santorcaz)
- Castle of Villarejo de Salvanés
- Castle of Villaviciosa de Odón
- Castle of Viñuelas
- Atalaya de Arrebatacapas
- Atalaya de El Berrueco
- Atalaya de El Vellón
- Atalaya de Venturada
- Atalaya de Torrelodones
- Torreón of Arroyomolinos
- Torreón of Fuentelámparas (Robledo de Chavela)
- Torreón of Pinto
- Tower of los Huesos (Madrid)
- Tower of Mirabel
- Walls of Buitrago del Lozoya
- Christian Walls of Madrid
- Muslim Walls of Madrid
- Royal Alcázar of Madrid

== Region of Murcia ==
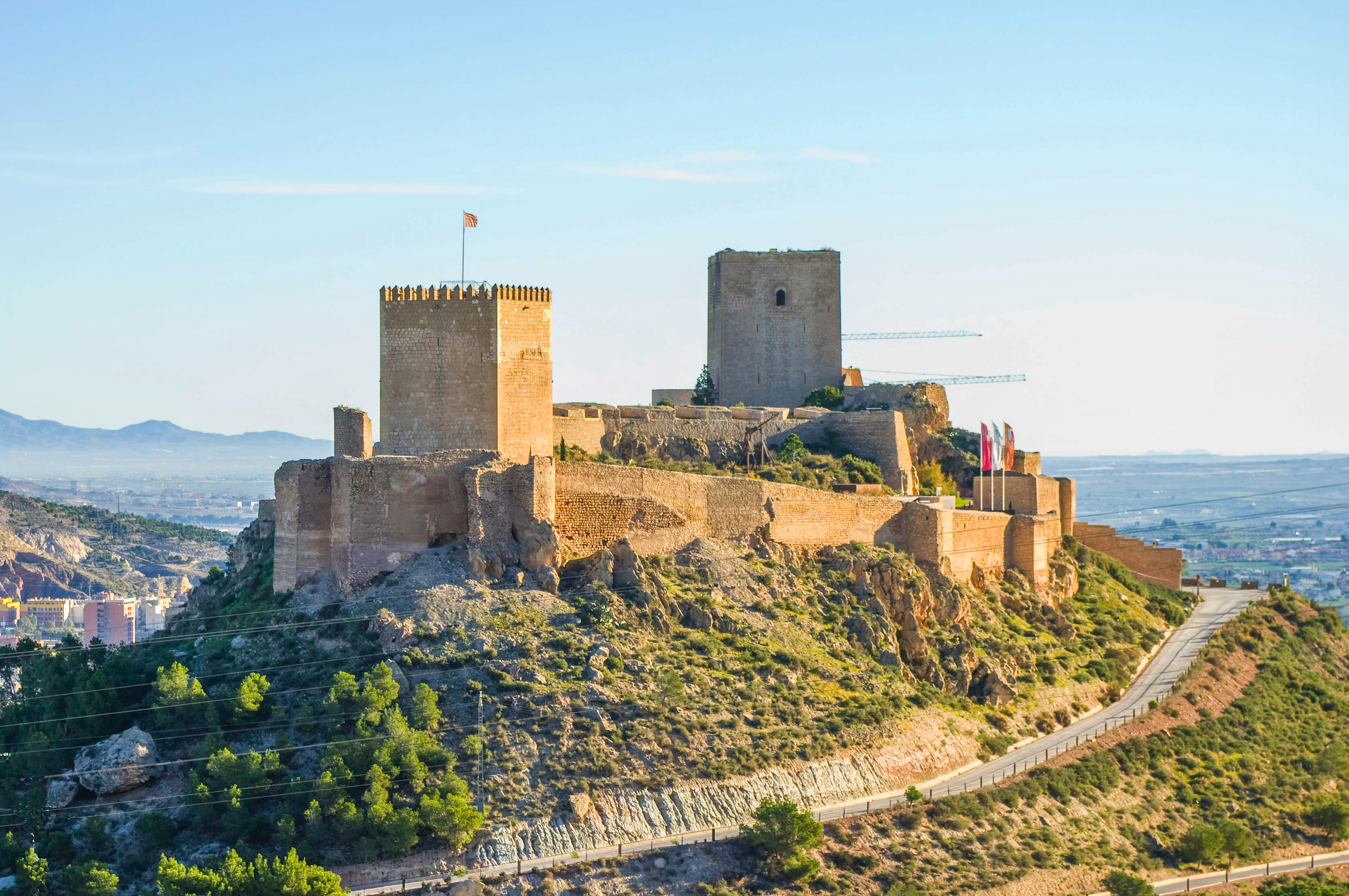
Lorca Castle

- Castle of Aledo
- Castle of San Juan de las Águilas
- Castle of Lorca
- Castle of Xiquena in Lorca
- Castle of Tirieza in Lorca
- Castle of Felí in Lorca
- Castle of la Concepción of Cartagena
- Castle of la Atalaya (Cartagena)
- Castle of Galeras of Cartagena
- Castle of San Julián (Cartagena)
- Castle of los moros of Cartagena
- Castle of Jumilla
- Castle of Monteagudo
- Castle of los Vélez in Mula
- Castle of Moratalla
- Tower fortress of Alguazas.
- Tower of Santa Elena
- Tower of Cope
- Hişn Mulīna
- Walls of Charles III

== Navarre ==
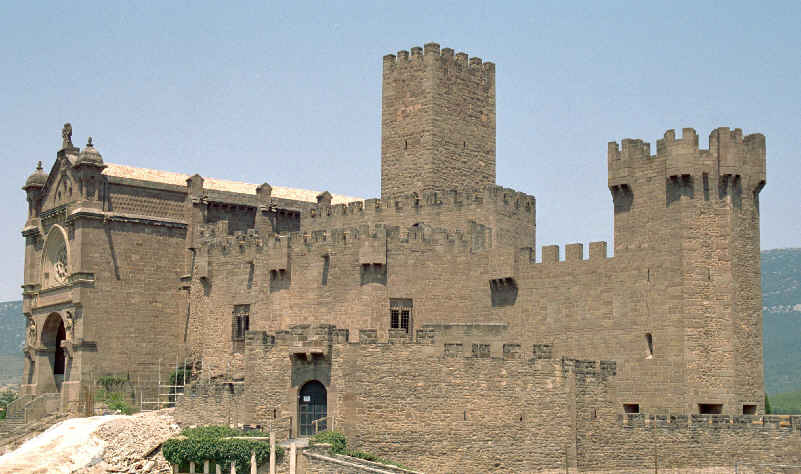
Castle of Xabier

- Alcazaba and Castle of Tudela
- Castle of Xabier
- Castle of Vélaz de Medrano
- Castle of Santakara
- Castle of Amaiur-Maya
- Castle of Monjardín
- Castle of Garaño
- Castle of Orzorrotz
- Castle of Peña (Navarre)
- Castle of Deio
- Castle of Zalatambor
- Castle palace of Martzilla
- Palace of the Kings of Navarre of Olite
- Citadel of Pamplona
- Tower Monreal
- Walls of Tudela
- Cerco de Artajona
- Old town of Pamplona

== La Rioja (Spain) ==
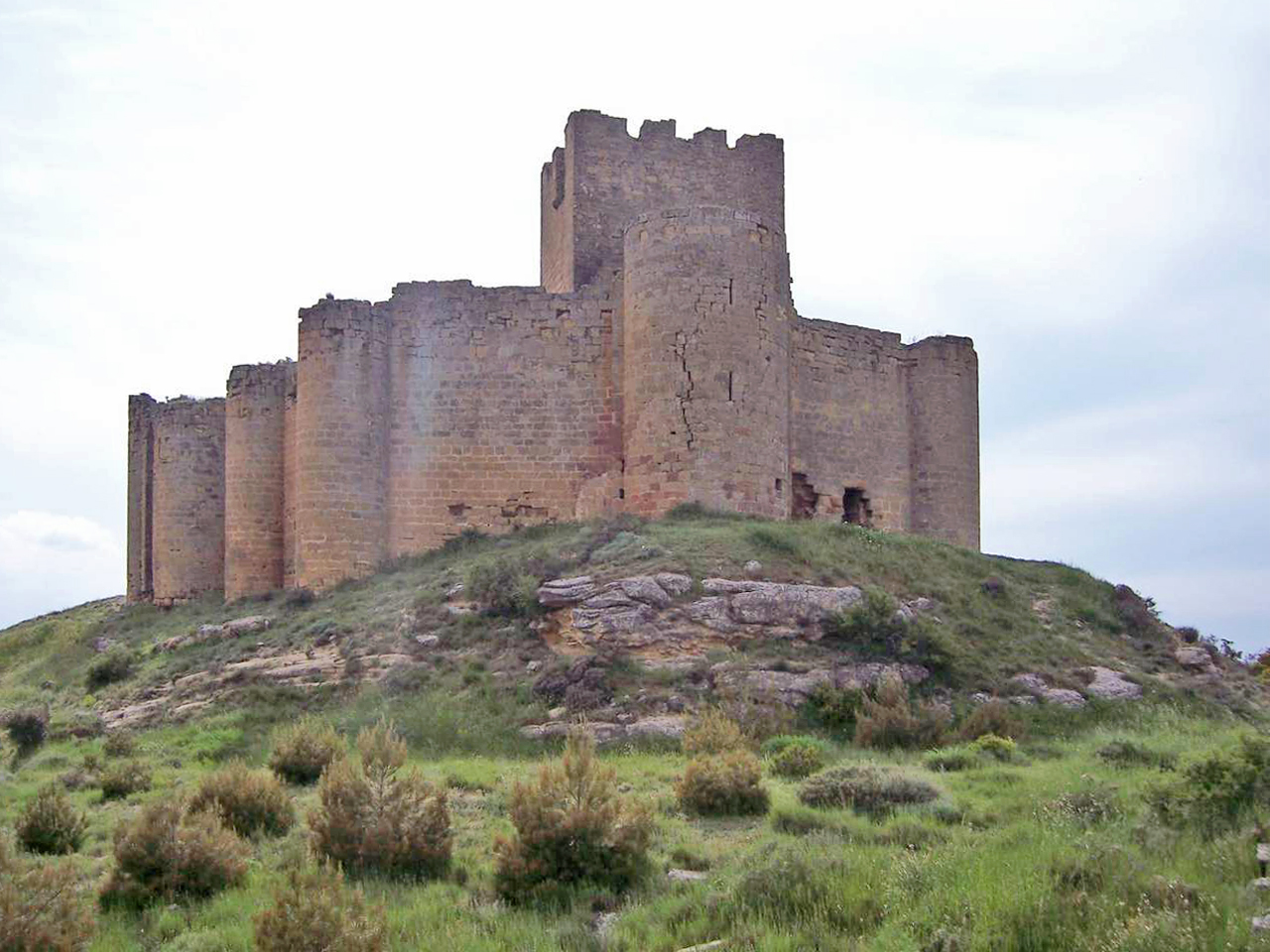
Castle of Davalillo

- Castle of Aguas Mansas in Agoncillo, restored and converted in the town hall.
- Castle of Aguilar del Río Alhama, there are only a few ruins.
- Castle of Arnedo
- Castle of Autol
- Castle of Castañares de las Cuevas
- Castle of Clavijo
- Castle of Cornago
- Castle of Davalillo
- Castle of Herce
- Castle of Jubera
- Castle of Leiva
- Castle of Quel
- Castle of Sajazarra
- Castle of San Vicente de la Sonsierra
- Castle of Cuzcurrita de Río Tirón
- Tower fort of Anguciana
- Walls of the Revellín (Logroño)

== Valencian Community ==
=== Alicante ===
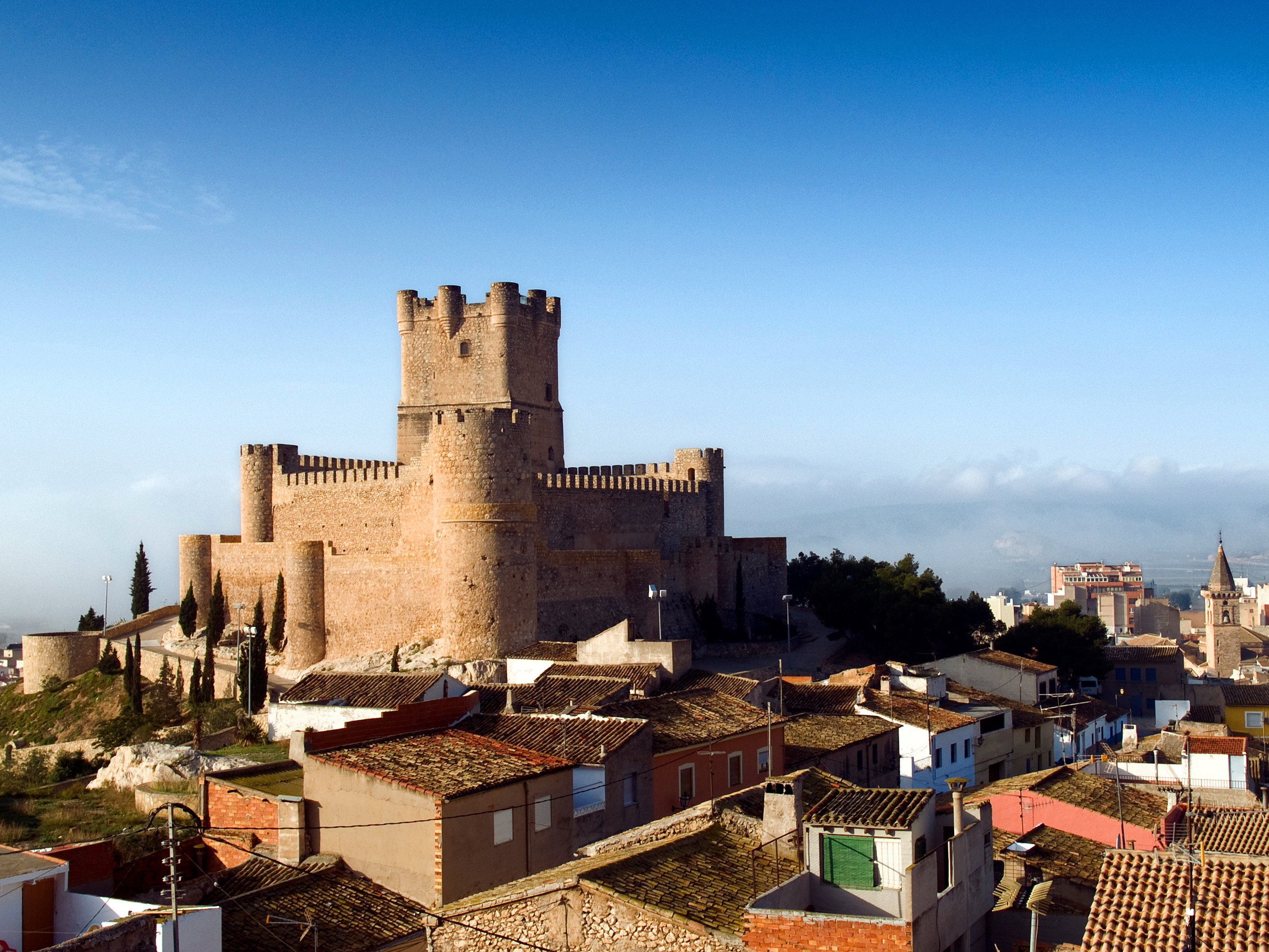
Atalaya Castle, Villena

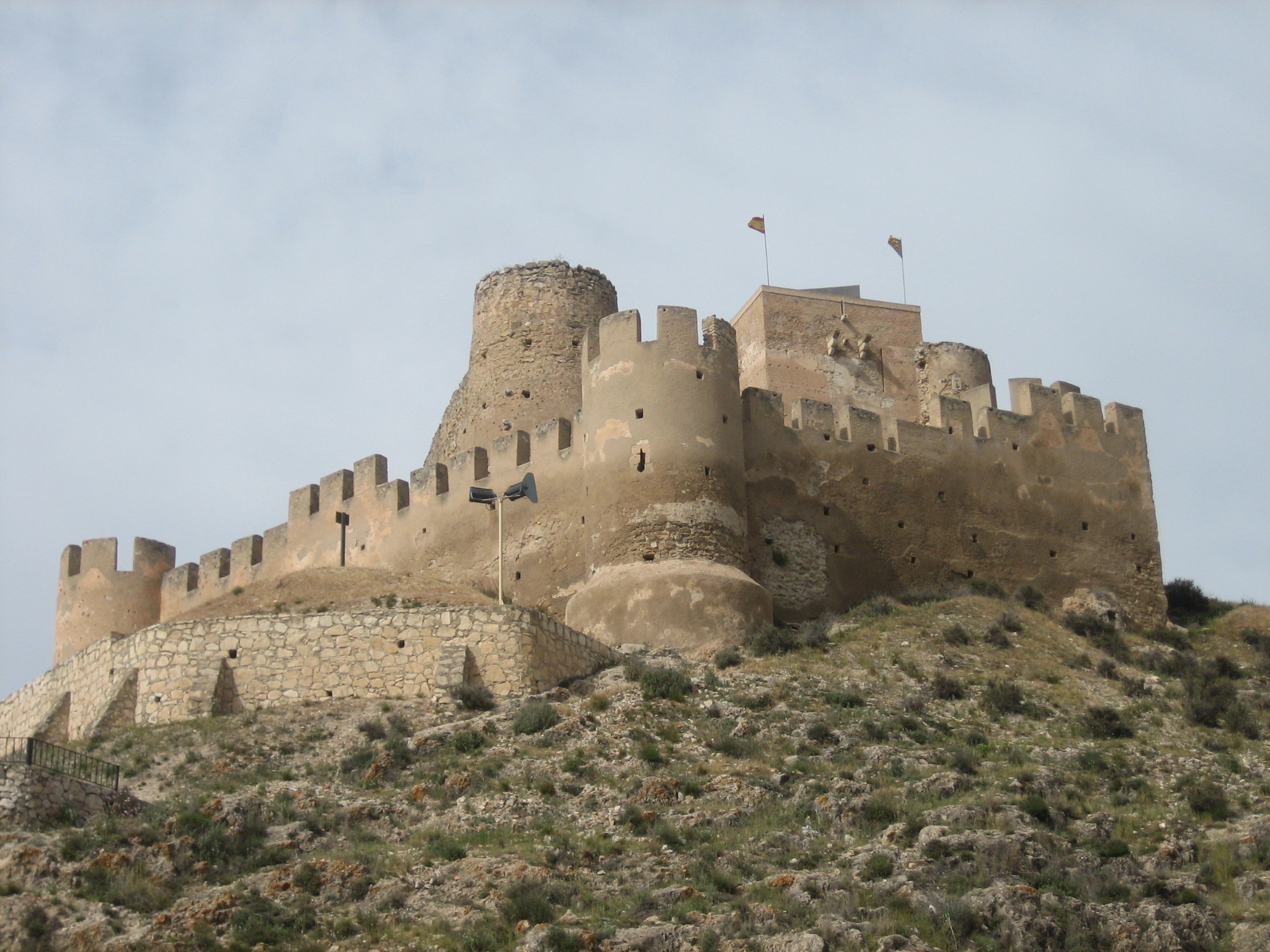
Castle of Biar

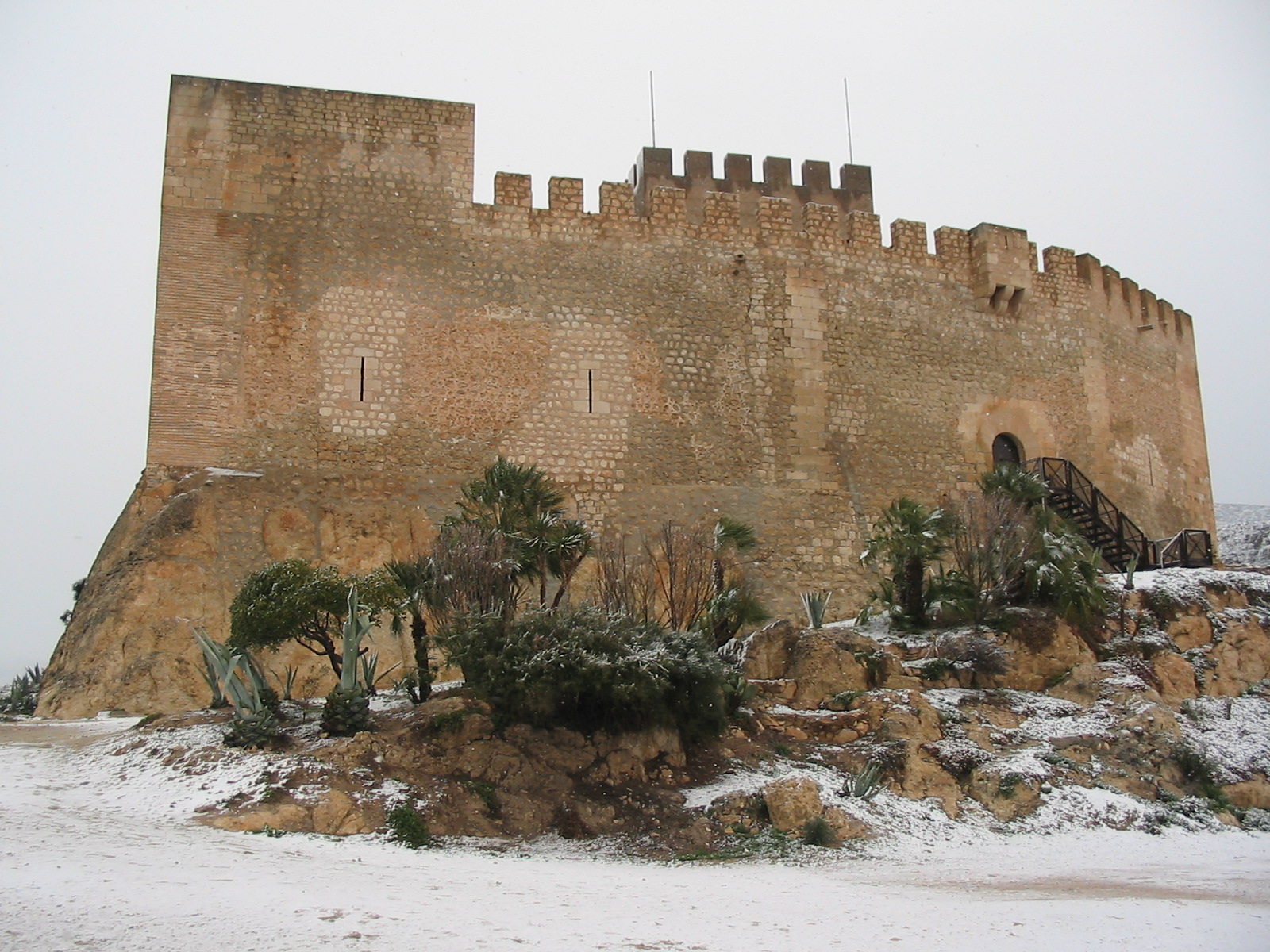
Castle of Petrer

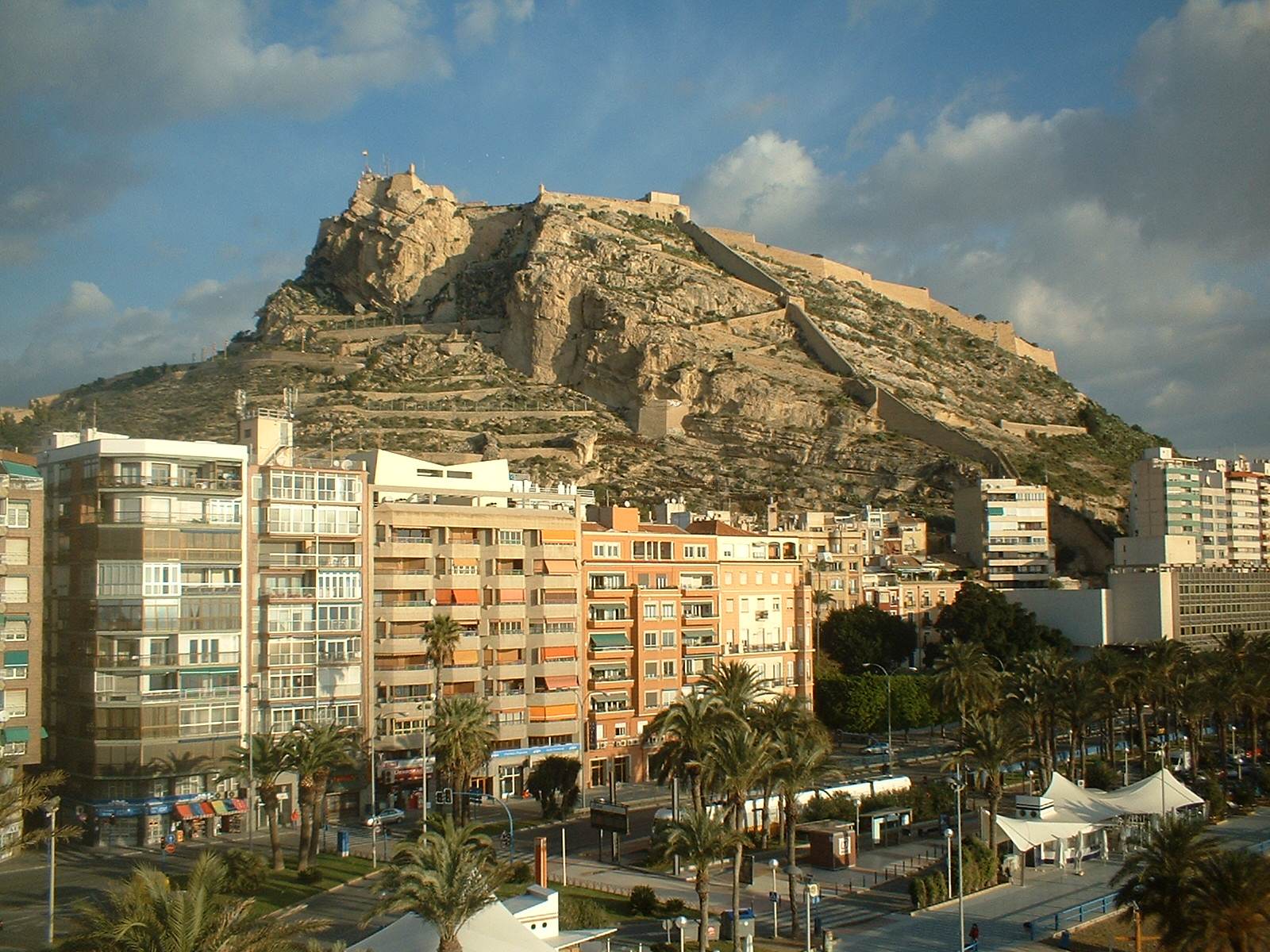
Castle of Santa Bàrbara

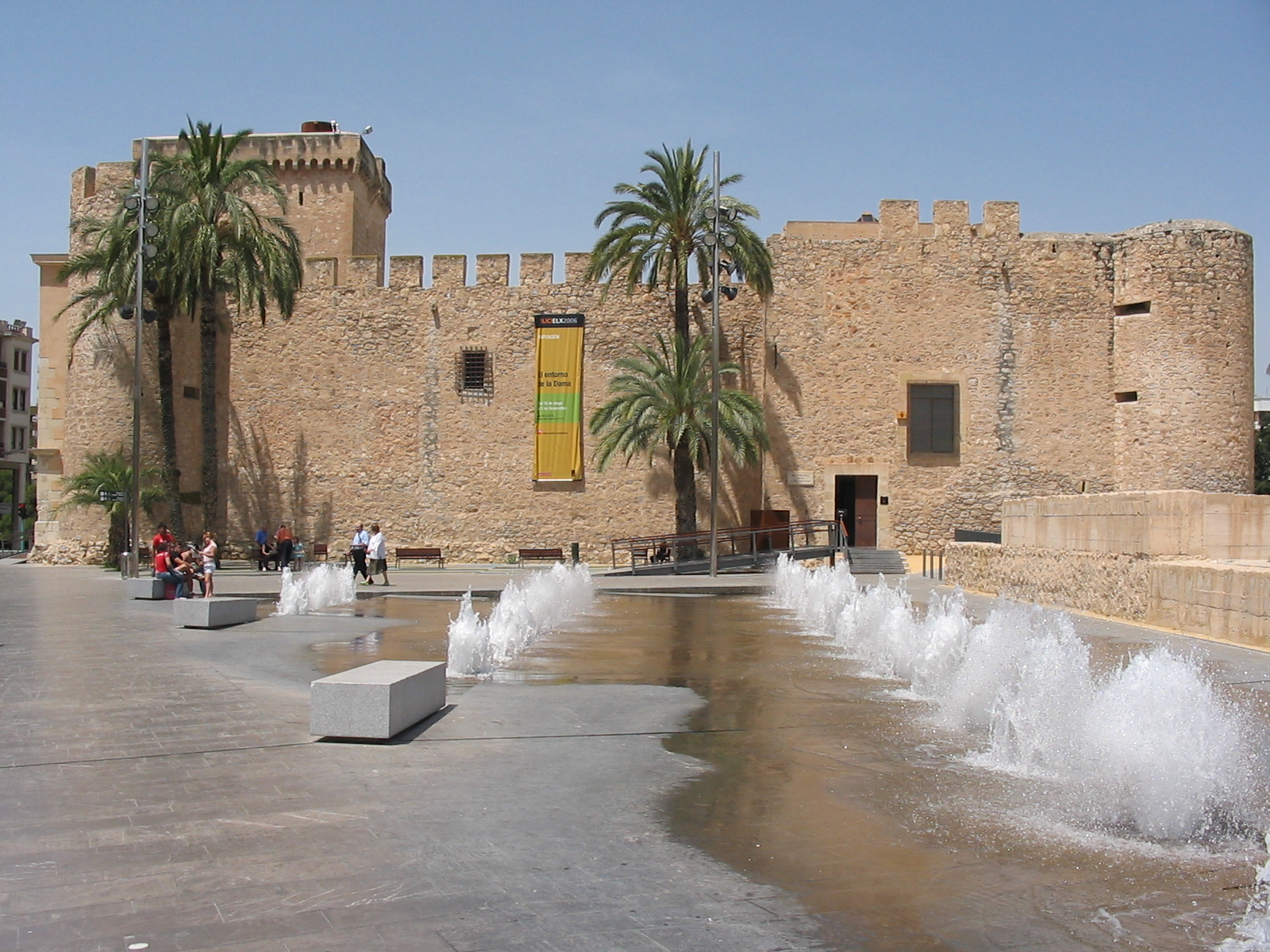
Palace of Altamira

- Castle of les Atzahares
- Castle of Agost
- Castle of Agres
- Castle of Aigües
- Castle of Aixa
- Castle of de Alfofra
- Castle of Ambra
- Castle of Banyeres
- Castle of Barchell
- Castle of Bernia
- Castle of Biar
- Castle of Castalla
- Castle of Cocentaina
- Castle of Coix
- Castle of Dénia
- Castle of Elda
- Castle of Forna
- Castle of Guardamar
- Castle of la Costurera
- Castle of la Mola
- Castle of la Murta
- Castle del Mascarat
- Castle of Monforte del Cid
- Castle of Monòver
- Castle of Montemar
- Castle of Moraira
- Castle of Orihuela
- Castle of Penàguila
- Castle of Penella
- Castle of Perputxent
- Castle of Petrer
- Castle of Polop
- Castle del Riu
- Castle of Salvatierra (Villena)
- Castle of Santa Bàrbara
- Castle of Sant Ferran (Alicante)
- Castle of Santa Pola
- Castle of Saix
- Castle of Villena or Castle of la Atalaya
- Castle of Tàrbena
- Castle of Tibi
- Palace of Altamira
- Tower Águilas
- Tower del Aguiló
- Tower of Alcalalí
- Tower del Barranc d'Aigües
- Tower of Beneixama
- Tower of Cap Roig
- Tower del Cap d'Or
- Tower del Carabassí (Santa Pola)
- Tower of Embergonyes
- Tower of Escaletes or Tower del Pep
- Tower of la Calaforra
- Tower of la Casota
- Tower of la Font Bona
- Tower of la Horadada
- Tower of la Talaiola (Santa Pola)
- Towers of Monserrate (Orihuela)
- Tower del Gerro
- Tower del Moro (Torrevieja)
- Tower del Negret
- Tower of Tamarit
- Torreta de Canor
- Walls of Orihuela
- Walls of Tabarca

=== Castellón ===
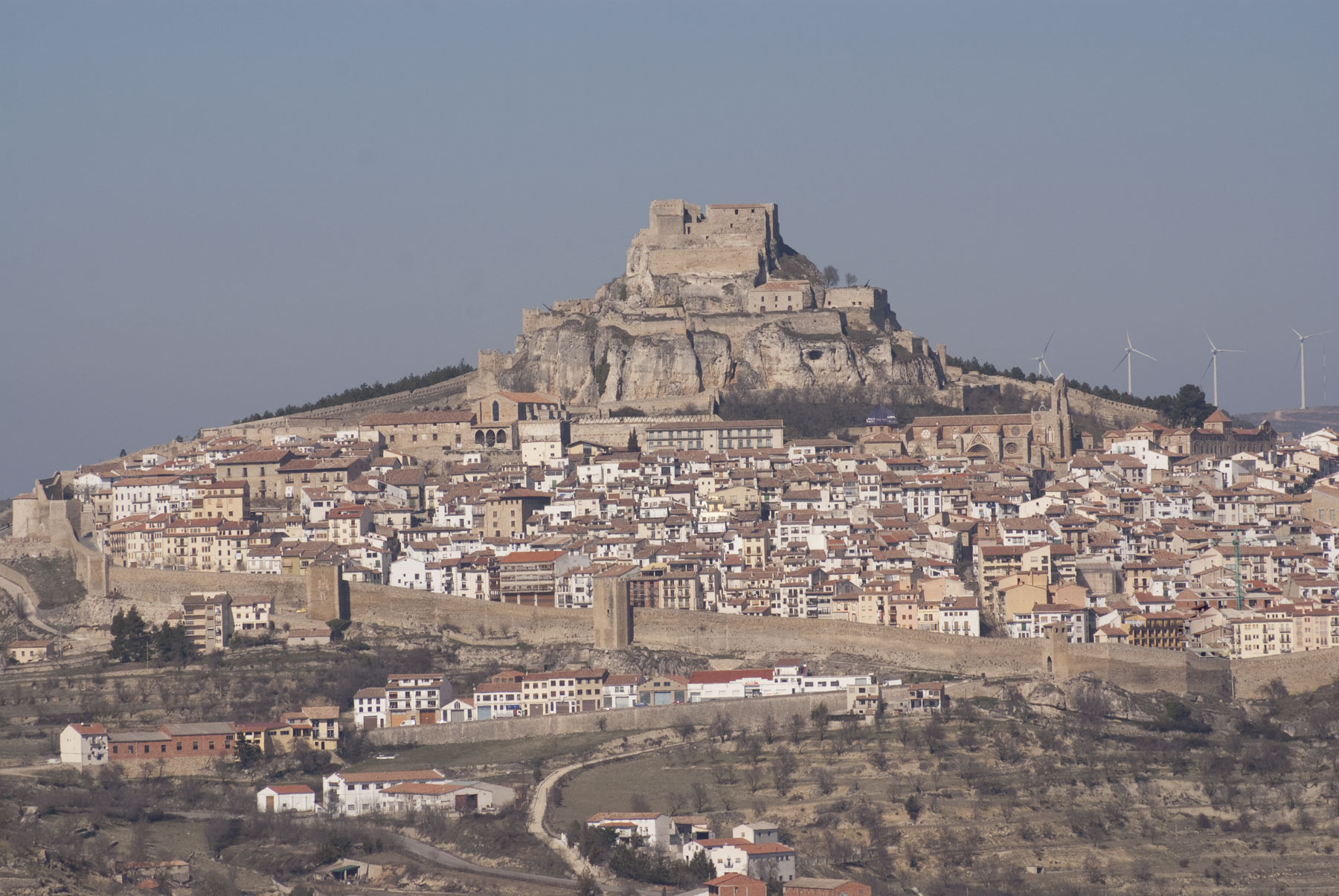
Castle of Morella

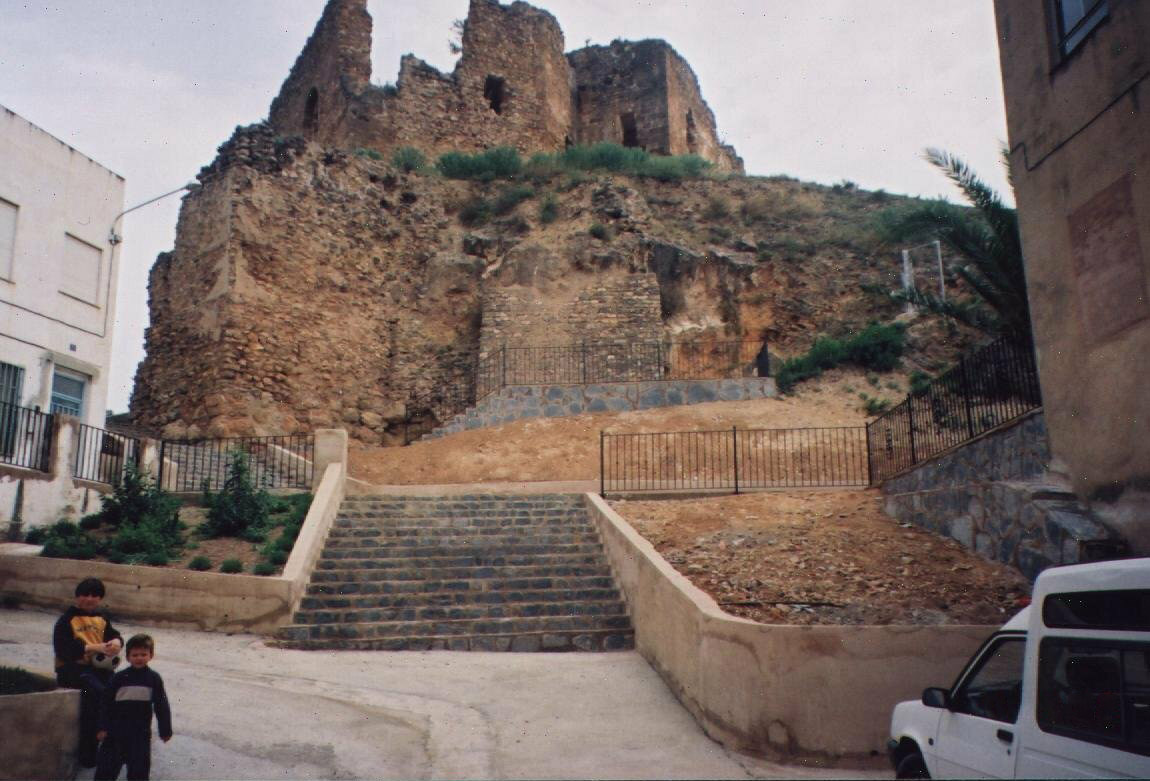
Castle of Castellnovo

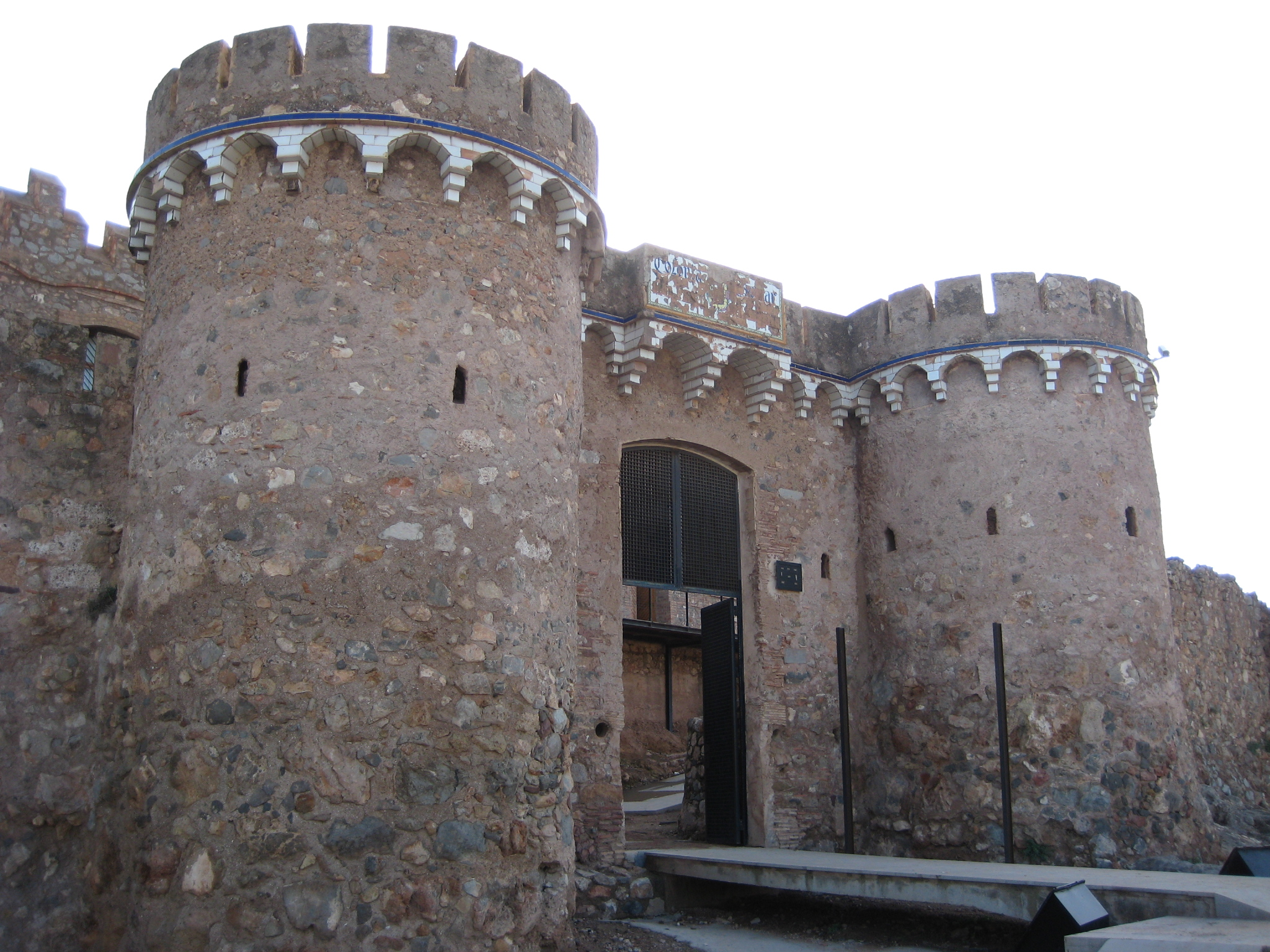
Castle of Onda

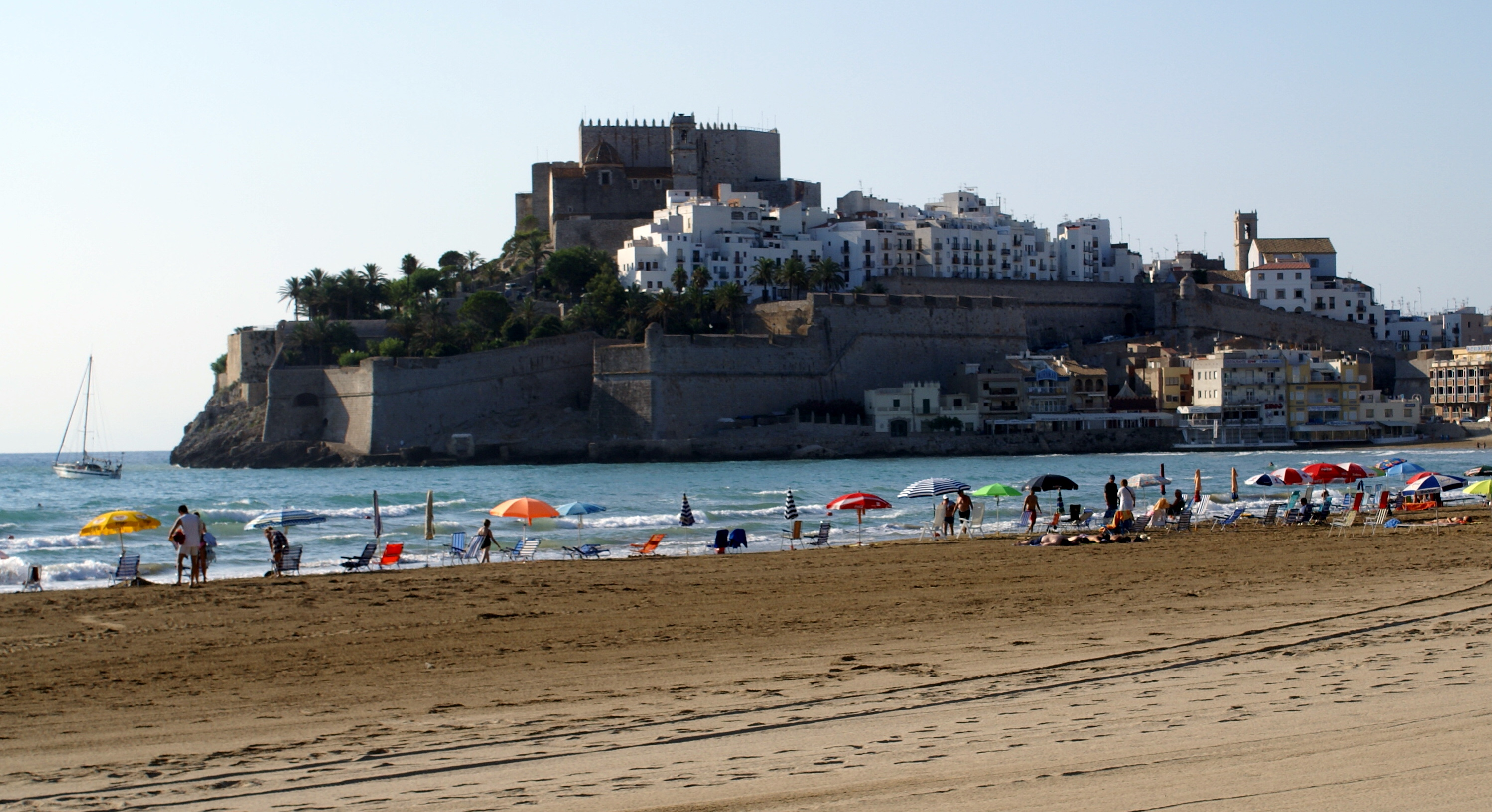
Castle of Peñíscola

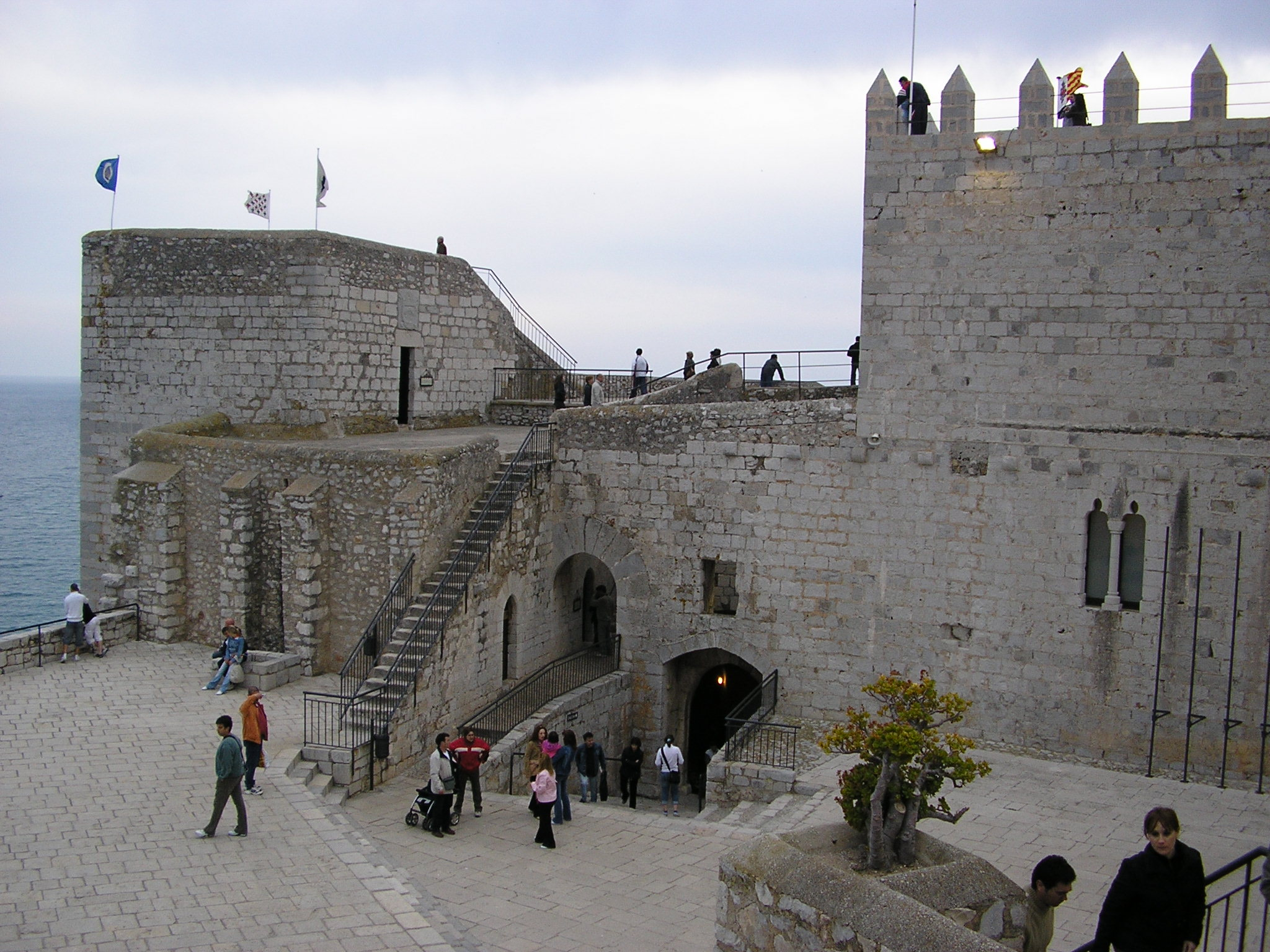
Castle of Peñíscola

- Castle of Abenromà
- Castle of Atzeneta
- Castle of Albalat dels Ànecs^{es}
- Castle of Albocàsser
- Castle of Alcalatén
- Castle of Alcudia de Veo
- Castle of Almenara
- Castle of Almonacid
- Castle of Artana
- Castle of Ayódar
- Castle of Azuébar
- Castle of Benalí
- Castle of Borriol
- Castle del Bou Negre
- Castle of Castellnovo
- Castle of Castro
- Castle of Cervera del Maestre
- Castle of El Toro
- Castle of Eslida
- Castle of Espadilla^{es}
- Castle of Fadrell
- Castle of Fanzara
- Castle of Ganalur
- Castle of Herbers
- Castle of La Todolella
- Castle of les Torrocelles
- Castle of Mauz
- Castle of Mirabet (Cabanes)
- Castle of Montornés
- Castle of Morella
- Castle of Olocau
- Castle of Onda
- Castle of Peniscola
- Castle of Tales
- Castle of Toga
- Castle of Vialeva
- Castle of Vilafamés
- Castle of Villamalur
- Castle of Xinquer
- Castle of Xivert
- Castle-palace of the Ximénez d'Urrea or Castle of Urrea
- Palace-castle of Betxí
- Tower of Càlig
- Tower of Cap i Corb
- Tower del Marqués or Tower of Na Blanca
- Tower Ebrí
- Tower of L'Oró
- Tower del Mal Paso
- Tower dels Moros (Cinctorres)
- Tower del Pilón
- Tower of Anníbal
- Tower Quadrada de Argelita
- Tower Redonda (Argelita)
- Tower of Sant Vicent (Benicàssim)
- Tower of Torrechiva
- Fortified town of Torralba del Pinar

=== Valencia ===
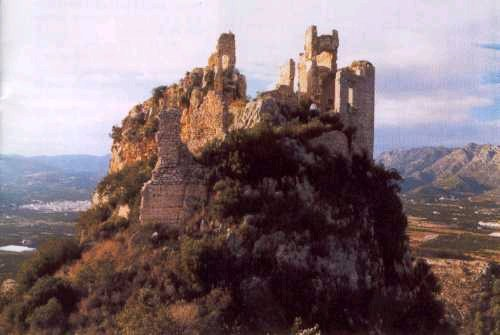
Castle of Marinyén

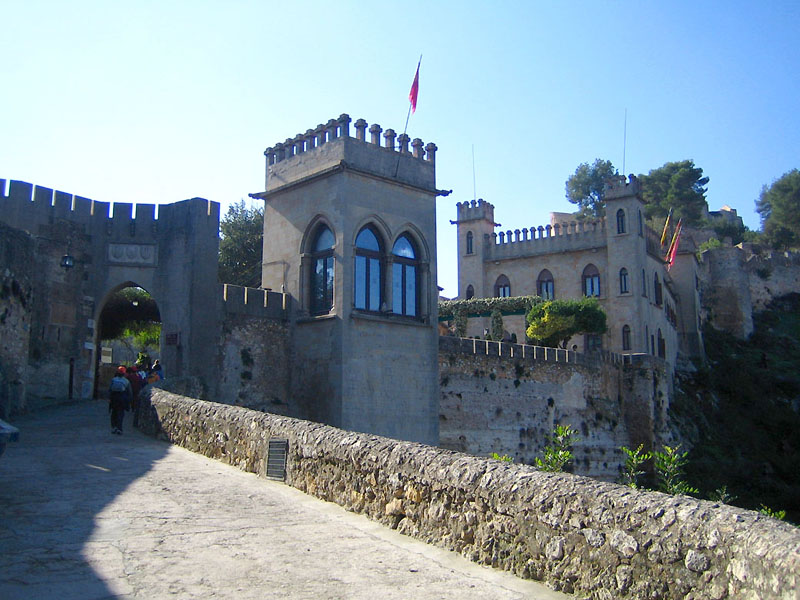
Xativa Castle

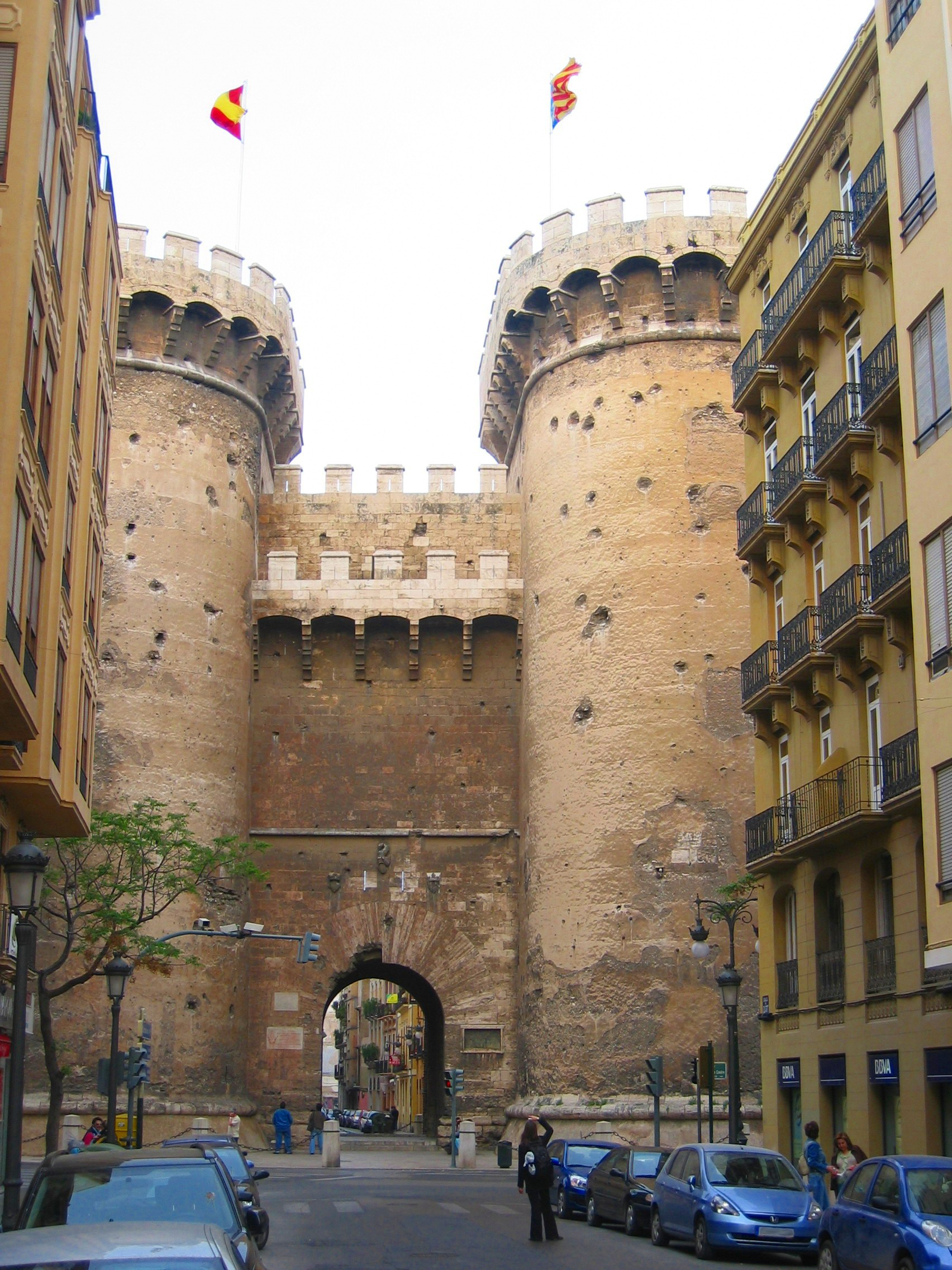
Towers of Quart

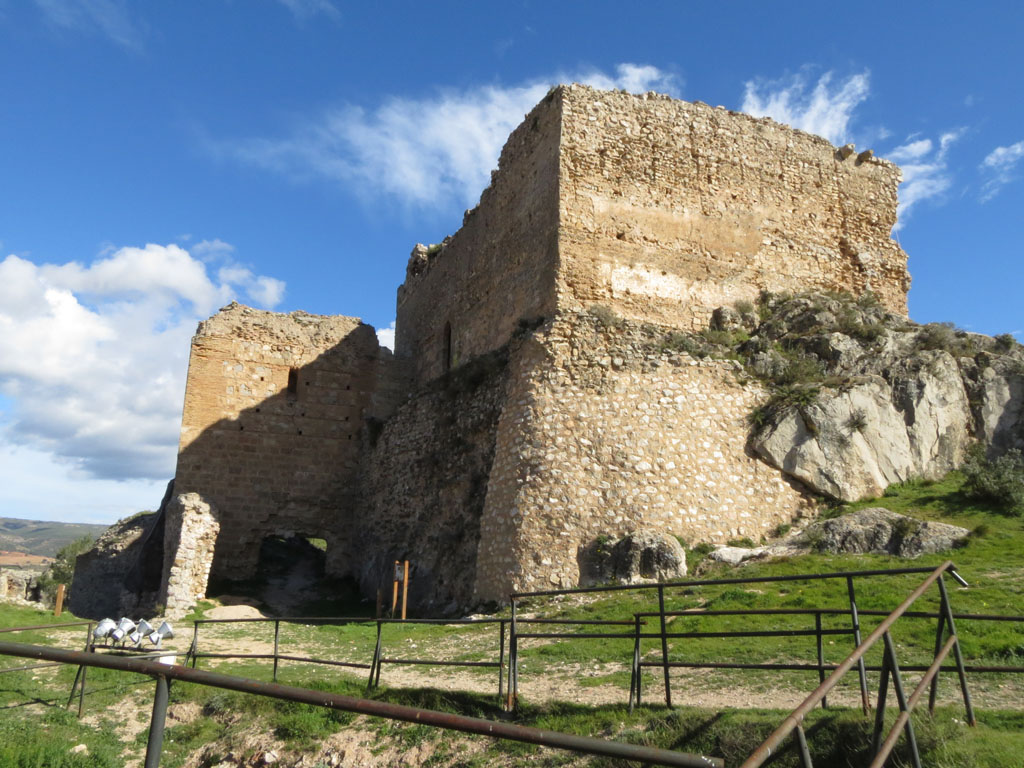
Castle of Ayora

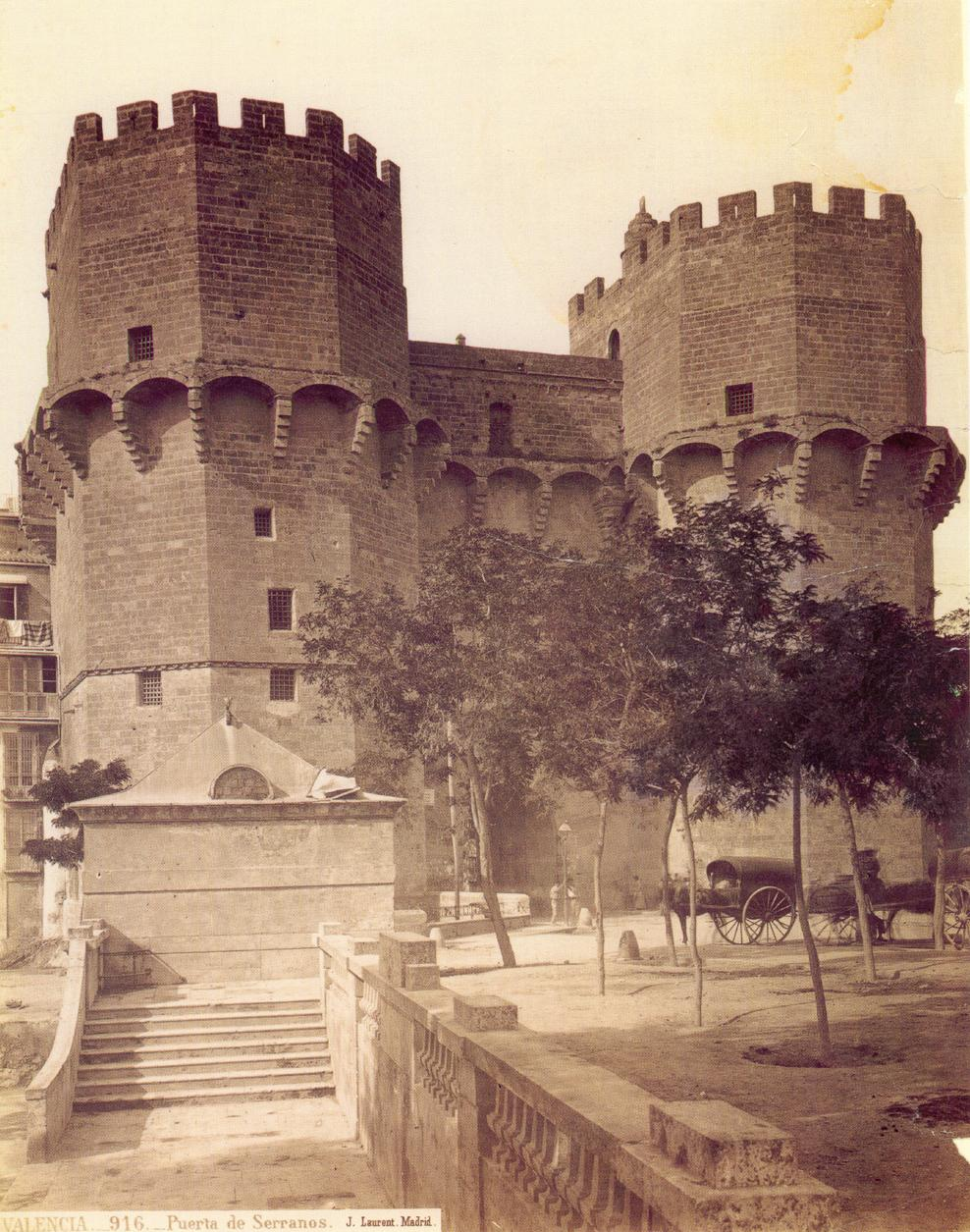
Towers of Serrano in 1870

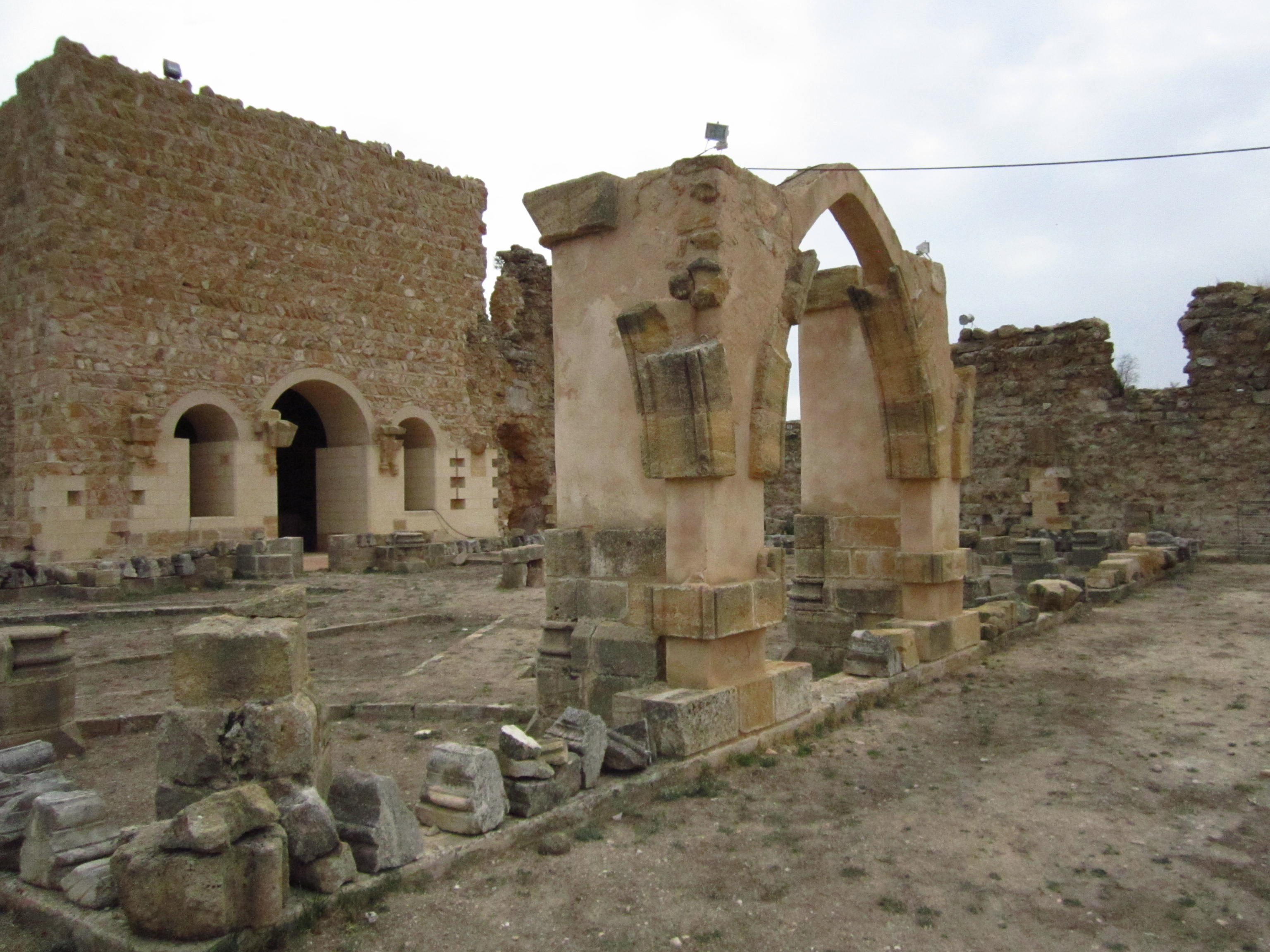
Castle of Montesa

- Castle of Ademús^{es}
- Castle of Ademús^{es}
- Castle of Albalat dels Sorells^{es}
- Castle of Aledua^{es}
- Castle of Alginet^{es}
- Castle of Andilla^{es}
- Castle of Ayora^{es}
- Castle of Bairén^{es}
- Castle of Benissanó^{es}
- Castle of Beselga^{es}
- Castle of Bolbaite^{es}
- Castle of Buñol^{es}
- Castle of Carrícola^{es}
- Castle of Castielfabib
- Castle of Cebolla^{es}
- Castle of Chera
- Castle of Corbera
- Castle of Cullera
- Castle of Dénia
- Castle of El Puig
- Castle of Jalance
- Castle of Jarafuel
- Castle of Macastre
- Castle of Marinyén
- Castle of Millares
- Castle of Moixent
- Castle of Montesa
- Castle of Montroy
- Castle of Navarrés
- Castle del Piló
- Castle of Quesa
- Castle of Rugat
- Castle of Sagunto
- Castle of Segart
- Castle of Serra
- Castle of Sot de Chera
- Castle of Sumacàrcer
- Castle of Torres Torres
- Castle of Turís
- Castle of Vallada
- Castle of Villalonga
- Castle of Xàtiva
- Castle of Xera
- Castle of Xio
- Castle of Xiva
- Castle of Xulilla
- Castle palace of Bicorp
- Palace - Castle of Alaquàs
- Palace - Castle of Albalat dels Sorells
- Palace Castle of Aielo de Malferit
- Fortress of Requena
- Tower of the Castle of Torrent
- Torre de la Plaça (Benifaió)
- Tower del Marenyet
- Tower Mussa or Tower of L'Horta
- Towers of Quart
- Towers of Serrans
- La Torrecilla (Chelva)
- Tower of Paterna
- Tower of Santa Anna
- Walls of Alzira

== Number of fortifications by provinces ==
In the following table, are related the various Spanish provinces, ordered according to the number of existing fortifications, both castles themselves as towers, watchtowers, bunkers, walls and castros

It attached the references to some of the relevant statements of Cultural Assets of the different Councils of Culture of the Autonomous Communities:

- Andalusia: Councils of Culture of the Junta de Andalucía

Province	Total of fortifications	Castles and similars	Towers, watchtowers and bunkers	Walls and castros	Others
Jaén	237	97	126	14	1
Almería	126	81	54	54	14
Guadalajara	198	124	27	44	3
Cuenca	175	100	30	32	13
Cádiz	161	37	71	31	1
Soria	121	49	41	24	7
Zaragoza	105	82	9	10	4
Barcelona	104	97	0	0	7
Navarra	95	61	8	15	11
Teruel	95	56	12	16	11
Burgos	91	44	28	16	3
Cáceres	84	67	3	11	3
Biscay	78	4	65	6	3
Alicante	73	45	20	7	1
Huesca	70	59	4	6	1
Toledo	70	46	7	12	5
Lleida	68	52	10	6	0
Madrid	67	30	18	15	4
Valencia	63	37	11	13	2
Badajoz	62	48	2	11	1
Murcia	58	43	7	7	1
Castellón	58	30	11	14	3
Albacete	52	34	6	11	1
Valladolid	50	35	2	12	1
Tarragona	48	46	1	1	0
La Rioja	48	27	11	8	2
León	47	30	7	10	0
Álava	45	6	31	8	0
Salamanca	41	24	7	10	0
Ciudad Real	36	27	4	4	1
Girona	35	22	2	10	1
Segovia	32	15	5	10	2
Ávila	29	21	1	6	1
Balearic Islands	28	12	15	1	0
Cantabria	28	8	14	6	0
Lugo	26	25	0	1	0
Palencia	25	18	4	3	0
Zamora	25	13	1	9	2
Asturias	24	7	10	7	0
Santa Cruz de Tenerife	24	10	8	1	0
Ourense	18	15	0	2	1
A Coruña	14	14	0	0	0
Las Palmas	12	8	3	1	0
Ceuta	11	2	6	2	1
Pontevedra	10	9	1	0	0
Melilla	9	5	0	4	0
Gipuzkoa	5	3	1	1	0
