= Zaorejas =

Zaorejas, Spain
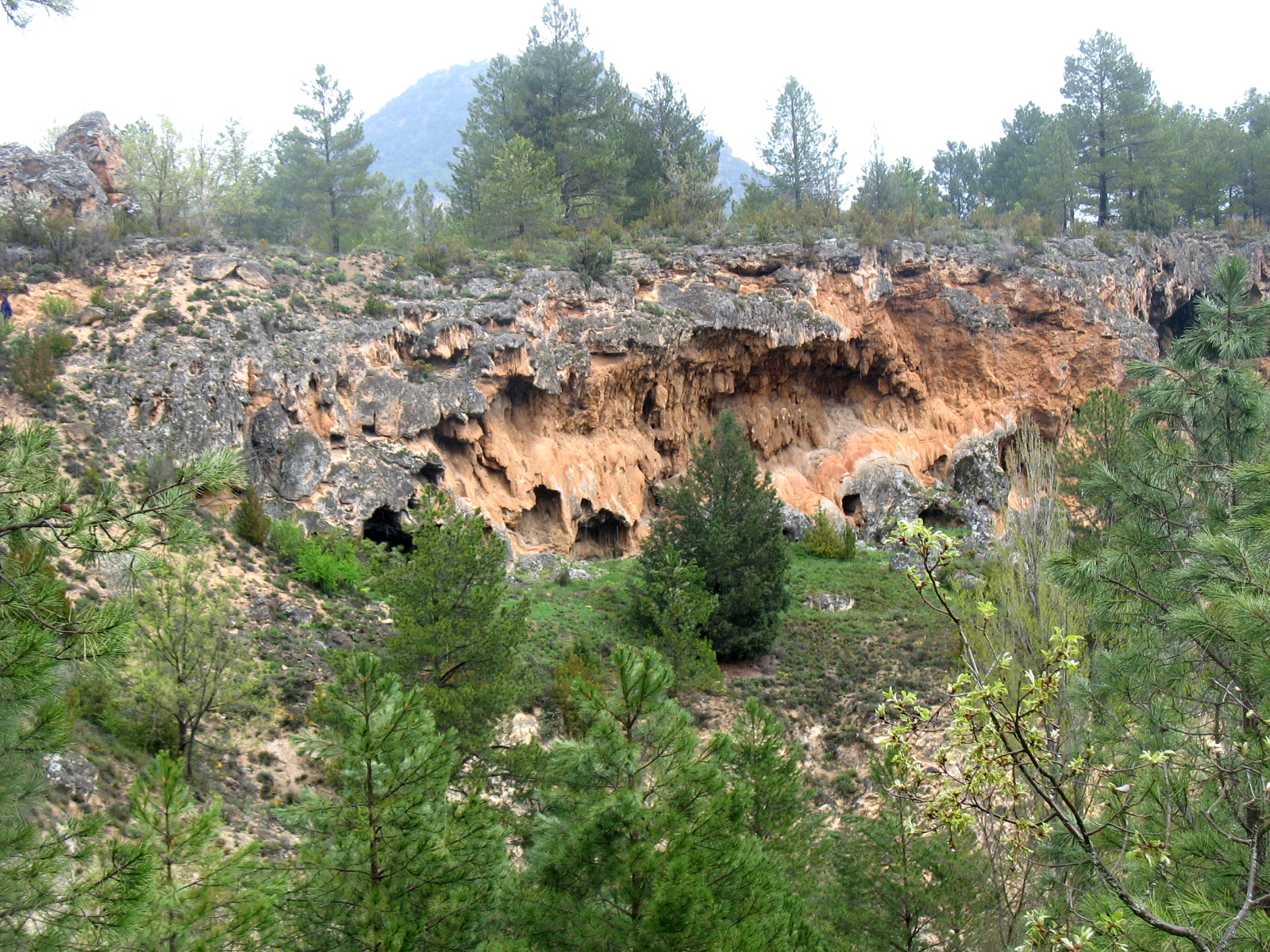

- Coat of arms

- Location in Spain Zaorejas (Castilla-La Mancha) Zaorejas (Spain)
- Coordinates: 40°45′44″N 2°12′4″W
- Country: Spain
- Autonomous community: Castile-La Mancha
- Province: Guadalajara
- Municipality: Zaorejas

Area
  - Total: 189 km^{2} (73 sq mi)
- Elevation: 1,225 m (4,019 ft)

Population (2025-01-01)
  - Total: 117
  - Density: 0.619/km^{2} (1.60/sq mi)
- Time zone: UTC+1 (CET)
  - Summer (DST): UTC+2 (CEST)

Zaorejas is a municipality located in the province of Guadalajara, Castile-La Mancha, Spain. According to the 2004 census (INE), the municipality had a population of 197 inhabitants.

There are remains of a Roman aqueduct in the village.

Two other settlements, Huertapelayo and Villar de Cobeta, are part of the municipality.
