= Huertapelayo =

- Village
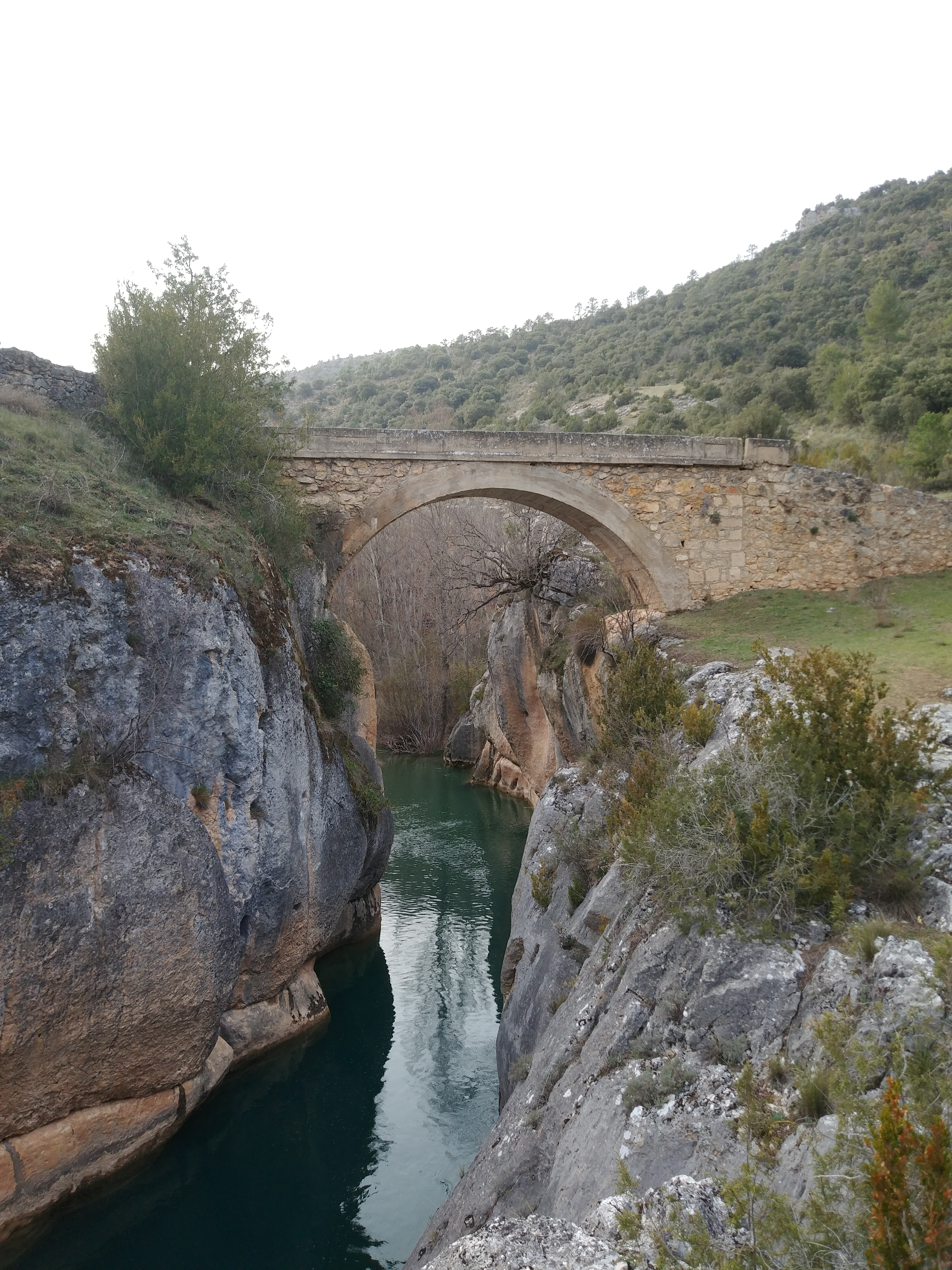

- Location within Province of Guadalajara Location within Spain
- Coordinates: 40°47′3″N 2°16′43″W
- Country: Spain
- Autonomous community: Castilla–La Mancha
- Province: Province of Guadalajara
- Municipality: Zaorejas
- Elevation: 881 m (2,890 ft)

Population (2023)
  - Total: 15

Huertapelayo is a hamlet located in the municipality of Zaorejas, in Guadalajara province, Castilla–La Mancha, Spain. As of 2023, it has a population of 15.

== Geography ==
Huertapelayo is located 130 km east-northeast of Guadalajara, Spain.
