= Villar de Cobeta =

- Village
- Location within Province of Guadalajara Location within Spain
- Coordinates: 40°49′26″N 2°10′56″W
- Country: Spain
- Autonomous community: Castilla–La Mancha
- Province: Province of Guadalajara
- Municipality: Zaorejas
- Elevation: 1,172 m (3,845 ft)

Population
  - Total: 15

Villar de Cobeta is a hamlet located in the municipality of Zaorejas, in Guadalajara province, Castilla–La Mancha, Spain. As of 2020, it has a population of 15.

== Geography ==
Villar de Cobeta is located 127 km east-northeast of Guadalajara, Spain.
