= Castle of Anguix =

- Castillo de Anguix (Spanish)
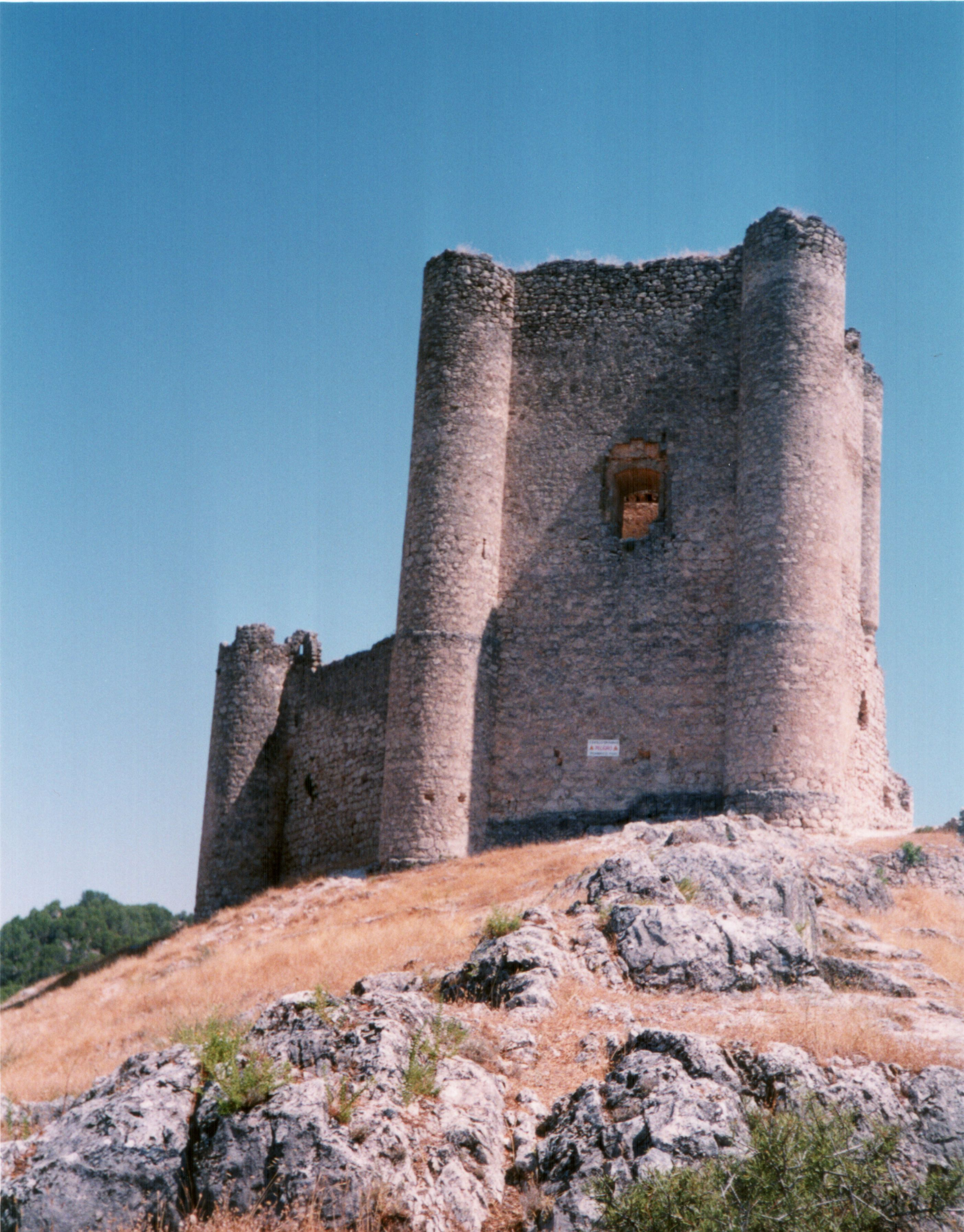

- Location within Spain
- 40.430278°N 2.79°W
- Location: Sayatón, Spain

Spanish Cultural Heritage
- Official name: Castillo de Anguix
- Type: Non-movable
- Criteria: Monument
- Designated: 1992
- Reference no.: RI-51-0007202

The Castle of Anguix (Spanish: Castillo de Anguix) is a castle located in Sayatón, Spain. It was declared Bien de Interés Cultural in 1992.

The Castle of Anguix is an example of castillo roquero architecture. These types of structures were common in areas with steep terrain that needed a fortified outpost. The castle was occupied during Austrian soldiers during the War of the Spanish Succession and was recaptured by Philip V's troops.
