= Sayatón =

Sayatón, Spain
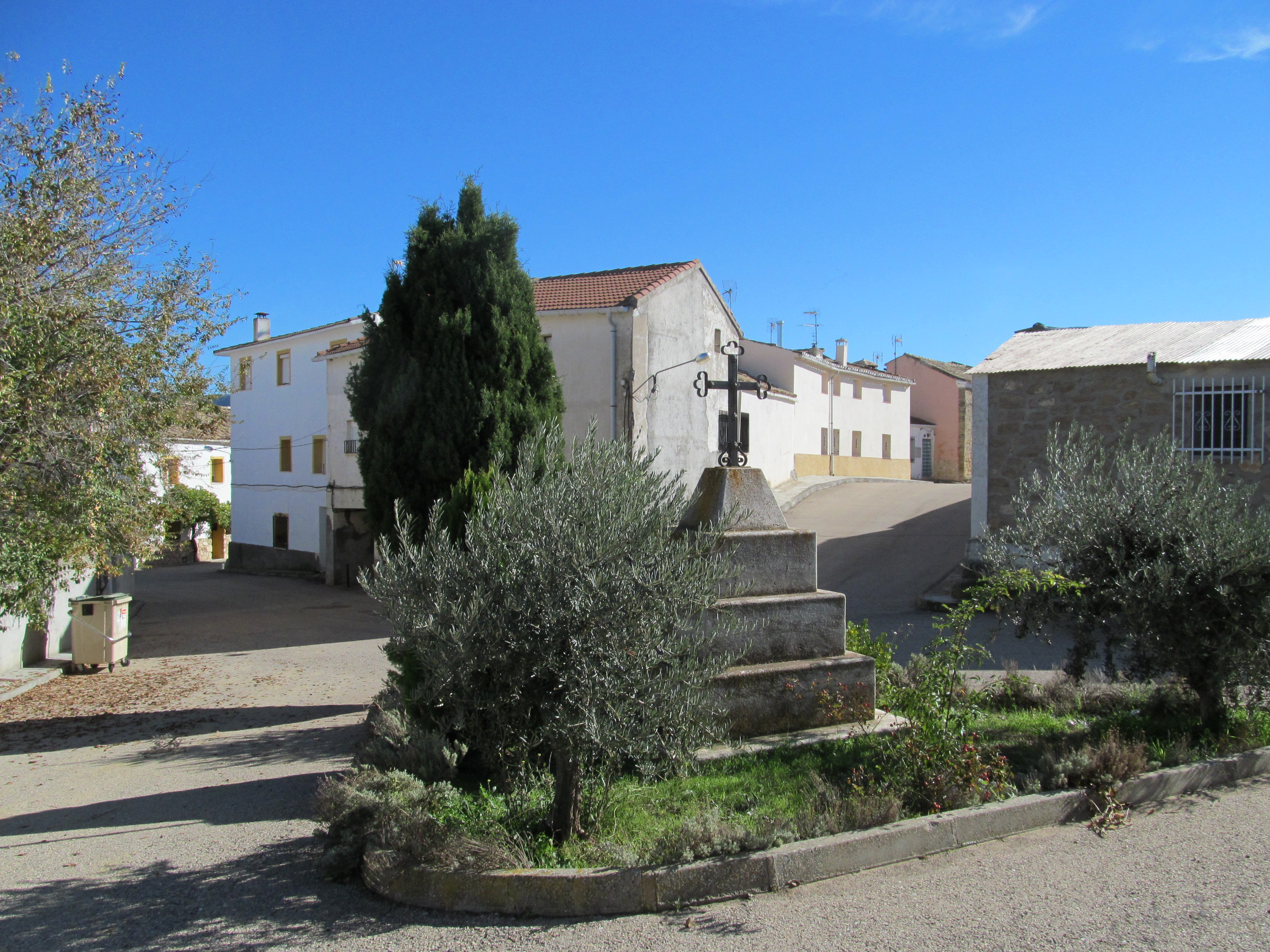

- Flag Coat of arms

- Location within Province of Guadalajara Location within Castilla-La Mancha Location within Spain
- Coordinates: 40°22′38″N 2°51′07″W
- Country: Spain
- Autonomous community: Castile-La Mancha
- Province: Guadalajara
- Municipality: Sayatón

Area
  - Total: 45 km^{2} (17 sq mi)

Population (2025-01-01)
  - Total: 64
  - Density: 1.4/km^{2} (3.7/sq mi)
- Time zone: UTC+1 (CET)
  - Summer (DST): UTC+2 (CEST)

Sayatón is a municipality located in the province of Guadalajara, Castile-La Mancha, Spain. According to the 2004 census (INE), the municipality has a population of 129 inhabitants.
