= Castle of Aixa =

Castle in Xaló municipality, Spain

Coordinates: 38.7614°N 0.0002°W

- Castell de la Solana
- Alcalalí in Spain
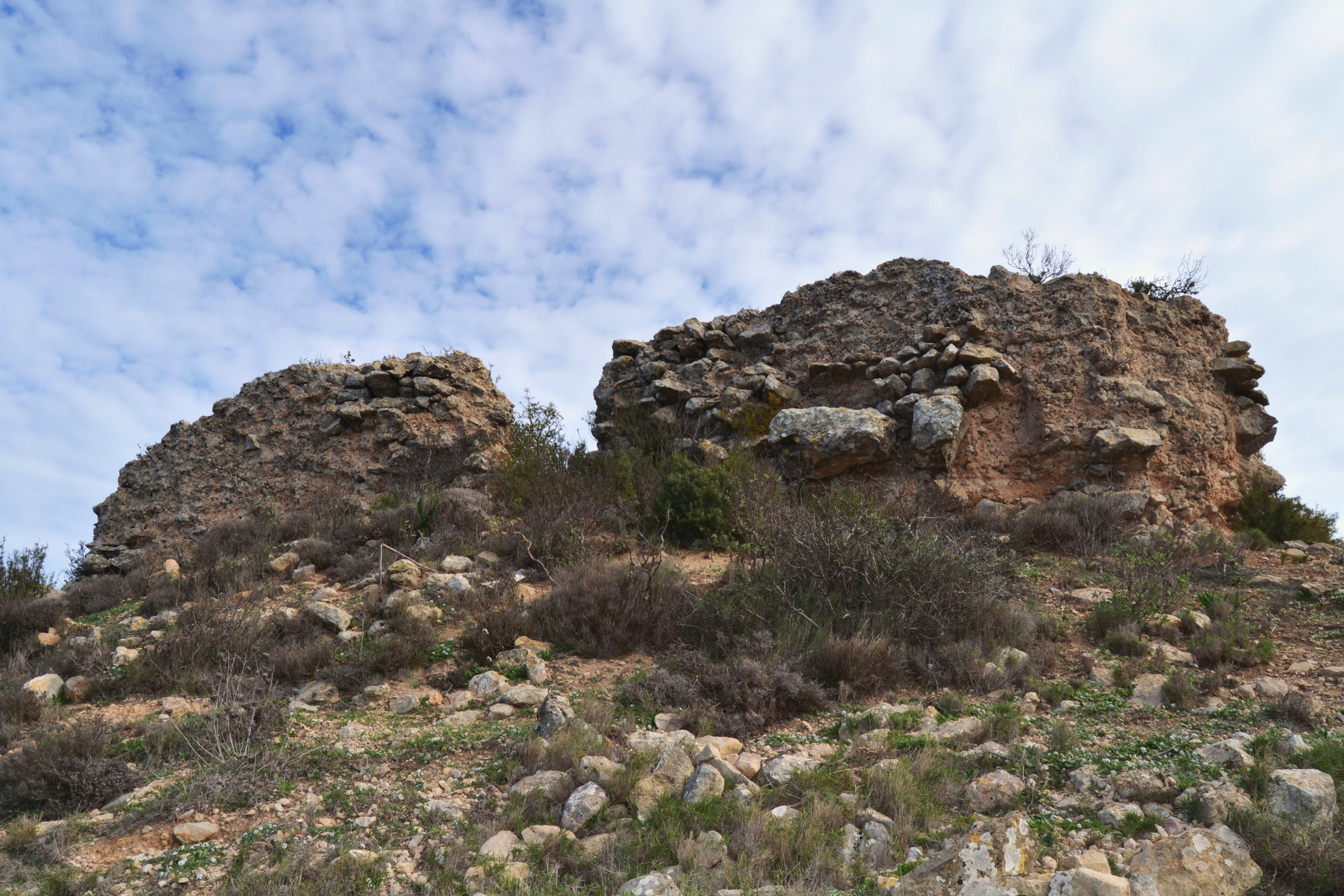
- Castell d'Aixa o de la Solana

Site information
- Type: Castle
- Website: Castell de la Solana

Location
- Location in Spain

Castle of Aixa, also known as Castell de la Solana (not to be confused with the current country house in Alcalalí named Castell de la Solana), consists of the remains of the ancient castle in the mountains of the Castellet de Aixa in the highest part of Beniquesi, a location in the municipal district of Alcalalí (Spain), 600 meters above sea level, between Llosa de Camacho and Jalón and covering the entire Pop Valley.

The castle is in ruins and only some remains of its base and walls can be seen. Its rectangular tower of 12 by 4 meters has three shallow pools and a fountain.
