= Atanzón =

Atanzón, Spain
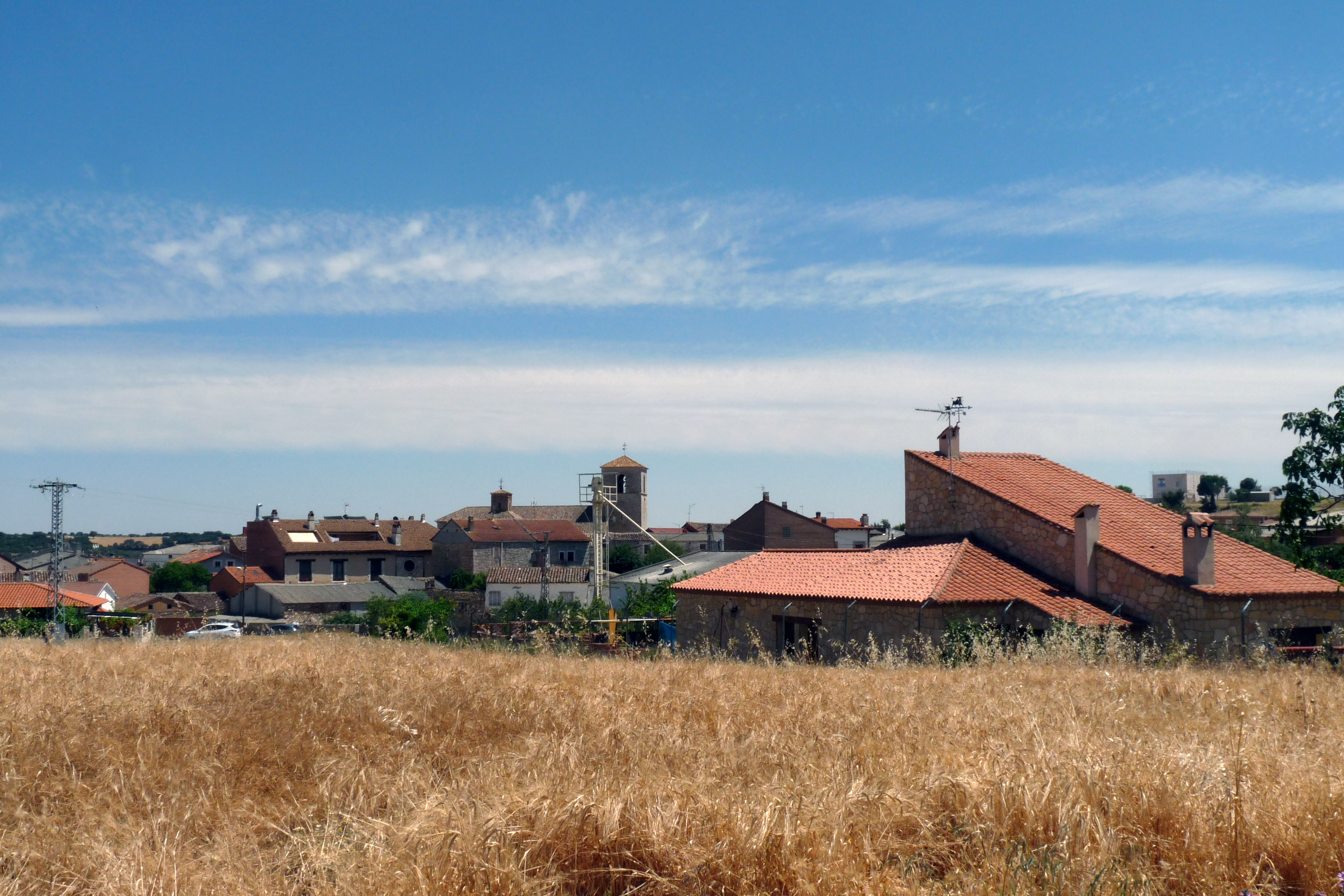

- Coat of arms

- Location within Province of Guadalajara Location within Castilla-La Mancha Location within Spain
- Coordinates: 40°40′03″N 2°59′48″W
- Country: Spain
- Autonomous community: Castile-La Mancha
- Province: Guadalajara
- Municipality: Atanzón

Area
  - Total: 28 km^{2} (11 sq mi)

Population (2025-01-01)
  - Total: 83
  - Density: 3.0/km^{2} (7.7/sq mi)
- Time zone: UTC+1 (CET)
  - Summer (DST): UTC+2 (CEST)

Atanzón is a municipality located in the province of Guadalajara, Castile-La Mancha, Spain. According to the 2004 census (INE), the municipality has a population of 105 inhabitants.
