= Tebra Castle =

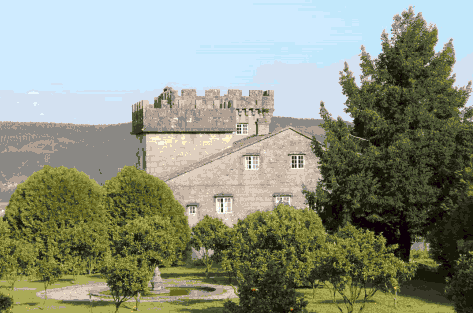
- View of the castle of Tebra
- Interactive map of the Tebra Castle area

General information
- Coordinates: 42°02′10″N 8°44′43″W

Website
- Turismo Rías baixas

Tebra Castle is a castle located in Pontevedra province, Galicia, Spain. The Tebra Castle is sited in the Tomiño valley. The river Tebra, tributary of the Miño, flows through this valley. Alonso Gómez Churruchao was the owner in 1345, but Pedro Álvarez de Soutomaior took possession of the Castle in 1468. Between 1481 and 1486, Don Fernando de Acuña, on behalf of the Catholic Monarchs, (Ferdinand II of Aragon and Isabella I of Castile), destroyed the castle and later it belonged to Alvaro Suarez de Deza. The Queen Joanna of Castile authorized the rebuilding of the castle and it was owned by the Count of Camiña one year later.

The battlements, the sentry box and the cornice are specially beautiful. But, undoubtedly, the Renaissance tower is the most outstanding element of the Castle. After the Catholic Monarchs ordered the destruction of this tower, Alvaro Suarez Deza rebuilt it in 1532. The two sides of the Tower have an extraordinary dimension of approximately 26 feet (8m) wide.

The Castle of Tebra has four floors: the ground floor and other three floors. The most remarkable parts of the Castle are its wide viewpoint, a gallery with semicircular arches, a large tower and a chapel.

The Castle is in good condition and it is in the municipality of O Seixo, Tomiño. Nowadays the castle is a residence of private property but visitors can have free access to the outdoor part of the castle.
